= LGBTQ art in Singapore =

LGBT art in Singapore, or queer art in Singapore, broadly refers to modern and contemporary visual art practices that draw on lesbian, gay, bisexual, and transgender+ imagery and themes, addressing topics such as LGBT rights, history and culture in Singapore. Such queer art practices are often by Singaporean or Singapore-based visual artists and curators who identify as LGBT+ or queer.

Queer visual art is a notable countercultural facet of contemporary Singaporean society, which formerly criminalised, albeit unenforced, consensual, private sexual acts between men (legal for women) through the presence of laws such as Section 377A of the Penal Code.

As homosexuality has been considered a taboo subject, practitioners in Singapore have historically contended with a host of limitations, with the avoidance of positive queer representation in local mainstream media, to operating with the risk of being blacklisted by the state, or vilification due to homophobia and transphobia from conservative aspects of wider Singaporean society.

In August 2005, after organisers of the annual Nation party had their application to hold the event in Singapore abruptly rejected by the police, gay activists organised Singapore's first month-long gay pride celebration called IndigNation.

Ever since the early 2010s, LGBT+ topics have been gradually liberalised, with regular discussions about such topics in the public sphere and local mainstream media. This was also in tandem with the rise of Pink Dot SG, which has now also influenced such events in many countries around the world.

In Singapore's contemporary art history, openly out queer artists whose art practices engage with notions of queerness have been documented since the 1980s. Queer art practices from Singapore have also been exhibited internationally, more often beyond the specific curatorial framework of a queer art exhibition. These art practices are loosely connected, and not determined by a specific medium, spanning wide-ranging forms such as performance art, installation art, video art, drawing, painting, sculpture, photography, film, and mixed media, for instance.

== Regulations ==
Practitioners of LGBT+ visual arts have to contend with various restrictions imposed by Singaporean law. Alongside Section 377A of the Penal Code, which de jure but not de facto criminalises consensual, private sexual acts between men, strict censorship laws remain in place regarding LGBT+ representation in Singapore, among other sensitive topics. It is noted that Section 377A of the Penal Code has since been repealed in 2022.

At the end of May 2005, in an amendment to the Public Entertainment and Meetings Act (Chapter 257), nine categories of arts entertainment events including "displays or exhibitions of art objects or paintings" were exempted from having to apply for a Public Entertainment Licence from the Media Development Authority (MDA). The decision was made after consultation with MDA's arts advisory groups, following the recommendations of the 2003 Censorship Review Committee appointed by the Government arts watchdog of the time, the Ministry of Information, Communications and the Arts (MITA) to exempt more arts entertainment from licensing. The 2005 exhibition at The Substation, Bao Bei, by Singaporean artist Jason Wee, which featured pixelated male genitalia, was mentioned in the press release and deemed to be "innocuous" by the state.

== History ==
=== Prior to 1993 ===
From the 1980s to 1990s, artists such as Jimmy Ong, Teng Nee Cheong, and Ho Soon Yeen were notable for being some of the few openly queer artists of the time, or whose practices engaged with notions of queerness in Singapore. Ong's work from the 1980s, for instance, would feature black-and-white charcoal drawings that depicted nude, queer male bodies in various contexts and relationships. Around the same period in the 1980s, Teng would be known for figurative works across watercolour, pastel, charcoal and oil, with sensual and homoerotic depictions of male nudes.

In 1992, as part of The Substation's New Criteria exhibition series, Ho would exhibit alongside artist Dominique Hui for We Kissed, a show that would explore notions of sexuality through drawings, collages, and three-dimensional works. One of her paintings on display was a self-portrait, titled Monkey & Thinker, now in the collection of NUS Museum and shown at their 2017 exhibition, Radio Malaya: Abridged Conversations About Art.

=== 1993: Art as protests ===
From 20 to 28 February 1993, Singapore artist Tan Peng and American artist John C. Goss held an exhibition entitled Flowing Forest, Burning Hearts at The Substation gallery, and Tan notably came out publicly in mainstream press as a gay man. Tan's large pastel drawings tackled topics such as HIV caregiving and police entrapment.

From 26 December 1993 to 1 January 1994, the Artists' General Assembly (AGA) was held at the 5th Passage art space, an arts festival co-organised with The Artists Village. During the 12-hour AGA New Year's Eve show from 31 December 1993 to 1 January 1994, Josef Ng staged a performance work, Brother Cane, in protest at the arrest of 12 homosexual men during anti-gay operations in 1993, whose personal details were published in local mainstream newspapers.

During the final minutes of the performance, Ng turned his back to the audience and trimmed his pubic hair, a moment photographed by The New Paper. Media coverage of the performance portrayed this as an obscene act. Following the public outcry, 5th Passage was charged with breaching the conditions of its Public Entertainment License, blacklisted from funding by Singapore's National Arts Council, and evicted from its Parkway Parade site. Iris Tan, as the gallery manager of the 5th Passage art space, was prosecuted by the Singapore High Court alongside Ng. Described as one of the "darkest moments of Singapore's contemporary art scene", the incident led to a ten-year no-funding rule for performance art, a ruling lifted only in 2003.

=== 2004–2010: Resurgence of exhibitions ===
In August 2004, three LGBT+ art exhibitions, Red + White = Pink, Erotica, and Private Edge, were held at local galleries as part of the cultural activities surrounding Nation.04, an early LGBT+ pride event in Singapore, featuring the work of queer artists both locally and regionally. Red + White = Pink was held at Utterly Art, The other 2 exhibitions are Erotica at Art Seasons and Private Edge at B2G Gallery (solo exhibition by Norm Yip).

In May 2005, New York-based Singaporean artist Jason Wee held an exhibition at The Substation gallery titled Bao Bei, which examined the ways through which identity was constructed in gay online personal ads, also using online self-portraits to recreate a scene from the late Singaporean playwright Kuo Pao Kun's Descendants of the Eunuch Admiral. In July, an exhibition by openly gay artist Martin Loh opened at the Utterly Art exhibition space in South Bridge Road entitled Cerita Budak-Budak, meaning "Children's Stories" in Peranakan Malay. From 10 to 16 August, the second art exhibition of IndigNation was held at The Box, entitled Solitary Desire and featured pieces by Ong Jenn Long and Steve Chua, both of whom were young artists.

At the 53rd Venice Biennale in 2009, Ming Wong represented Singapore at the national pavilion with Life of Imitation. The exhibition explored cinema history and featured video installations in which Wong cross-dressed to play various characters from world cinema. This performance was viewed by Wong as a form of drag. Wong was awarded a Special Mention during the Biennale's Opening Ceremony, the first for a Singaporean artist at the Venice Biennale.

=== 2011–2016: Censorship ===
At the 3rd Singapore Biennale in 2011, Japanese-British artist Simon Fujiwara's work, Welcome to the Hotel Munber (2010), was censored by the Singapore Art Museum, despite appropriate advisory notices put up by the museum itself as the organiser of the Biennale. The homoerotic content of the work was considered to contravene the law on pornography by the museum, and contextually relevant gay pornographic magazines were removed from the installation without prior consultation with either the artist, biennale director Matthew Ngui or curators Russell Storer and Trevor Smith. While the curatorial team and artist were informed later, extended discussions and negotiations took so long that the temporary closure of the work, called for by the artist, became permanent as the Biennale came to an end.

In February 2012, as part of the M1 Singapore Fringe Festival, Loo Zihan staged a one-night only performance of Cane, which controversially re-enacted the significant 1994 performance art piece, Brother Cane, by Josef Ng. In December 2012, Loo organised his first solo exhibition Archiving Cane at The Substation, which consisted of an installation of 12 artefacts from Cane and Loo's artistic practice, along with a durational performance.

Loo Zihan would open the M1 Singapore Fringe Festival 2015 with With/Out, a performance installation based on The Necessary Stage's Completely With/Out Character (1999), a monologue by the late Paddy Chew, the first person in Singapore to come out as being HIV-positive. In the same year, Loo was awarded the Young Artist Award by the National Arts Council of Singapore, and selected to exhibit for the President's Young Talents competition at the Singapore Art Museum.

In 2016, the queer-themed exhibition, Fault-Lines: Disparate And Desperate Intimacies, was held at the Institute of Contemporary Arts Singapore, guest curated by Singapore-based curator and writer Wong Binghao. For the exhibition, Loo Zihan presented Queer Objects: An Archive for the Future, an installation consisting of 81 objects such as perfume bottles and torch lights used at Pink Dot, the annual LGBT+ rights event in Singapore; all of which presented without context to "permit viewers to construct their own narratives for the objects based on their individual experiences". Two objects, both of which were sex toys, were later removed as the institute was concerned that they contravened Section 292 1(a) of the Penal Code, which prohibits the display of obscene materials. Other Singaporean artists in the exhibition included transgender artist Marla Bendini, known for her work exploring transgender issues.

=== 2017–present ===
In December 2017, Singaporean filmmaker Tan Wei Keong won Best Singapore Short Film at the Singapore International Film Festival with Between Us Two, a documentary about a gay son's conversation with his mother. The jury felt that the depiction of gay marriage and topics addressed by the film were important and that the personal approach by Tan made it "even more poignant".

As part of Toy Factory Productions Ltd's director-mentorship programme, "DIRECT ENTRY" returns for the second season in 2022. Theatre director Adeeb Fazah was presented a well timed original script titled "For My Highness – Sex, Drugs & A Mother's Prayer" which spotlights on the detriments of substance abuse, societal rejections and the imminent strains it places onto familial ties portraying the reality of those who identify themselves with the LGBT community in Singapore. The show ran from 25 to 27 November 2022 at the Black Box, Stamford Arts Centre with a duration of one hour and twenty minutes with no intermission.

For My Highness follows its Malay protagonist Zaki (played by Zulfiqar Izzudin), whose struggle with drug addiction brings him and the audience on a sexy psychedelic trip that examines the dangers of drug abuse. Apart from illuminating the prevalent issue of chemsex within the gay community, For My Highness hopes to foster greater empathy for those who are directly or indirectly affected by substance abuse." The play was written by Shaleihin Pi'ee, who is deeply inspired by the collective stories from a Malay/Muslim perspective and a gay man's journey to navigate life as an LGBT in Singapore.

In partnership with the supporting healthcare partners WE CARE Community Services, The Greenhouse, Playwright, Director and Cast Team a thirty-minutes post-show dialogue for both the 3pm and 8pm show on 26 November 2022 was held.

On 29 September 2023, Nanyang Technological University Centre for Contemporary Art (NTU CCA) commissioned a series of arts performances to celebrate its 10th anniversary. One of the shows, Queer-tai, was a segment by Intervention, "a queer party collective". The segment featured a half-hour karaoke led by a few people, including some dressed in drag, followed by a DJ setlist and also a drag queen, playing the tune of National Day theme song "Home", by Kit Chan, on a trombone. National Arts Council (NAC) chief executive officer Low Eng Teong, who was present as a guest of honour, was interviewed by Today, local mainstream media, on the significance of having arts performances with LGBTQ themes in public spaces and educational institutions, he responded that regardless of where such performances are held, "artists explore all types of topics and themes and issues in their work, so I think that is something that is to be expected, in (that) artists will always want to make work that speaks to our times. NAC responded later that Today had misreported Low's comments and they were taken out of context and had published a misleading article. Today published a transcript of the interview defending its article. NTU also published a statement that the performance by Queer-tai should not have been held in public and that the sensitivities associated with it should not been staged as a public event. NTU also said it would reviewed its internal processes. NAC repeated its stand and that its do not object to arts performances with LGBTQ themes "per se" and that it has a "clear and consistent position on how such performances can be staged". After several back-to-back statements were released from Today and the NAC,Today in an editor's note accepted NAC's clarification and apologised for the published article. It had also changed the original article title.
