= LGBTQ culture in Singapore =

There are no statistics on how many LGBTQ people there are in Singapore or what percentage of the population they constitute. While homosexuality is legal in the country, the country is largely conservative.

== Arts and culture ==
=== Media ===
Portrayal of LGBTQ culture shown in media is subjected to media censorship in Singapore with age-restricted ratings.

The Infocomm Media Development Authority's policies on content on free-to-air television that it should not promote or justify the homosexual lifestyle.

The 2020 Mediacorp's Chinese TV series, My Guardian Angels, was criticised by the LGBT community in Singapore for perpetuating the stereotype that gay men are paedophiles and have sexually transmitted diseases. The sub-plot was also condemned by Action For Aids, a Singaporean non-governmental organisation "dedicated to fighting HIV/AIDS infection", who stated that "The portrayal of gay men as paedophiles further perpetuates falsehoods that create further suffering among an already marginalised and stigmatised population." A second sub-plot involving parents, portrayed by Kym Ng and Brandon Wong, worrying about the sexual orientation of their son, portrayed by Benjamin Tan, and behaving in a homophobic manner, was also criticised.

In response to the criticism, Mediacorp issued an apology, stating that it had "no intention to disrespect or discriminate against the LGBTQ community in the drama". A spokesperson for the company stated that the first sub-plot was meant to "encourage young people to be aware of potential dangers and not be afraid to speak up and protect themselves", and that the second sub-plot was meant to " depict the real life struggles some parents face in communicating with their children on topics such as relationships and sexual orientation".

== Internet ==
Singapore has particularly established LGBTQ portals owing to its high Internet penetration rates and the restriction on LGBT content in print and broadcast media.

- Blowing Wind Gay Forum is an online discussion forum for gay men in Singapore started in 1997 to discuss any issues which concern them. It eschews political, religious, and anti-racial topics.
- Dear Straight People is a media platform focused on content related to and concerning the LGBTQ+ community. Founded by Sean Foo in July 2015, Dear Straight People has become Singapore's leading LGBTQ+ publication.
- Fridae.asia is an English-language LGBT news and social networking portal founded in 2000 by Stuart Koe. Fridae was popular during the early 2000s, but has become largely inactive during the 2010s.
- Gay SG Confessions, also known as 'GSC' – Started in February 2013 in the footsteps of a host of popular "confessions" websites, GSC is a Facebook page that hosts a collection of user-contributed stories by gay, bisexual, lesbian, straight, transgender and curious members. The page was a sleeper published over 500 'confessions' or posts within less than 2 weeks of its creation and garnering over 10,000-page 'Likes' in slightly over 6 months. The site is run by an anonymous moderator, an account director in an advertising firm in his 30s who wants to be known only as "GC". Gay SG Confessions rebranded itself to GLBT Voices, and in 2017 announced its closure. After a 3-year hiatus, GLBT Voices announced its comeback, but its reach and influence has waned since its heyday in 2013. GLBT Voices is now largely inactive on social media.
- Trevvy, formerly known as SgBoy – was set up in March 1999, originally known as "Singapore Boy Homepage" before being renamed SgBoy. It is one of the most popular LGBT portals in Singapore. It underwent a makeover, rebranding itself as Trevvy.com in August 2006, shifting its focus to the more mature 25 to 40-year age group of the local gay market and expanding its user base regionally. On 30 April 2021, Trevvy.com announced the closure of its website, due to its dwindling popularity.

== Organisations supporting LGBT rights ==
- The Free Community Church
- Pelangi Pride Centre (PPC), Singapore's first physical LGBT Centre, operating since 2003
- OogaChaga, LGBT+ counselling service, operating since 1999

== Notable residents ==
=== Historical ===
- Paddy Chew was the first Singaporean to publicly declare his HIV-positive status. He came out on 12 December 1998 during the First National AIDS Conference in Singapore. He identified his orientation as bisexual. His affliction was dramatised in a play called Completely With/Out Character produced by The Necessary Stage, directed by Alvin Tan and written by Haresh Sharma, staged in May 1999. He died on 21 August 1999, shortly after the play's run ended.
- Arthur Yap was a poet who was awarded the 1983 Singapore Cultural Medallion for Literature. He died of laryngeal carcinoma on 19 June 2006, bequeathing $500,000/-, part of his estate which included his apartment off Killiney Road, to the National Cancer Centre Singapore where he was a patient.

=== Arts personalities ===
- Cyril Wong, poet.
- Alfian Sa'at, writer, poet and playwright. He had a weekly column on gay website Trevvy titled, "Iced Bandung".
- Ng Yi-Sheng, writer and performance artist. Ng is the author of a collection of personally written poems, including ones with queer-theming.
- Sean Foo, entrepreneur, filmmaker and LGBT advocate who founded Dear Straight People. Sean is also credited as the creator of Singapore's first gay web drama series, "Getaway."

=== Entertainers ===
- Kumar, comedian and television host, actor, and drag queen. Kumar was the first entertainer in Singapore to come out.

=== Politicians ===
- Vincent Wijeysingha; first Singaporean politician to openly declare that he was gay when he made a post on Facebook ahead of the annual Pink Dot SG event.

== See also ==
- LGBT history in Singapore
- LGBT rights in Singapore
- Human male sexuality
- Pink Dot SG
- Section 377A, a British colonial-era law outlawing same-sex activity between men that was repealed in 2022
