= LGBTQ topics in Singapore =

LGBTQ topics in Singapore include:

- LGBTQ culture in Singapore
  - LGBTQ art in Singapore
- LGBTQ history in Singapore
- LGBTQ literature in Singapore
- LGBTQ rights in Singapore
  - Recognition of same-sex unions in Singapore
  - Section 377A (Singapore)
- LGBTQ pride events in Singapore
- List of LGBTQ organisations in Singapore
- Transgender people in Singapore
