= LGBTQ history in Singapore =

LGBTQ rights in Singapore
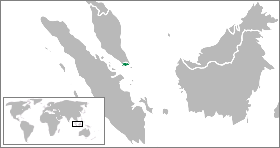
- Singapore
- Legal status: Legal
- Gender identity: Sex reassignment surgery legal
- Discrimination protections: Limited

Family rights
- Recognition of relationships: No recognition of same-sex unions
- Adoption: Limited

There is a long history of lesbian, gay, bisexual, and transgender activity in Singapore. Male homosexuality was outlawed under British rule (1819–1942; 1946–1959), despite being acknowledged among the local population. Following Japanese occupation during World War II and the country gaining independence, homosexuality and transvestism were visible as a street scene, and from the 1970s were catered for in some nightclubs. In that decade also, Singapore became a centre of gender-reassignment surgery.

Concerns over HIV arose after cases were reported in the 1980s. During the 1990s, police clamped down on manifestations of homosexuality due to the stigma of HIV, leading to the growth of a gay movement.

== Pre-colonial period (up to 1819) ==
Relatively little is known about pre-colonial Singapore, let alone the history of homosexuality during this period. It is assumed that ideas and practices relating to sexual minorities were similar to other contemporary and nearby Malay societies.

As with all pre-modern societies, traditional Malay culture did not contain the idea or the figure of the modern gay individual. However, Malay society did acknowledge the reality and existence of alternatives to heterosexual practices. ‘Third gender’ or transgender individuals, who are called mak nyah, were socially recognised, tolerated and even incorporated into community life. They occupied a stable, albeit arguably marginalised position within society. The mak nyah are similar in many ways to the hijra in India or the fa'afafine or Mahu in Polynesia. Unfortunately, there is limited scholarly knowledge about homosexuality in traditional Malay culture.

== Colonial period (1819–1948) ==
=== Traditional Asian attitudes to homosexuality ===
Institutionalised gay marriage practices may have occurred amongst Hokkien men in Ming dynasty China. The subculture was exported along with the human tide into Singapore and practised discreetly in an alien environment which officially espoused Victorian values. Usually, the younger of two male homosexual lovers would be "adopted" as the godson of the parents of the elder lover in a ceremony before the ancestral altar, involving an offering, amongst others, of pigs' trotters. Similarly, amongst the Indians, 'maasti' or sexual play between men who were not necessarily gay would likely have been widespread with the paucity of women.

=== British law & homosexuality ===
As with other British colonies, Singapore acquired a legal system and law modelled after Britain. Victorian values were codified into strict laws governing sexual behaviour in the United Kingdom, and these were brought to the colonies. The colonial legal system criminalised sodomy (see section 377 of the Singapore Penal Code). These laws reinforced the values of the ruling British elite, which set the tone for other classes and ethnicities to emulate, at least on the surface. Over time, and to appear equally 'civilised' many Asians disavowed their longstanding cultural tolerance of sexual minorities.

Between 1938 and 1941, seven high-profile cases of prosecution under or related to Section 377A happened. Although four cases involved Europeans, only one was convicted.

In September 1938, Lim Eng Kooi and Lim Eng Kok became the first to receive punishment in the Straits Settlement. The two "well-known" Penang Chinese were sentenced to seven months imprisonment each under Section 377A.

In March 1941, a Tan Ah Yiow was sentenced to nine months imprisonment after he was found with a "European client" in a "low down quarter", where he was discovered by F. J. C. Wilson, head of the local Anti-Vice Branch, following a tip. Wilson added that in court that a "disgusting and revolting practice had been performed", with medical evidence forthcoming.

In April 1941, Lee Hock Chee was prosecuted under Section 377A after a lascar saw him molesting a sleeping Chinese boy at a five-foot passageway off Rochore Road.

In April 1941, Captain Douglas Marr, the Deputy Assistant Provost Marshal of the Singapore Fortress Command, was accused of having committed "an act of gross indecency" with a male Malay youth, Sudin bin Daud, who denied being a "catamite". Sudin claimed that on 13 March or 14, he was walking along Stamford Road, a supposed "area for male prostitutes", at night when a car driven by Marr stopped, picked him up and brought him to his boarding house in Tanglin Hill. The offence against Section 377A allegedly took place there, he claimed, whereupon Marr gave Sudin some money and let Sudin take a watch before Sudin left, leaving his shirt there. In his defence, Marr claimed that he had wanted to get "at the root of the homosexual type of vice and I thought, as it transpires very foolishly, that it would be a good idea to question a catamite and to try and find out to what extent soldiers in different regiments were involved". Marr did not deny picking up Sudin, who he claimed approached him, but maintained that he merely questioned him back home to no avail, as he had mistaken Sudin for an Indian and spoken to him in Hindustani. On 16 April and 29 July, after a withdrawn appeal by the prosecution, Marr was acquitted of the charge, despite the fact that Sudin's shirt was found in his room. Sudin, who had pleaded guilty to the act of gross indecency and theft of the watch, was sentenced to eighteen months imprisonment on 27 March.

In May 1941, Gunner Ernest Allen of the Royal Artillery became the only European convicted under Section 377A after witness Chan Yau testified that in March, he and Allen had committed the alleged offence in an Anguilla Road house. Allen denied the allegations, claiming that he had hired Chan to get him a girl. Allen was sentenced to 15 months imprisonment.

In July 1941, a blackmail case prosecuted by Mr. Griffith-Jones for the Crown; a Mr. 'X', as he was christened by the newspapers, admitted "he had been addicted to homosexual practices" had been extorted by more than two Chinese locals, Tan Ah Lek and Lim John Chye. They extorted and attempted to extort money from him by threatening to expose him. After several years Mr. 'X' complained to the police, who investigated and brought several cases to court. The European, who "held a responsible position in a Singapore firm", first came into contact with Lim in January 1939, when Lim wrote a letter to him asking for $5 to keep silent. By 1940, Mr. 'X' had paid him over $1,000, while the English-speaking Tan had extorted and tried to extort a total of thousands of dollars from Mr. 'X', and at the end of 1938, even extracting monthly payments from him. On 30 July, he was sentenced to five years imprisonment.

== World War II to 1960s ==
When the Japanese invaded Singapore in February 1942, Japanese laws replaced previous colonial laws. Gay sex was never criminalised in Japan and would now have been technically legal in Singapore. However, given the lack of human rights and rule of law under the Japanese occupation, this change in law was a technical and historical quirk, reflective of a different legal tradition, rather than an expansion of real rights for gay people.

Anecdotally, gay cruising continued in post-war Singapore in back alleys, public parks and toilets. In the most part, this was ignored by the police and no one was charged under section 377 of the Singapore Penal Code. Meanwhile, cross-dressing and transgender prostitution on Bugis Street became increasingly prominent. The State and mainstream society initially accepted it is as a vaguely undesirable but inevitable vice, similar to the pragmatic and worldly attitudes towards prostitution in the cosmopolitan port-city. With their growing fame, the transvestites of Bugis Street became a tourist attraction, drawing local and foreign visitors every night. Bugis Street and its associated transgender community were by far the most visible face of sexual minorities in the immediate post-war period, much as transgender people had been in traditional Malay society. The difference was that the community was now much more public, urban and multi-ethnic.

Another arena in which LGBTQ issues were being played out was in national service. Compulsory uniformed (usually military) service was implemented in 1967: all 18-year-old males were required to train full-time for two or two-and-a-half years, according to their level of education. Homosexuality and transsexuality were listed as conditions in a Singapore Armed Forces (SAF) 'Directory of Diseases' (disease code 302). Prior to enlistment, all enlistees underwent a medical examination, during which they were asked to declare their homosexuality and/or transgender status (medics conducting the examination had little awareness of the difference between the two). New recruits who came out were deployed to non-combat, non-sensitive vocations. They were generally downgraded to a Public Employment Status of 3 (PES3) and assigned only light clerical work.

While the SAF was concerned of the safety of out gay and trans men living and working with straight servicemen it was also reluctant to exempt them from the compulsory National Service that all Singaporean men had to perform. However, post-operative trans women were exempted from National Service as the Singapore Government recognised their new gender identity as women. It is unknown if post-operative trans men perform National Service, though it is unlikely that many of them exist who have undergone their operation by the time of enlistment, around the age of 18.

== 1970s ==
With growing prosperity, many homosexuals, especially the English-educated middle class were exposed, via travel and the mass media, to the social liberalism of the West and the nascent gay movements there. This exposure introduced the idea that local society could evolve similarly. The growing popularity of travel to Thailand and Japan in the late 1970s also introduced Singaporeans to traditional Asian societies that were more accepting of homosexuals.

Meanwhile, several nightlife entrepreneurs realised the unmet social demands of the emerging gay market, and gradually allowed their establishments to cater to gay customers on certain nights. One of the earliest was The Hangar, located in a secluded area outside the city centre where, for the first time, a large group of gay men could freely congregate and even dance together. Encouraged by this precedent, homosexuals started to patronise other, mainly straight, discos in the city area such as My Place, Black Velvet, West End, El Morocco, The Library, Studio M and even the NCO Club at Beach Road. Nightclubs like Pebbles Bar, Tropicana Inn, and less popularly Treetops Bar at the Holiday Inn, were increasingly packing in the gays and became iconic institutions of the local gay scene. Some heterosexual clubbers complained about this, so the managements of some of these outlets were pressurised by the authorities to display signs proclaiming 'No man and man dancing' (sic). Over time, the ruling was relaxed for fast songs, but same-gender slow dancing continued to be proscribed.

In November 1971, the English-language evening tabloid New Nation ran an exclusive interview with a trans woman on her transition. In July 1972, an exposé of the hidden lives of Singapore homosexuals in New Nation, headlined 'They are different', carried photographs of a gay couple embracing and "local transvestites". It caused a stir and raised mainstream awareness of the existence of gay people who were not transgender. The report also highlighted how "homosexuality is as old as ancient Greece".

During the decade, there was a well-known trans model featured occasionally in Her World magazine. On the silver screen, cinema goers enjoyed a Chinese language Shaw Brothers production entitled Ai nu (Love Slave) which starred actresses Lily Ho and Betty Pei Ti as a lesbian couple in a period setting. In the final scene when Lily Ho wanted to desert Betty Pei Ti to pair off with the male hero, she was asked for a final kiss. Whilst they were kissing, Betty Pei Ti sneaked a poison pill into her mouth which she bit, thus transforming it into a poignant kiss of death.

The widespread construction of public swimming pools from the 1970s gave Singapore the highest density of public pools per unit area in the world. Coupled with the emergence of many shopping centres, this increased the number of conducive spaces for gay cruising. The growing population, size and urban density of the city created opportunities for anonymous gay encounters even as it raised the risk of discovery by others and hence the number of public complaints about gay cruising and/or public sex, a factor which led to the phenomenon of police entrapment more than a decade later.

As Singaporean surgeons became more skilful, some like Prof. S Shan Ratnam were authorised to perform gender reassignment surgery of trans women at Kandang Kerbau Hospital from 1971 onwards. However, before hopeful trans women could go under the knife, they first had to subject themselves to a battery of psychological tests by psychiatrist Prof. Tsoi Wing Foo. Later, the more technically demanding surgeries for trans men was also offered there and at Alexandra Hospital, performed by gynaecologists such as Dr. Ilancheran. A Gender Identity Clinic and Gender Reassignment Surgery Clinic were set up at the National University Hospital two decades later. In fact, for thirty years, Singapore was one of the world leaders in gender reassignment surgery. Bugis Street and Johore Road started to become populated with a range of genders from cross-dressers to iatrogenic intersex individuals to post-operative trans women. Local hospitals and clinics also attracted transgender clients from other countries in the region, especially Malaysia and Thailand.

== 1980s ==
The early 1980s was a period of widespread prosperity and new freedoms which saw the opening of clubs like Shadows, Marmota, Legend and Niche which catered to a predominantly gay clientele even though they were not exclusively gay. These discos would be closed by the time of the mid-1980s, for unclear reasons, to be replaced by weekly Sunday Night Gay Parties or "Shadow Nights" run by the former management of Shadows (affectionately known as the "Shadow Management"). These "Shadow Nights" were roving events held at semi-permanent venues which included Rascals (at the Pan Pacific Hotel), Heartthrob (at Melia at Scotts), The Gate (at Orchard Hotel), Music World (in Katong) and Studebaker's which later morphed into Venom (at Pacific Plaza). It is interesting to note that men's night parties held since Studebaker's were no longer run by the "Shadow Management". Lesbian culture also found a focal point in a small bar named Crocodile Rock in Far East Plaza, which remains to this day the oldest lesbian bar in Singapore.

It came as a shock when the first case of local HIV infection was reported in 1985. It galvanised a group of healthcare personnel (both gay and straight) to set up a non-governmental organisation (NGO) called Action For AIDS (AFA) in 1988 which provided support and counselling for AIDS victims as well as educating the public on safe sex. AFA was not technically part of the Singapore gay movement and has been careful to present itself as an NGO dealing with a public health issue. However, a significant portion of the energy and leadership behind it has been provided by gay people and in many practical ways AFA has rallied homosexuals around a cause.

Cruising continued in areas like Hong Lim Park, Boat Quay, back alleys in the Central Business District, Raffles Place MRT Station and Tanjong Pagar, swimming pools, Fort Road Beach and public toilets. Police patrols to these areas were sporadically seen; on rare occasions individuals have had their IC numbers recorded, but for the most part they were left alone and no arrests were made. Lesbian couples who held hands in public, while not officially persecuted, report that they were frequently the target of verbal, physical, and at times sexual abuse from passers-by and gang members.

From the mid-1980s onwards, pubs and karaoke bars like Babylon and Inner Circle started to sprout up along Tanjong Pagar. Sizable groups of gay men could be seen milling about outside these establishments especially on weekends. This, along with cruising activity at nearby Ann Siang Hill and the surrounding back alleys would eventually come to give Tanjong Pagar Road the reputation of being Singapore's gay quarter.

Large bookshops like Borders, Kinokuniya, Tower Books and even MPH responded to the growing body of mainly foreign gay-themed literature by stocking these books along with those on women's issues in sections entitled 'Gender Studies'.

== 1990s ==
The expansion of gay spaces in the 1980s were curbed to some degree in the 1990s. Singapore's rapid economic growth had been attributed by its leaders to 'Asian values'. The promotion of these ideas by Singaporean leaders fostered a climate of social conservatism. Against this backdrop, gays were perceived as a threat to Asian values and a sign of the emergence of decadent Western liberalism and individualism. Complaints made by the public about public cruising led to police entrapment raids. Youthful and attractive undercover cops would pose as gay cruisers. The moment they were fondled by their targets, the latter would be arrested for outrage of modesty. Their names and occasionally mugshots were published in the press to humiliate them.

The most publicised case occurred in a forested grove near Tanjong Rhu's Fort Road Beach in November 1993. Amongst the 12 men arrested was a Singapore Broadcasting Corporation producer. All were punished with three strokes of the cane and prison sentences ranging from 2 to 6 months. In protest, performance artist Josef Ng staged a work on New Year's Eve, 1993, as part of which he snipped off his pubic hair while his back was turned to the audience. This provoked a severe government reprisal in the form of a ban on all performance art, one that held sway until 2004. Ng was also charged in court for committing an obscene act in public.

Gay discos also experienced occasional police raids, the most well-known of which occurred at Rascals on 30 May 1993, where policemen shouted rudely at patrons. A gay lawyer who was present later enlisted the support of 21 other gay professionals in writing a letter of complaint to the Chief of Police. To their surprise, they received an apology. This was the last documented case of police harassment at gay discos for many years to come.

The local media, especially the daily tabloid The New Paper, began to sensationalise homosexual activities with attention-grabbing headlines like 'Pool Perverts on the Loose' and 'Gays surface again at East Coast beach'. In 1992, the Censorship Review Committee recommended that 'materials encouraging homosexuality should continue to be disallowed.' In 1996, I-S Magazine's publishing licence was suspended for one issue because of gay content appearing in the personal ads section.

An example of this government censorship was directed at Chay Yew, who, in the 1990s, had become an internationally known playwright with several plays featuring gay individuals and couples. The government banned performances of his work on the grounds that it was "promoting homosexuality" and, as a result, Yew felt pressured to live and work overseas.

It was against this deterioration in public image and treatment that a Singapore gay movement emerged. The most revolutionary factor which surfaced to facilitate the development of a sense of community amongst Singaporean gays was the widespread availability of the Internet and start of affordable access to the World Wide Web from the mid-1990s.

Activists such as Alex Au, a member of People Like Us, the first gay equality organisation in Singapore, saw the potential of the Internet as a vehicle to unite the gay community and foment intellectual discussion. The Singapore Gay News List (SigNeL) was started on 15 March 1997 and has been instrumental in discussing issues of interest to the community. On 15 October 1998, RedQuEEn!, an e-mail list for queer-identified women was established. Au also launched his Yawning Bread website in November 1996, to which he would contribute the most thorough analyses of issues facing the local gay community. It would also serve as a de facto chronicle of Singapore gay issues and history as they unfolded.

LGBTs could visit foreign websites to remain updated on gay news from around the globe or even view and download pornography, thus effectively bypassing Singapore's Undesirable Publications Act.

To enable censorship of undesirable sites, all Internet traffic into and out of Singapore was required to be routed through local proxy servers. As a token of this restriction, to placate social conservatives, prominent porn websites such as Playboy and Penthouse were blocked. The official explanation was that the Government wanted to signal a stand on undesirable sites without unduly hindering the development of the Internet. However, websites of local origin were monitored more closely than those from overseas.

One of the most important LGBTQ events of the decade took place in 1996 when People Like Us submitted their first application for registration as a society, after taking a year of painstaking effort to solicit ten signatories. The application was lodged with the Registrar of Societies on 7 November 1996. However, it was rejected on 9 April 1997 with no reason given. PLU's appeals all the way to the Prime Minister's Office met with no success. This rejection was reported by news agencies around the world.

For over two decades, post-operative trans people had been discreetly lobbying to be given the right to have their new sex reflected in their identity cards (but not their birth certificates) and to marry opposite-sex spouses. They were finally granted their wish on 24 January 1996 via an announcement by MP Abdullah Tarmugi without much public fanfare or opposition.

On 11 December 1998, Senior Minister Lee Kuan Yew responded to a gay man's question about the place of homosexuals in Singapore, live on CNN International by saying, '...what we are doing as a government is to leave people to live their own lives so long as they don't impinge on other people. I mean, we don't harass anybody.' Given Lee's stature as the venerated albeit authoritarian founding father of independent Singapore, these words helped set the tenor for official policy on homosexuality for many years to come. His comments may be regarded as one of the most significant events, as far as gay rights are concerned, of the decade.

On 12 December 1998, at the first National AIDS Conference, Paddy Chew became the first person in Singapore to publicly come out with HIV/AIDS. He subsequently worked with Haresh Sharma and Alvin Tan of The Necessary Stage on a one-man autobiographical play called Completely With/Out Character which was staged at The Drama Centre from 10 to 17 May 1999. He subsequently died from complications from AIDS at the Communicable Disease Centre on 21 August 1999.

== 2000s ==
=== 2002 ===
On 1 December 2002, the Sunday Times printed an extract of a speech made by Minister of State for Health, Balaji Sadasivan. He said, 'Research has also shown that the brain of homosexuals is structurally different from heterosexuals. It is likely therefore that the homosexual tendency is imprinted in the brain in utero and homosexuals must live with the tendencies that they inherit as a result of the structural changes in their brain. Within the moral and cultural constraints of our society, we should be tolerant of those who may be different from most of us.' This was the first time a Minister had publicly quoted scientific findings about homosexuality.

=== 2003 ===
The 7 July 2003 issue of Time Asia magazine carried a feature article entitled The Lion in Winter, which examined Singapore's prevailing bleak economic climate against a wider backdrop of Asian NIE malaise at the time. In the article, Prime Minister Goh Chok Tong was quoted as saying, "So let it evolve, and in time the population will understand that some people are born that way. We are born this way and they are born that way, but they are like you and me." He also stated that though homosexual acts remained illegal in Singapore, gay people would now be allowed to serve in 'sensitive positions' in the civil service. This started a major controversy in the media. The statement was greatly welcomed by the gay population of Singapore, but there was a strong reaction from those opposed to homosexuality. These included the National Council of Churches of Singapore, which issued a statement that homosexuality was incongruous with the scriptures of Christianity, and an independent group of 20 Christians from different denominations, voluntary organisations and professions, led by Pastor Yang Tuck Yoong, of the Cornerstone Community Church. This group held a meeting to discuss a strategy and plan of action for Christians to tackle what they termed as a "volatile situation", and Yang's church issued a statement "Don't Keep Silent" on 20 July, calling on the Church in Singapore to "take a stand". Following this, many letters opposing homosexuality were published in Singapore's daily, The Straits Times.

Several prominent members of the Singaporean Christian community disagreed with the stance taken by the National Council of Churches, including Reverend Yap Kim Hao, the former bishop of the Methodist Church in Singapore, and Catholic Theresa Seow, President of the (Singapore) Inter-Religious Organisation.

Reporter M. Nirmala of the Straits Times covered the controversy in her article on 23 July 2003, titled "Gay Backlash". The debate and its political implications are also documented and discussed in an article "Imagining the Gay Community in Singapore", whose abstract is:

Through an analysis of public responses to two separate but related events in contemporary Singapore – a church's claim that "homosexuals can change" and a former prime minister's published comments about openly gay civil servants in his administration – this article explores how a "gay community" has been imagined in Singapore, where homosexual acts remain illegal and where a "conservative majority" has been ideologically mobilised by the state and moral-religious entrepreneurs. A close reading of the debates within SiGNeL (the Singapore Gay News List) and the local mass media reveals ideological struggles – and, in particular, gay activists' role in these struggles – surrounding a basic contradiction between Singapore's exclusionary laws and practices, and official state rhetoric about active citizenship, social diversity, and gradual liberalisation. This rhetoric is aimed primarily at attracting foreign talent and retaining mobile Singaporean talent in a globally integrated economy that is increasingly dependent upon creativity and innovation.

=== 2004 ===
==== LGBTQ film banned in Singapore ====
In July 2004, Formula 17, a Chinese-language teenage romantic comedy and Taiwan's highest-grossing film of the year was banned because it "normalizes homosexuality". Singapore's Films Appeals Committee said that its panel members thought the movie "creates an illusion of a homosexual utopia, where everyone, including passersby, is homosexual and no ills or problems are reflected...It conveys the message that homosexuality is normal, and a natural progression of society".

==== Collaboration between local NGO and LGBTQ platform ====
In November 2004, a partnership between Action For AIDS (AFA)'s MSM Resources and SGBOY.COM was announced in November 2004, volunteers from MSM Resources will be participating in SGBOY.COM's online forums and IRC chat room – which are the region's busiest for gay Asian men. The move follows stinging criticism from the Minister of State for Health Balaji Sadasivan this month in which he said the homosexual community was mostly to blame for an "alarming AIDS epidemic" in Singapore.

==== LGBTQ party banned ====
In December 2004, the government turned down an application by gay dating platform Fridae to hold its Snowball.04 party on 25 December because the event was "likely to be organised as a gay party which is contrary to public interest," according to Prime Minister Lee Hsien Loong. Lee said that in previous editions of the party in 2002 and 2003, assurances were sought from party organisers that the event would include the wider community. "We allowed it and we made it quite clear that it had to be a party which was not targeted at gays alone," Lee said. "As the party turned out, our sense of it was that it was beyond what we were prepared to accept. So we said no."

=== 2005 ===
On 21 May 2005, the Straits Times reported that 3 teenagers was infected with the HIV virus in 2004, the biggest in a year since 1985, when HIV was first detected in Singapore. Before 2004, Ministry of Health figures showed only 1 teen at most per year tested positive for HIV. Another alarming change was that the infected teens in the past two years were gay. Previously, the 3 teens infected between 2000 and 2002 had been heterosexual. In 2005, the lone 17-year-old student who had so far tested positive for HIV was also gay. He was presumably infected by his older partner who pressured him into having unprotected sex, according to Action for AIDS programme director Roger Winder. On 6 December 2005, UK newspaper The Daily Telegraph reported that a Singaporean man Ghani Jantan and his British partner John Walker were the first gay couple to announce their civil union in the print version of the widely read British daily. The pair were amongst the first wave of more than 1000 homosexual couples to take advantage of the civil partnership law which grants gay unions almost all the legal rights and obligations which apply to heterosexual marriages. The story was also carried by Singapore's Today newspaper.

In June 2005, government authorities turned down an application by gay dating platform Fridae to host its fifth annual Nation party because "police assessment is that the event is likely to be organised as a gay party, which is contrary to public interest in general." The party coincided each year with Singapore's National Day and had been held four times previously. Organisers said more than 8,000 people attended the last one in 2004, generating an estimated S$6 million in tourist revenue for the country.

Junior health minister Balaji Sadasivan said a rise in HIV infections in the gay community was linked to the parties as they "allowed gays from high-prevalence societies to fraternise with local gay men, seeding the infection in the local community." Expressing his disappointment at the government's decision, Fridae CEO Stuart Koe, said, "This is a direct contradiction to previous calls for embracing of diversity."

As a reaction to the banning of the Nation party, LGBTQ event organisers came together to start IndigNation, a month-long series of events held during Pride month. In August 2004, just days after being sworn in as prime minister, Lee Hsien Loong had promised a more "open and inclusive" Singapore, saying, "The police have now decided to exempt indoor talks from licensing requirements, unless they touch on sensitive issues such as race and religion." Community leaders seized on the promise to organise talks, workshops, and related events as part of the line-up for IndigNation, which would evolve to be an annual affair.

=== 2006 ===
==== Film depicting gay scene shown uncensored ====
In February 2006, Singapore announced it would be screening Brokeback Mountain, a romantic drama film directed by Ang Lee, on local screens uncut. The film received an R21 rating for depictions of homosexual sexual activities which restricted it to people over 21. Amy Chua, director of media content at the Media Development Authority said the Board of Film Censors allowed Brokeback Mountain to be screened because the film did not "promote or glamorise the lifestyle."

=== 2007 ===
In response to a question from the youth wing of the PAP in 2007, Lee Kuan Yew said, "This business of homosexuality. It raises tempers all over the world, and even in America. If in fact it is true, and I’ve asked doctors this, that you are genetically born a homosexual, because that is the nature of genetic random transmission of genes. You can't help it. So why should we criminalise it?... But there is such a strong inhibition in all societies – Christianity, Islam, even the Hindu, Chinese societies. And we’re now confronted with a persisting aberration, but is it an aberration? It's a genetic variation. So what do we do? I think we pragmatically adjust."

Four years later, in an interview granted to journalists for the book Hard Truths to Keep Singapore Going, Lee was asked if he thought homosexuality was a lifestyle or genetic. He said, "No, it's not a lifestyle. You can read the books all you want, all the articles. There's a genetic difference, so it's not a matter of choice. They are born that way and that's that. So if two men or two women are that way, just leave them alone."

Asked how he would feel if one of his children came out to him, Lee said, "That's life. They're born with that genetic code, that's that. Dick Cheney didn't like gays but his daughter was born like that. He says, 'I still love her, full stop.' It's happened to his family. So on principle he's against it, but it's his daughter. Do you throw the daughter out? That's life. I mean none of my children is gay, but if they were, well that's that."

Saying he took a "purely practical view" on the issue, Lee said, "Look, homosexuality will eventually be accepted. It's already been accepted in China. It's only a matter of time before it is accepted here. If we get a Cabinet full of Christians, we’re going to get an intolerant Cabinet. We’re not going to allow that."

Asked whether Singapore was ready for a gay member of parliament, Lee said, "As far as I'm concerned, if she does her work as an MP, she looks after her constituents, she makes sensible speeches, she's making a contribution, her private life is her life, that's that."

In a wide-ranging interview conducted on 24 Aug. 2007 at the Istana with Leonard M. Apcar, deputy managing editor of the International Herald Tribune, Singapore correspondent Wayne Arnold, and Southeast Asia bureau chief Seth Mydans, Lee said, "we take an ambiguous position. We say, O.K., leave them alone but let's leave the law as it is for the time being and let's have no gay parades."

"Don't ask, don't tell?" asked the reporters. "Yes, we've got to go the way the world is going. China has already allowed and recognized gays, so have Hong Kong and Taiwan," Lee responded. "It's a matter of time. But we have a part Muslim population, another part conservative older Chinese and Indians. So, let's go slowly. It's a pragmatic approach to maintain social cohesion."

==== Parliamentary petition to repeal Section 377 ====
External videos
- Report by Al Jazeera English on the failed bid to repeal S377A in 2007, Youtube video

In October 2007, a parliamentary petition to repeal Section 377A Penal Code was jointly organised by Fridae founder Stuart Koe, human rights lawyer George Hwang and housewife Tan Joo Hymn, garnering thousands of signatories for an open letter to the prime minister. Anti-gay activists sprang to action in a counter-appeal that urged the government to "Keep 377A", claiming even more signatories.

On 22 October 2007, three organisers of the Open Letter, theatre practitioner Ivan Heng, entrepreneur Alan Seah and actress Pamela Oei hand delivered the 400-page letter with 8,120 signatures to the Prime Minister's office at the Istana.

Nominated Member of Parliament Siew Kum Hong tabled the petition to Parliament to repeal Section 377A. Members of Parliament who spoke in favour of the repeal included PAP MPs Charles Chong, Baey Yam Keng and Hri Kumar Nair.

NMP Thio Li-ann gave an impassioned speech against repeal, famously likening gay sex to "shoving a straw up your nose to drink". She said she spoke "at the risk of being burned at the stake by militant activists" and warned of a "radical", "homosexual agenda" that was out to "subvert social morality, the common good and undermine our liberties."

Opposition MP Sylvia Lim said the Workers' Party did not take a stand regarding appeal. She proposed the setting up of a Select Committee to scrutinise the wording and execution of the Penal Code and to comprehensively archive and make publicly available feedback from all civic groups.

Senior minister of state for Law and Home Affairs, Associate Professor Ho Peng Kee, said that Singapore was generally still a "conservative" society and that the majority of its people still found homosexual behaviour "unacceptable". The government therefore chose to "let the situation evolve naturally" and to allow Section 377A to remain status quo.

Prime minister Lee Hsien Loong said Singapore was "basically a conservative society" with many being "uncomfortable with homosexuals, more so with public display of homosexual behaviour". However, as recognition that homosexuals "are often responsible, invaluable, and highly respected contributing members of society", the government would not "proactively enforce Section 377A on them."

He said his government did not "consider homosexuals a minority, in the sense that we consider, say, Malays and Indians as minorities, with minority rights protected under the law" and that it would not "allow or encourage activists to champion gay rights as they do in the West."

"The decision on whether or not to decriminalise gay sex is a very divisive one and until there is a broader consensus on the matter, Singapore will stick to the status quo," he added.

=== 2008 ===
In January 2008, cinema operator Golden Village kicked off its first ever The Love and Pride Film Festival, an annual event dedicated to the screening of LGBTQ films.

=== 2009 ===
==== Pink Dot SG ====
Following the relaxation of rules governing activities conducted at Singapore's Speakers' Corner at Hong Lim Park, allowing demonstrations organised by Singaporeans to be held at the park, the first Pink Dot SG event took place at the Speakers' Corner on 16 May 2009.

Launched with a campaign video titled "RED + WHITE = PINK", this was Singapore's first public, open-air, pro-LGBTQ event and drew an estimated crowd of 2,500, breaking the record for the greatest turnout for a gathering at Speakers' Corner in Hong Lim Park since the venue's inception.

Ambassadors of the event were three local celebrities: actor Timothy Nga, actress Neo Swee Lin and radio DJ Rosalyn Lee. During the event, formations of the words "LOVE" and "4All" were created by participants. The event concluded with the formation of the titular Pink Dot.

==== Attempted takeover of local Association for Women's equality ====
In 2009, a group of conservative Christian women took over the Association of Women for Action and Research (AWARE) by winning 9 out of 12 available seats on the executive committee. It was subsequently known that six out of nine of the new members of the committee were members of the same church, the Anglican Church of Our Saviour (COOS) located at Margaret Drive.

At the time, AWARE's Constitution allowed new members to stand for elections. The group engineered a takeover under the leadership of Josie Lau and organisation by Thio Su Mien, nominating and voting in new members to the executive committee. They alleged that AWARE was harbouring and pushing a "pro-gay agenda".

Thio told reporters that she had encouraged the women to take over AWARE because she felt that AWARE's original focus on gender equality had shifted, claiming that "Aware seems to be only very interested in lesbianism and the advancement of homosexuality". She then attacked AWARE's sex education syllabus, which came under the Ministry of Education's (MOE) Comprehensive Sex Education (CSE) programme. Thio claimed that AWARE's sex education had encouraged local students to view homosexuality in 'neutral' terms instead of 'negatively', warning that "this is something which should concern parents in Singapore".

The new members had changed the locks and the security system at the AWARE Centre in Dover Crescent without the knowledge of the "Old Guard".

Eventually, after meetings between members of the "Old Guard", they decided to challenge the new executive committee at an Extraordinary General Meeting (EGM) on 2 May 2009. The EGM finally concluded, after over eight hours, with a vote of no confidence in the "New Guard", and a new executive committee elected with a mix of old and new members of AWARE.

Deputy Prime minister Wong Kan Seng commented that "a group of conservative Christians, all attending the same church, which held strong views on homosexuality, had moved in and taken over AWARE because they disapproved of what AWARE had been doing", and called for tolerance, cautioning that religion and politics must be kept separate.

== 2010s ==
=== 2010 ===
==== Local church's anti LGBTQ sermon ====
In February 2010, a video containing anti-gay remarks made by Rony Tan, the senior pastor of megachurch Lighthouse Evangelism, was circulated online. "Proper sex means life. Lesbianism and homosexuality simply mean death, barrenness," said Tan in the video.

"Don't believe all those loud-mouthed gay people who tell you they are born this way", Tan added. "If we don't warn people against this, then there will be more and more homosexuals... many of these people will be harassing and seducing young boys, and they in turn will become homosexuals... half the world will be homosexual".

He also linked homosexuality with bestiality: "If you allow [homosexuality], next time people will want to get married to monkeys. And they will want rights. They'll want to apply for HDB [a colloquial term to mean a government subsidised flat]. With a donkey or a monkey or a dog and so on. It's very pathetic."

A total of 85 police reports were lodged against Tan, including by local filmmakers Royston Tan and Sun Koh. Tan did not rescind his comments, nor was he censured by the authorities for his remarks.

=== 2013 ===
==== Legal challenge on the Constitution ====
In May 2013, the High Court struck out an application by a gay man seeking a declaration that Article 12 of the Constitution applies to all, regardless of sexual orientation. Lawrence Bernard Wee Kim San, then 40, claimed to have been harassed into resigning from his position as assistant general manager for cards and corporate sales at Robinson's department store because of his homosexuality. He was also ordered by the court to pay the costs of his case. The Attorney General's Chambers, in a statement, said Wee's "real grievance of alleged discrimination is against his former employer, and not the Government", and described his claim as being "not sustainable in law", "frivolous and vexatious" and "an abuse of the Court process".

==== Investigation of Adam Lambert concert by the National Council of Churches of Singapore ====
In May 2013, the National Council of Churches of Singapore (NCCS) said it was looking into a complaint about Adam Lambert performing at The Star Performing Arts Centre, a commercial entity fully owned by Rock Productions, the business arm of New Creation Church. Lim K. Tham, general secretary of the council said it had received a complaint that "the gay lifestyle may be promoted at the concert" and that "The NCCS has conveyed this concern to New Creation so that it can make a response."

In a statement, the church said that according to stipulations from the authorities before the tender was awarded to Rock Productions, the venue had to operate "on a purely commercial basis and will not implement any leasing or pricing policies that will discriminate between religious groups, institutions or organisations from hiring the venue". The church said all public events require a public entertainment licence from the police, and it had "utmost confidence" in the policies and ability of government bodies such as the Media Development Authority to "protect the interest of the general public". The statement added that any event at the performing arts centre "should not be misconstrued or misunderstood" as the church "approving of its artistic presentation or endorsing the lifestyle of the performer".

=== 2014 ===
==== "Wear White" campaign in protest of Pink Dot SG event ====
To protest against the annual Pink Dot SG, a group of Muslims led by Ustaz Noor Deros, a theology graduate of Al-Azhar University who was employed at the En-Naeem mosque in Tampines, started a "Wear White" campaign, calling on people to return to "fitrah" – or purity – and "sunnah" – the way of Muhammad. In a message on the campaign website, Noor Deros wrote that the "natural state of human relationships is now under sustained attack by LGBT activists" and accused the organisers of Pink Dot of organising their event on the first day of Ramadan to "underline their disdain for Islam and the family".

Lawrence Khong, senior pastor of Faith Community Baptist Church and head of the LoveSingapore network of churches, urged Christians to wear white at church services that weekend in support of the movement. "We cannot and will not endorse homosexuality. We will continue to resist any public promotion of homosexuality as an alternative lifestyle," Khong wrote in a Facebook posting.

=== 2015 ===
==== Debate over Adam Lambert's performance in national broadcast New Year Countdown event ====
In December 2015, when it was announced that Adam Lambert would be performing at a Countdown 2016 New Year's Eve event, anti-gay groups sprang to action, petitioning the government to have the openly gay singer removed from the line-up. An open letter which gathered more than 20,000 signatures said "Singaporeans can enjoy a good show without their consciences being affronted by lewd acts in the name of entertainment" and that Lambert was "well known for his active promotion of a highly sexualized lifestyle and LGBT rights". A counter-petition by Lambert supporters subsequently attracted more than 24,000 signatures.

State broadcaster Mediacorp later confirmed that Lambert would perform, and assured audiences that the show would be "suitable for family audiences and conform with broadcast regulations". Adam Lambert said in a statement, "My performance at Celebrate 2016 will not only be a spectacular one, it will celebrate the entire human family in all its diversity. I am a uniter, not a divider, and I believe in celebrating the human heart and spirit".

=== 2016 ===
==== Ban on sponsorships by foreign companies for events held at Speakers' Corner ====
After Pink Dot SG events which attracted sponsorships from multinational companies such as Google, JP Morgan, Goldman Sachs, Apple, Barclays, Facebook, Twitter, Uber, Microsoft, NBCUniversal, Salesforce.com, Visa and General Electric, the Ministry of Home Affairs announced it would "take steps to make it clear that foreign entities should not fund, support or influence" events held at Speakers' Corner. The ministry said in a statement, "The Government's general position has always been that foreign entities should not interfere in our domestic issues, especially political issues or controversial social issues with political overtones. These are political, social or moral choices for Singaporeans to decide for ourselves. LGBTQ issues are one such example. This is why under the rules governing the use of the Speakers' Corner, for events like Pink Dot, foreigners are not allowed to organise or speak at the events, or participate in demonstrations."

In a letter to Home Minister K Shanmugam, Human Rights Watch said the ministry's statement sent a "discriminatory message" to Pink Dot's corporate sponsors: "This infringes on rights to freedom of expression, which the Universal Declaration of Human Rights guarantees to 'everyone', and pressures corporations to act in contravention of their responsibilities under the United Nations Guiding Principles on Business and Human Rights."

==== Threats to LGBTQ event ====
In the first case of its kind, a 36-year-old man Bryan Lim Sian Yang was charged in June 2016 with inciting violence after he logged on to an anti-gay Facebook group "We are against Pinkdot in Singapore" and wrote: "I am a Singaporean citizen. I am a NSman, I am a father. And I swore to protect my nation. Give me the permission to open fire. I would like to see these £@€$^*s die for their causes". Lim posted his comment on 4 June and it subsequently went viral after the 12 June Orlando nightclub shooting which killed 49 mostly LGBTQ victims, sparking a huge uproar. Multiple police reports were filed and police seized his desktop, laptop and mobile phone as they launched investigations. Lim apologised, saying his comment was "taken out of context". "I did not mean physical bullets nor physical death," he wrote. "I mean open fire in debate and remove them from Singapore domestic matters." His employer Canon Singapore issued a statement denouncing his comment and said the company was "looking into this matter". Lim was eventually found guilty of making a threatening, abusive or insulting communication under the Protection from Harassment Act and fined S$3,500.

=== 2017 ===
==== Local companies supporting LGBTQ event ====
As a result of amendments to Singapore's Public Order Act, which was decried by human rights group Amnesty International, foreigners trying to attend the 9th Pink Dot SG event now faced arrest and if found guilty, could be fined S$20,000 or jailed for a year. Organisers barricaded Hong Lim Park and checked the identity card of each participant at checkpoints.

20 local companies contributed more than S$200,000 to the event which was above the target of S$150,000 of Pink Dot SG.

=== 2018 ===
==== Debate over children's books with LGBTQ themes at the National Library Singapore ====
In July 2018, the discovery of three children's books with LGBTQ themes at the National Library Singapore sparked an uproar and an ensuing debate over literary censorship. The three books were And Tango Makes Three, based on the true story of Roy and Silo, two male chinstrap penguins who fell in love in New York's Central Park Zoo; The White Swan Express, which features children adopted by straight, gay, mixed-race and single parents; and Who's in My Family?, which discusses different types of families, including gay couples.

The National Library Board said in a statement that it took "a pro-family and cautious approach in identifying titles for our young visitors" and that it planned to withdraw the books from the libraries and to pulp them. The move sparked vocal opposition and thousands signed duelling petitions for and against the destruction of the books. In protest, 400 people including parents descended at the library to read the books to their children.

Writers Gwee Li Sui, Adrian Tan, Prem Anand and Felix Cheong cancelled their panel at the Central Public Library as part of the Read! Singapore initiative. Novelist and playwright Ovidia Yu resigned from the steering committee of the Singapore Writers Festival and Gwee also declined to speak at the National Schools Literature Festival.

Information minister Yaacob Ibrahim said he stood by the board's decision to remove the three books from the children's section and that the board would "continue to ensure that books in the children's section are age-appropriate". He said he had instructed the board not to pulp the books but to place them in the adult section. "The decision on what books children can or cannot read remains with their parents. Parents who wish to borrow these books to read with their children will have the option to do so," the minister said.

It emerged that the copies of Who's in My Family? had already been destroyed. Separately, a volume of the Archie comics series had been banned because its depiction of a marriage between two men was deemed to have breached social norms.

==== Gay man allowed to adopt biological son born via surrogacy ====
In a landmark case in December 2018, the High Court allowed a 46-year-old gay man to adopt his five-year-old biological son who was born through surrogacy in the United States, and then brought to Singapore on a long-term visit pass. When an application for Singapore citizenship for the boy was rejected, he approached the Ministry of Social and Family Development for advice and was told his prospects would be enhanced if the child was legally adopted. The man then applied as a single parent to adopt the child in December 2014 but the application was dismissed three years later by a district judge who said it was "ethically problematic" to go overseas to procure a child through surrogacy.

=== 2019 ===
==== Local singer dropped by record label for coming out ====
Pop singer Willie Tay, known previously as Wiltay, relaunched his career as independent singer Wils in April 2019. Tay was discovered while on holiday in Madrid in 2012 and subsequently signed on with Warner Music Singapore for 3 years before winning Best Pop Album at the Hollywood F.A.M.E. Awards in 2014 for his debut album, WTF.

He was dropped by his Asian record label for being gay and his social media accounts deleted. In 2019, he officially came out to his fans with his new single and music video, Open Up Babe.

==== Legal protections for the LGBTQ community in amendments to the Maintenance of Religious Harmony Act ====
In the 2019 amendments to the Maintenance of Religious Harmony Act, an Explanatory Statement to the new section 17E which deals with religious-based violence clarifies, "The target group need not be confined to persons who practise a certain religion. The target group may be made up of atheists, individuals from a specific racial community, who share a similar sexual orientation, or have a certain nationality or descent like foreign workers or new citizens." LGBTQ advocacy group Sayoni described the move as "the first time a law in Singapore explicitly extends protections to cover sexual orientation."

==== Former Chief Justice on Section 377A of the Penal Code ====
In a 72-page analysis published in the Singapore Academy of Law Journal titled "Equal Justice Under The Constitution And Section 377A Of The Penal Code, The Roads Not Taken", based on a talk he gave in February at the National University of Singapore law faculty's Centre for Asian Legal Studies, former Chief Justice Chan Sek Keong said Section 377A was enacted in 1938 to deal with male prostitution and not because such conduct was unacceptable in Singapore society then. As the original purpose of the section was no longer valid, it ceased to satisfy the reasonable classification test requirements and therefore violates Article 12(1) of the Constitution, which guarantees the equality of all before the law.

== 2020s ==
=== Constitutional challenges to Section 377A dismissed ===
In March 2020, three separate legal challenges to strike down Section 377A were dismissed by the High Court. The civil suits were brought by three gay men: disc jockey Johnson Ong Ming, former executive director of advocacy group Oogachaga Bryan Choong, and retired general practitioner Dr Roy Tan Seng Kee. In passing the judgement, Justice See Kee Oon said "Statutory provisions serve an important role in reflecting public sentiment and beliefs. Section 377A, in particular, serves the purpose of safeguarding public morality by showing societal moral disapproval of male homosexual acts."

In December 2020, Dr Roy Tan Seng Kee filed a fresh legal challenge to force the government to either fully enforce or scrap Section 377A. Tan said the argument of inconsistencies had rarely been used before.

==== Local broadcaster issues apology for gay paedophile character in TV drama series ====
State broadcaster Mediacorp sparked outrage when their Channel 8 drama series My Guardian Angels starring Zoe Tay, featured a basketball coach with sexually transmitted infections who was eventually imprisoned for molesting teenage boys.

In July 2020, Mediacorp issued an apology following intense backlash from netizens who argued that the show unnecessarily perpetuated outdated and harmful LGBTQ+ stereotypes. The broadcaster said it had "no intention to disrespect or discriminate against the LGBTQ community in the drama" and the storyline was meant to "encourage young people to be aware of potential dangers and not be afraid to speak up and protect themselves".

==== Catholic church issues statement after Pope Francis endorses same-sex civil unions ====
In November 2020, the Archdiocese of Singapore issued a statement after the American documentary film, Francesco was premiered on 21 October 2020 at the Rome Film Festival. The film allegedly has Pope Francis supporting same-sex civil union with him saying: "Homosexuals have a right to be a part of the family. [...] What we have to create is a civil union law. That way they are legally covered. I stood up for that" from an interview in 2019. The statement from the Archdiocese stated that the Catholic Church's stance on marriage remains unchanged and the comment is not an official papal teaching"

=== Repeal of Section 377A, and definition of marriage ===
On 21 August 2022, Prime Minister Lee Hsien Loong announced Singapore would repeal the British colonial-era law banning gay sex between men, Section 377A. He nonetheless affirmed that current governmental policies on homosexuality will remain in place to preserve the concept of a traditional family as a social norm. On 29 November 2022, after a two-day debate, two bills were passed by the Singapore Parliament to repeal Section 377A and amend the Constitution with regards to the institution of marriage. The Constitutional amendment introduces Article 156, which contains provisions to limit the authority to define marriage to the Parliament, and that the definition of marriage being that between a man and a woman does not violate the constitutional right to equality. Law professor Eugene Tan commented that the intention is to "reduce the likelihood of constitutional challenges on laws and government policies that are premised on marriage being that between a man and a woman."

== See also ==
- Homosexuality in Singapore
- Timeline of LGBTQ history
- Pink Dot SG
