= Paddy Chew =

Singaporean AIDS activist

- Born: 29 March 1960; Katong Beach, Singapore
- Died: 21 August 1999 (aged 39)
- Cause of death: Complications of HIV Infection.
- Occupations: Cabaret writer, actor
- Known for: The first publicly identified AIDS victim in Singapore.

Paddy Chew Hong Lim (Chinese: 周丰林; Pe̍h-ōe-jī: Chiu Hong-lîm; 29 March 1960 – 21 August 1999) was the first Singaporean person with HIV/AIDS to come out to the general public.

== Early life ==
He attended St. Stephen's School and St. Patrick's School before becoming a flight steward. He worked for Singapore Airlines for thirteen years, after which he joined the Boom Boom Room, Singapore's first drag cabaret.

== Early decline ==
Chew was not aware of AIDS or HIV during the first half of his career as a flight attendant, and never used a condom. He began practising safe sex after hearing of the disease in 1986 or '87, but fell ill in 1995, two years after leaving Singapore Airlines. His hospital caretakers were inexperienced with his condition, failing to recognise his oral thrush until he made the diagnosis. He was put through a series of standard medical tests before being administered an HIV test at his request, to the reluctance of his doctors.

After his diagnosis he was relieved to know what was wrong. He travelled to Brussels to begin receiving treatment unavailable in Singapore at the time, but by 1996 he had lost 45% of his weight and his health was failing rapidly.

Out of an inability to function and a desire to prevent scandalising his workplace should his condition be discovered, he left the Boom Boom Room.

== Coming out ==
On 12 December 1998, during the First National AIDS Conference in Singapore, Chew became the first Singaporean AIDS patient to publicly declare his disease, but he was not the first AIDS patient in Singapore.

== Publicity ==
He became a public figure overnight, giving many interviews and inviting attention everywhere he went. His likeness and words on AIDS in Singapore were printed in local and foreign publications. His public position drew controversy. A columnist in the Chinese-language daily Lianhe Zaobao criticised him for being a promiscuous bisexual while others considered him a publicity-seeker.

Responding to the allegations, Chew retorted, "I do not mind being famous for winning the Miss Universe crown, or as a singer, or a beautiful face, you know? Who wants to be famous for having AIDS? For goodness sake!...I have seen too many AIDS patients die. Most die alone. There is no warmth, no care for them. They are not ready to die- you can see it in their eyes. I told myself I had to do something worthwhile for myself and for the cause- to clear the path for future patients, so that they will not die like that."

== Completely With/Out Character ==
In 1998, he began working on a one-man autobiographical play called Completely With/Out Character, his debut effort. The final version was produced by The Necessary Stage, written by Haresh Sharma, directed by Alvin Tan and staged at The Drama Centre from 10–17 May 1999. At the end of each performance, Chew would strip to his shorts and raise his arms to allow the audience to take in his emaciated frame. This was followed by a frank question and answer session. All proceeds from the play were donated to the charity organisation for which he was an outspoken volunteer, Action for AIDS (AfA). Reviewing the play in The Straits Times, poet and playwright Alfian Sa'at called Completely With/Out Character "the most extreme form of docu-theatre", writing, "The audience was given the privilege of witnessing a play, which, like its subject, was too aware of its ephemeral existence".

Chew dreamed aloud of writing a book and taking a last holiday in Europe, but his last wishes were not to be. His health deteriorated rapidly, necessitating his admission to the Communicable Disease Centre (CDC) in Moulmein Road in June 1999, 2 months before his death.

At the M1 Singapore Fringe Festival 2015, artist Zihan Loo presented With/Out, a performance installation based on Chew's monologue Completely With/Out Character. Loo told The Straits Times: "As a queer person, I have always been inspired by Paddy's strength and fortitude. I often wonder, if I was put in his position, whether I would have the courage to step out like he did." With/Out also featured the first public screening of taped performances from three evenings of Completely With/Out Character.

== Death ==
Chew died at the CDC from complications of HIV infection at 6:15 a.m. on 21 August 1999, three months after his play's run ended.

Chew's sister, who declined to be named, and Alvin Tan, the Artistic Director of The Necessary Stage were by his bedside. Tan called the press to request for help in informing Chew's friends about his funeral service at 3:45 p.m. at the Mount Vernon Crematorium, Hall two. Chew's family requested that there be "no wreaths, no sad tears, no black attire and for everybody to dress glam".

== Funeral ==
Dance music played at Mount Vernon Crematorium's Hall Two and the mourners came dressed in red, blue, pink and orange. People with AIDS must be buried or cremated within 24 hours of death in Singapore, so his funeral was held that very afternoon, with about 80 people present.

Chew's sister Jessie, 37, said in her short eulogy, "He wanted everyone to come, preferably in red, and party with him." She said that her brother remained full of spirit and fought all the way to the end.

There also were 2 older siblings present, Shirley, 53 and Edwin, 52. Another sister, Joanne, 41, was living abroad. 2 others, the managing director of Boom Boom Room, Alan Koh and an old friend, Audrey Fegen, gave additional eulogies.

The service, led by Roman Catholic priest Augustine, lasted less than half-an-hour. Calvin Tan, 38, a friend of Chew's since Primary 1, said: "He was in critical condition at 8 p.m. on Friday, but he was a fighter. He fought from 8 p.m. to 6 this morning. He refused to give up."

Action for Aids president, Assoc. Prof. Roy Chan, who knew Chew since he was diagnosed with AIDS in 1995 and who worked closely with him on several AIDS awareness projects, said: "Paddy was a very outspoken person. He had a lot of guts to do what he did. He was selfless and courageous. He did not do it for himself, but for society."
