= Loo Zihan =

Singaporean actor and director

- 罗子涵
- Born: 11 November 1983 (age 43)
- Education: School of the Art Institute of Chicago
- Occupations: Actor, film director and dancer
- Years active: 2007–present
- Awards: Young Artist Award (2017); Best Multimedia Design (2017)

Chinese name
- Traditional Chinese: 羅子涵
- Simplified Chinese: 罗子涵
Transcriptions
Standard Mandarin
- Hanyu Pinyin: luō zi hán
- Website: www.loozihan.com

Loo Zihan (simplified Chinese: 罗子涵; traditional Chinese: 羅子涵; pinyin: Luō Zi Hán; born 11 November 1983), is a Singaporean actor, film director, artist and dancer. He was a part-time teacher at School of the Arts, Singapore, National Institute of Education, and Nanyang Technological University.

== Early life and education ==
He received his Masters of Fine Arts (Studio) from the School of the Art Institute of Chicago and Master's of Arts in Performance Studies from New York University. He is currently a candidate for a Ph.D in theater and performance from UC Berkeley.

== Career ==
He has been open about both his own homosexuality and depicting gay themes in his films, despite the subject being particularly taboo in Southeast Asian society.

His first film, Solos, was withdrawn from its début screening at the 20th Singapore International Film Festival in 2007 due to its explicit depiction of homosexual sex. Instead it premièred at the 12th Busan International Film Festival in the city of Pusan in South Korea and became the first Singaporean film to be selected for the American Film Institute Festival in Los Angeles, going on to win the Nuovo Sguardi Award in the 23rd Turin Gay and Lesbian Festival, in the city of Turin in Italy. It was awarded by the jury to the film which "reflects the evolution of queer cinema".

Loo appeared in Pleasure Factory, a film directed by Thai director Ekachai Uekrongtham about the red-light district in Geylang, Singapore. The film premiered in the Un Certain Regard section of the 2007 Cannes Film Festival.

In February 2012, as part of the M1 Singapore Fringe Festival, Loo staged a one-night only performance of Cane, which re-enacted a performance art piece by Singaporean artist Josef Ng that resulted in a 10-year no-funding rule for performance art. In December, Loo organised his first solo exhibition Archiving Cane at The Substation, which consisted of an installation of 12 artefacts to do with Cane and Loo's artistic practice, along with a durational performance.

From October to December 2013, Loo put on Artists' General Assembly – The Langenbach Archive, a durational performance-cum-installation as part of Ghost: The Body at the Turn of the Century group exhibition, a parallel event of the Singapore Biennale. The installation archived a selection of approximately 150 of Dr. Ray Langenbach's materials surrounding the Artists' General Assembly and its peripheral events.

Loo was awarded the Young Artist Award by the National Arts Council of Singapore in 2015. He was commissioned to produce an installation for the Presidents' Young Talents competition at the Singapore Art Museum in the same year.

Loo opened the M1 Singapore Fringe Festival 2015 with With/Out, a performance installation based on The Necessary Stage's Completely With/Out Character (1999), a monologue by the late Paddy Chew, the first person in Singapore to come out as being HIV-positive. Loo told The Straits Times: "As a queer person, I have always been inspired by Paddy's strength and fortitude. I often wonder, if I was put in his position, whether I would have the courage to step out like he did." With/Out featured the first public screening of taped performances from three evenings of Completely With/Out Character, which Chew performed a few months before his death.

In 2016, Loo was commissioned by the Singapore International Festival of Arts to stage I Am LGB, a four-hour durational performance created in collaboration with Dr. Ray Langenbach and the LGB Society of Mind. The performance included materials from Dr. Ray Langenbach's archive.

With/Out was restaged in 2017, commissioned as part of The Studios season featuring the works by Singaporean playwright Haresh Sharma at Esplanade, Theatres on the Bay. The restaging featured actor and ex-Member of Parliament Janice Koh performing the text from Completely With/Out Character in cadence with video documentation of the 1999 performance.

He won 'Best Multimedia Design' for Manifesto, a theatre production by The Necessary Stage and Drama Box Singapore at the Straits Times Life! Theatre Awards 2017.

== Filmography and theatrical works ==
- With/Out (2017 / 2015 play) — director
- I Am LGB (2016 theatre production) — collaborator and artist
- Manifesto (2016 play) — multimedia design
- "Chancre" (2011 short film) — director
- "Aemaer" (2010 short film) — director
- Threshold (2009 film) — writer and director
- Past Carin' (2009 play) — multimedia design
- Frozen Angels (2009 play) — multimedia design
- Gemuk Girls (2008 play) — multimedia design
- Pleasure Factory (2007 film) — actor
- Solos (2007 film) — writer, director and actor
- Autopsy (2007 documentary short) — writer, director and actor
- Embryo (2006 short film) — writer, director
- Untitled (2006 short film) — writer, director and actor
