= Migrant Worker Poetry Competition =

The Migrant Worker Poetry Competition is an annual competition that recognises outstanding poetry written by migrant workers, either in English or their native language, in Singapore. It was launched in 2014. Winners are selected by a judging panel comprising playwrights and poets with the top three poets receive $500, $300 and $200 respectively. Past judges include Haresh Sharma, Alvin Pang and Amanda Chong.

The competition was initiated by travel writer Shivaji Das and is organised by a team of volunteers and former participants. It is sponsored by the United States Embassy in Singapore.

A Malaysian edition was first held in Kuala Lumpur in 2015, featuring poetry by migrant workers and refugees. Similar competitions have also been launched in Hong Kong and Abu Dhabi.

== History ==
The Migrant Worker Poetry Competition was launched in 2014 when organiser Shivaji Das was a volunteer with non-profit organisation Transient Workers Count Too (TWC2). Das was inspired to showcase a different side of migrant workers and push back against stereotypes that society held of them.

The 2014 competition had 28 participants, all Bangladeshi workers. By 2016 it had grown to 70 participants. The 2017 competition received 107 submissions in 7 languages, and was the first time all three competition winners were women. In 2018, there were 120 participants.

The contest has since expanded to Malaysia, where there are a sizeable number of Rohingya refugees.

In 2018, there were 120 participants.

== Impact ==
Many contest participants have gone on to create more literary and artistic work, participating and collaborating with fellow artists in events such as the Singapore Writers Festival.

Former winner, Zakir Hossain Khokon, co-edited a poetry anthology called Migrant Tales, which was launched at the 2016 competition finals.

Two film documentaries have been produced about the competition.

Former participants wrote, directed and performed a play at the 2017 competition finals, under the mentorship of judge and playwright Haresh Sharma.

== Previous Winners ==
Winners of Migrant Workers Poetry Competition
Year	Name	Poem	Ref
2014	Zakir Hossain Khokon	Pocket 2	
2015	Zakir Hossain Khokon	I Am Sorry	
2016	Bikas Nath	Keno Probashi? (Why Migrant?)	
2017	Deni Apriyani	Further Away	
2018	Sugiarti Mutiarjo	My Lady	
