= Corridor (short story collection) =

- Book cover
- Author: Alfian Sa'at
- Language: English
- Genre: Short story collection
- Publisher: Raffles, SNP
- Publication date: 1999
- Publication place: Singapore
- Media type: Print (paperback)
- Pages: 154
- ISBN: 981-4032-40-9
- OCLC: 42753130
- LC Class: MLCS 98/00278 (P)

Corridor is a 1999 collection of short stories by Alfian Sa'at, all set in present-day Singapore. It received a Singapore Literature Prize Commendation Award for 1998. It was first published by SNP Editions in 1999, and republished by Ethos Books in 2015.

== Contents ==
- "Project"
- "Video"
- "Orphans"
- "Pillow"
- "Corridor"
- "Duel"
- "Winners"
- "Cubicle"
- "Umbrella"
- "Bugis"
- "Birthday"
- "Disco"

== Awards and nominations ==
- 1998 Singapore Literature Prize Commendation Award

== Publication history ==
- 1999, Singapore, Raffles (SNP imprint), ISBN 981-4032-40-9, paperback
- 2015, Singapore, Ethos Books, 978-981-07-7993-1, paperback
