= Trevvy =

LGBTQ website in Singapore

Trevvy.com
- Company type: Privately held company
- Founded: March 5, 1999; 27 years ago
- Defunct: April 30, 2021
- Headquarters: Singapore
- Products: Trevvy.com (Website)
- Website: Trevvy.com

TREVVY was an LGBTQ website in Singapore. Started August 2006 through a re-branding exercise of Singapore's first gay portal, Trevvy ceased operation in 2021. At one point, Trevvy had over 120,000 registered users.

In February 2007, Trevvy.com was awarded the Hitwise Online Performance Award recognizing it as the most visited gay and lesbian website in Singapore.

In August 2007, Trevvy.com launched an HIV/AIDS awareness campaign called Evolve which was the first such campaign in Singapore to use digital animation.

Trevvy.com was awarded the Arts Supporter Award by Singapore's National Arts Council for its contributions towards the local arts scene.

On 20 April 2021, Trevvy.com announced on their Facebook page its closure effective 30 April 2021.

== See also ==
- Homosocialization
