= Solos (film) =

- Film poster
- Directed by: Kan Lume; Loo Zihan
- Written by: Loo Zihan
- Based on: Untitled by Kan Lume; Loo Zihan
- Produced by: Florence Ang; Gerald Herman; Ricardo Uncilla
- Starring: Lim Yu-Beng; Loo Zihan; Goh Guat Kian
- Cinematography: Loo Zihan; Kan Lume
- Edited by: Kan Lume; Loo Zihan; Meghan Kan
- Music by: Darren Ng
- Production company: Red Dawn Productions
- Release date: October 2007 (BIFF)
- Running time: 71 minutes
- Country: Singapore

Solos is a 2007 Singaporean drama film directed by Kan Lume and Loo Zihan, written by Loo, and starring Lim Yu-Beng, Loo, and Goh Guat Kian. It is based on a 2005 short film by Kan and Loo. The film features no dialogue and recounts the relationships between a boy (Loo), his mother (Goh), and his older lover (Lim).

Singapore's first gay feature film, Solos premiered at the Busan International Film Festival after being pulled from the Singapore International Film Festival due to censorship-related reasons.

== Plot ==
A boy carries on an illicit affair with his schoolteacher while becoming more distanced from his mother. As the boy and his older lover also become more distanced over time, the boy breaks off the relationship, and his lover becomes distraught.

== Cast ==
- Lim Yu-Beng as Man
- Loo Zihan as Boy
- Goh Guat Kian as Mother

== Production ==
The film was loosely based on co-director Loo's experiences. Loo had been in a relationship with an older man while he was a teenager. The relationship ended after Loo grew in a different direction compared to his lover.

Loo said that Singapore's anti-gay laws were not a major concern during filming, as other illegal behavior is regularly depicted in film. The film as a whole is based on Untitled (2005), a short film by Loo and Kan.

== Release ==
Solos was intended to premiere at the Singapore International Film Festival. After the Singaporean government cut the film, it was pulled from competition and given a jury-only screening. It premiered instead at the Busan International Film Festival.

== Reception ==
Robert Koehler of Variety wrote, "The film's achievement lies in its ability to imply complex entanglements and shifting emotional states without a shred of language." Maggie Lee of The Hollywood Reporter compared it to a student film that overuses technique. Twitch Film called it "a worthy addition" to Singapore's cinema.
