= IndigNation =

Annual LGBTQ+ event in Singapore

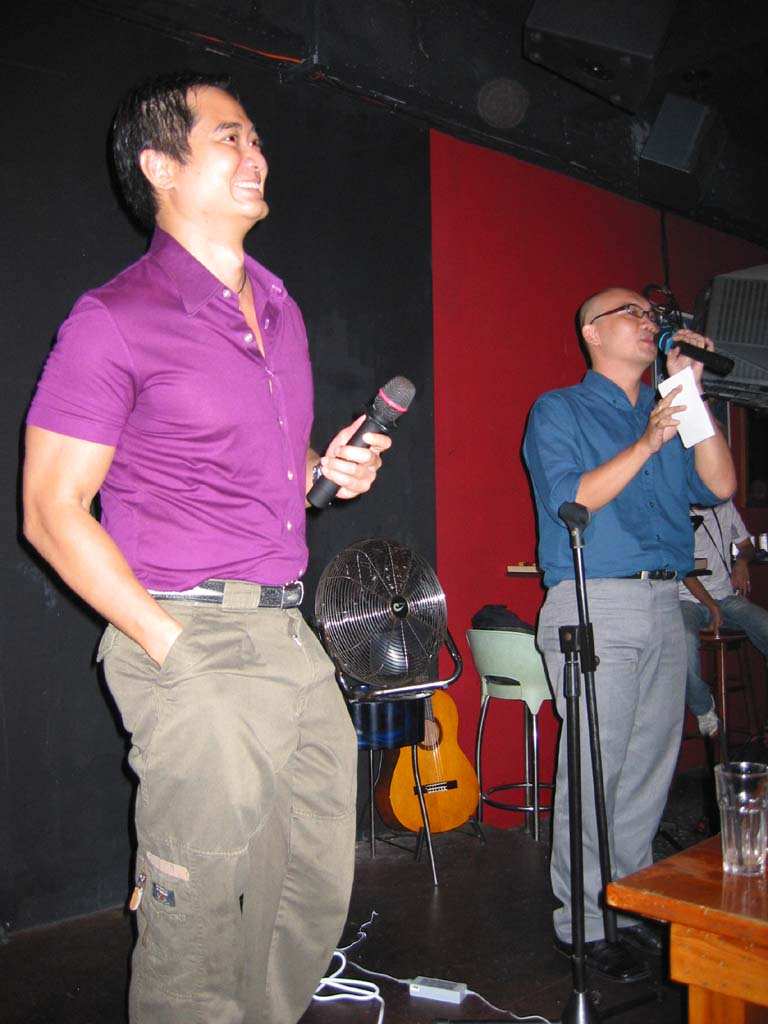
Dr. Tan Chong Kee being introduced by Daniel, the chairman of the lecture "Same-sex Love in Classical Chinese Literature".

IndigNation is Singapore's annual, month-long lesbian, gay, bisexual, and queer pride season, first held in August 2005 to coincide with the republic's 40th National Day.

== Background ==
IndigNation begun as a series of LGBT-themed events meant to fill in the gap that Singapore's banning of the Nation parties created. With the promise that Prime Minister Lee Hsien Loong made in August 2004, allowing indoor talks to proceed ahead without a license from the police, it was an ideal time to organize talks, workshops, and related events as part of the line-up for IndigNation.

=== Fundraising efforts ===
Fridae.com, Asia's largest gay and lesbian portal, has supported the festival since its inception through media and financial sponsorship through its Fridae Community Development Fund and fundraising events.

In May 2008, a gala screening of Wilde, a biographical film about Irish-born playwright Oscar Wilde, raised S$10,000 for Indignation and provided a seed fund to establish the Rascals Prize, a biennial award for the best research work related to the subject of LGBT and Singapore. In 2009, the fundraising gala premiere of Milk, a biopic about America's first openly gay, publicly elected politician Harvey Milk, raised S$14,000 for Indignation, Pinkdot Singapore and gay filmmaker Loo Zihan's new film project. In the same year, the fundraising gala premiere of Ang Lee’s Taking Woodstock raised S$6,000 for Indignation and other LGBT-related community projects in Singapore.
