= Josef Ng =

Singaporean gallerist and performance artist

- Born: Josef Ng Sing Chor; 1972 (age 53–54)
- Known for: Performance art
- Notable work: Brother Cane (1994)

Josef Ng Sing Chor (Chinese: 吴承祖; pinyin: Wú Chéngzǔ; born 1972) is a Singaporean gallerist and former performance artist. He is known for his 1994 public performance Brother Cane, at the end of which he partially exposed his buttocks and snipped his pubic hair. Brother Cane was reportedly staged in protest of the imprisonment and caning of a group of homosexual men in Singapore the previous year; Ng called his hair-snipping a "symbolic gesture for an artistic purpose". He was handed a lifetime public performance ban by the National Arts Council and fined for violating the Penal Code. Ng later became a curator at various art galleries.

== Career ==
=== Brother Cane ===
In November 1993, twelve men were arrested in a sting operation at Tanjong Rhu, a notable "cruising" location for homosexual men in Singapore. They were all charged with "outraging modesty, using criminal force to molest, and acts of indecency" and subsequently sentenced to prison. In addition, the six men who plead guilty to the charges were given three strokes of the cane.

Around 02:00 local time on 1 January 1994, to conclude the eight-day Artists' General Assembly (AGA) jointly organised by The Artists Village (TAV) and 5th Passage, Ng debuted his 25-minute public performance Brother Cane.

During the 25 to 30 minutes performance Josef Ng dressed in a black robe and briefs around and within a semicircle of tiles each with a news clipping from The Straits Times about an anti-gay operation and a block of tofu with red dye. He read words from the clippings, then performed a rhythmic dance with a rotan, striking the tofu and dye. Ng mentioned hair clipping as silent protest, and proceeded to turn his back to the audience and faced a wall. He then lowered his briefs and carried out an action hidden from the view of the audience. He returned to the performance space and placed hair clippings on a tile. Following that, he requested a cigarette, took a few puffs, and stubbed it on his arm, stating that silent protest is sometimes insufficient. At the end, Ng thanked the audience, donned his robe, and received applause. He asked for help in cleaning up the tofu pieces, and received assistance from the audience. At no point did Ng expose himself, and no one saw him cut his hair; the audience only saw the hair when he placed it on a tile.

Through Brother Cane, which was staged at 5th Passage's private office and studio space in Parkway Parade, he allegedly hoped to "protest the use of entrapment by the Singapore police and the caning of gay men caught cruising." Dressed in "a long black robe and black briefs", Ng arranged twelve tiles in a semi-circle in front of him, on which news clippings of the Tanjong Rhu incident were placed. A block of tofu and a bag of red paint were also placed on each tile. Before striking the tofu blocks and paint bags with a cane, Ng remarked, "I will give them three strokes of the cane."

During the denouement, with his back turned to the audience who were seated 10–15 metres (33–49 ft) away, Ng partially exposed his buttocks and snipped off a clump of his pubic hair, which he then placed on the central tile. As he puffed on a cigarette that had been handed to him by an audience member, Ng declared, "Sometimes silent protest is not enough."

Ng was arrested on the same day and charged with violating the Penal Code by performing an "obscene" act. The National Arts Council (NAC) condemned both Ng and fellow AGA performer Shannon Tham, who had vomited into a bucket as part of his act: "By no stretch of the imagination can such acts be construed and condoned as art." Ng and Tham were consequently banned by the NAC from ever performing in public again. The NAC also announced an indefinite moratorium on funding for forum theatre and performance art; it was only lifted some ten years later, in 2004.

At the time of the offence, Ng was a naval sergeant in the Singapore Armed Forces. Ng himself claimed, "Because I am in the army, I have little hair on my head that can be cut. So I cut off my pubic hair instead." He added that his hair-snipping was a "symbolic gesture for an artistic purpose", and was not intended to "shock people or to be offensive".

The Parkway Parade management team had already warned 5th Passage in January 1993, after performance artist Vincent Leow publicly consumed his own urine at its premises. Nonetheless, even after the expiry of their rent-free tenancy agreement in March 1993, the group had been allowed to continue its activities at the shopping mall. Following Ng's performance, however, the group was ordered to leave Parkway Parade.

On 22 January 1994, the Ministry of Home Affairs and the Ministry of Information and the Arts opined in a joint statement that "new art forms such as performance art ... pose dangers to public order, security and decency, and much greater difficulty to the licensing authority." Minister for Information and the Arts George Yeo added, "We do not want artistic license to degenerate into pornography." Ng declined to stand trial and pleaded guilty to his charges on 16 May 1994. He was fined S$1,000.

Ng's prosecution was negatively received by members of the local performing arts community. Singaporean diplomat and lawyer Tommy Koh, who was the NAC's chairperson from 1991 to 1996, conceded that "no one from NAC witnessed Josef Ng's performance." However, he also claimed that "I could not ... defend Josef Ng from the wrath of some ultra-conservative elements in the government."

Brother Cane was restaged by Singaporean actor and filmmaker Loo Zihan, whose one-night-only performance Cane was held at The Substation Theatre in February 2012. However, while Ng's performance was unscripted, Loo had to submit a script to the Media Development Authority (MDA) in order for Cane to be approved for public viewing. Additionally, in view of the National Environment Agency's guidelines on indoor smoking, Loo decided to replicate Ng's cigarette-smoking in the theatre's outdoor smoking corner.

=== Post-Brother Cane ===
Ng was involved in the August and September 1999 The Necessary Stage production BrainStorm (what's that in your head?), which was held at the Singapore Art Museum and comprised 16 unique installations and performances that were altogether two hours long. Ng's piece (a collaboration with Green Zeng titled "Picture the Mirroring") involved numerous television screens that showed Ng brushing his teeth, shaving, and washing.

Ng subsequently left Singapore and variously lived and worked in China, Thailand, and Japan. From 2006 to 2011, Ng served as the artistic and executive director of Chinese art gallery Tang Contemporary Art. In 2013, he succeeded Mathieu Borysevicz as the director of the Shanghai Gallery of Art. In 2016, Ng became the managing director of Pearl Lam Galleries' Asian operations.
