= Confessions page =

Community pages on social networking services

Confessions pages are pages on social networking websites (such as Facebook etc), or stand alone website pages which are generally used at schools and universities for students to anonymously post their confessions and secrets to their respective communities. Confessions, statements acknowledging personal facts that someone would prefer to not be shared under their true identity, are sent to the administrators of the page through online form services such as SurveyMonkey and Google Forms or submission portals created with purpose-built tools. The administrators then decide which confessions to post on the page.

Confessions pages act as a medium for students to express their emotions, beliefs, and troubles anonymously with their community. Confessions pages can also be a de facto message board where students can ask for help regarding issues about schoolwork and affairs. Confessions pages are becoming very popular among not only universities but also high schools. For instance, Boulder High School, in Colorado, was reported to have a page. Students feel comfortable on revealing their thoughts on confessions pages due to the complete anonymity of their posts. However, due to the anonymity, the pages sometimes have to be reviewed by their creators as some users may post about sensitive topics that may be related to race or sexual orientation, as well as political and religious content.

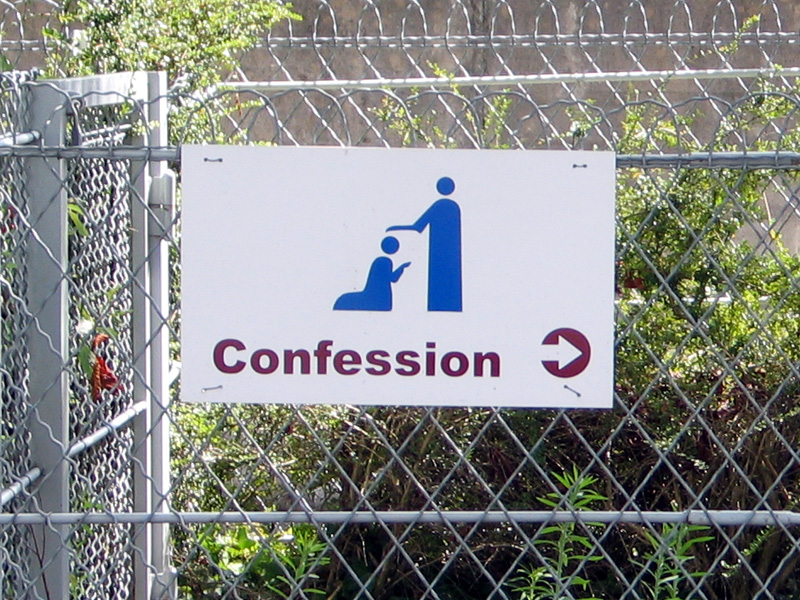
Confessions

== History and overview ==
Anonymous confession pages went viral on the internet in 2012 after a page was created on Facebook called OMG Confessions, which was originally restricted to Facebook members 18 and over. However, the trend has since been spreading all over the world. College students in India, America and Great Britain are beginning to utilize online confession pages, too. One student told Buzzfeed, “Everyone posts so much about themselves. It is sort of disturbing, borderline creepy, but sickly entertaining.” Facebook pages for confessions began surfacing for college campuses large and small all around the United States. High schools have also had these confession pages appear, but some have been shut down due to cyberbullying. However, the commentators on these confessions can serve as a support system, offering advice for confessors coping with depression or other issues. However, this is not always the case. At the high school level, the police asked Facebook to shut down two confession pages due to hatefully and sexually explicit content. At the university level, the concern for school administrators is not bullying but brand protection. According to The New York Times, campus administrators are worried that “outsiders will mistake these raunchy independent pages — with their school logos and landmark buildings — for sanctioned reflections of campus life.” Some universities including San Francisco State have asked their school's confession pages to discontinue the use of their school logos, photos, and iconic buildings. Universities do not want outsiders to attribute the negative discussions on confession pages to an actual depiction of their school and campus life.

Since these confession pages are anonymous, it may bedifficult for parents and school administrators to completely shut them down. They can report these pages to the website administrators, but unless the pages violate the site’s terms of services, they may potentially not be shut down. For example, Facebook policy is attributed to state “These pages, just as every other page on Facebook, are still completely accountable to our terms. If the content violates [the terms] we will remove it and in some cases remove the page entirely. We maintain a robust reporting infrastructure to keep an eye out for offensive or potentially dangerous content. This reporting infrastructure includes a trained team of reviewers who respond to reports and escalate them to law enforcement as needed.” Even if a page is shut down, another person may easily create another confessions page. Students that set up these pages must use their real identity when creating the page, but can conceal their identity when managing it. Facebook does routinely review pages and responds to complaints about the content removing inappropriate posts or, if necessary, shutting down the page completely.

== Online Anonymous Confession Platforms ==
Confessions pages, whether on social networking sites like Facebook or as standalone platforms, provide a space for individuals to share anonymous confessions. These pages have gained popularity across schools, universities, and among the general public, enabling users to post their thoughts, experiences, and secrets without revealing their identities. Unlike traditional social media platforms, anonymous confession websites typically do not require any signup, ensuring complete privacy while sharing confessions. Users can browse, read, and comment on others' confessions freely, making it a truly open and engaging space for anyone looking to express themselves anonymously.

The unique features of these platforms, such as the ability to post and interact without creating an account, attract users who seek a private and judgment-free environment. This level of anonymity encourages individuals to share personal matters, whether it's about relationships, mental health struggles, or everyday challenges, knowing that their identities are protected. Additionally, the option to read and comment on confessions without logging in fosters a supportive community where users can offer advice and empathy to one another. As the popularity of these platforms continues to grow, they have evolved to include various interactive features like upvoting and anonymous feedback, allowing users to engage with the content and connect with others' stories more meaningfully. Despite facing challenges in content moderation, anonymous confession pages remain valuable outlets for people looking to share their experiences and seek connection in a secure, anonymous space.

== Confession page content ==
On these confession pages some confessors express their emotions: their excitements, troubles, and fears. Other confession pages are shout outs from secret admires often addressing their crush by their name. Some pages describe sexcapades – oftentimes with too much detail. Despite, the mostly negative gossip common on confessions pages, the anonymity of some pages can provide a safe space for people to talk and share their problems. There are some pages where people talk about their eating disorders, their thoughts of suicide, depression, or other struggles. The confessions on these pages are mostly met with support, encouragement, and advice. Some confessions aren't really confessions at all, many are just questions, funny movie quotes, or inside jokes about the institution.

While these pages have a lot of positive content it is difficult to have a public site on the internet without having negative content as well. Some negative content includes bullying classmates, posting offensive material, and other inappropriate content that tends to get out of hand.

== Recent popularity ==
Over the last couple years, many schools have started their own "Confessions Pages" as their students feel that it is an interesting way to share their thoughts. It has become a way for students to state ideas that they normally wouldn't if the service was not anonymous. For instance, one student stated, "I'm in love with my girlfriend but I cheated on her to even the playing field in case she ever cheats on me”. Another student stated, "“To the guy, with the mohawk/fohawk in Intro to Eng, you're cute. i want you, im afraid to talk to you”. Also, these pages sometimes lead to individuals meeting up in person after posting on the service. For example, when students discover that another person thinks they are attractive, they feel the urge to find out who the person is and eventually meet up with them.

While these confessions pages not only help students find others interested in them, they also help students find entertainment and a friend within their larger community. These pages provide stories that many students can relate to without feeling the pressure of revealing what is personal to them. A student from the University of Arizona who has created her own confessions page stated "There's a lot of people who submit things about problems they're going through, they need a friend or someone to talk to. There are so many people who will reach out to them and say, 'Here's my number' or 'Message me.'" The same student also states "The fact is, whether big or small, every single one of us has or is currently facing some kind of hardship, and we don't always have someone or know who to talk to." Some students come to these pages for a safe place to share their feelings and problems.

== Problems ==
As confession pages have gained popularity in the recent years, problems have arisen regarding the anonymity of posts in these groups. Cyber bullying has been made easier through these groups, in which bullies can post vicious remarks without putting their name in harms way. Confession page bullying has even spread to other nations. An anonymous student in Karachi, Pakistan laments that confession pages, "degrade people and make them feel unnecessarily bad about themselves". One major problem with confession pages is that they are open to everyone, permitting family members or relatives to find private comments about their son or daughter that they did not want them to see. Students have become harsher in their posts, including the names of other students, teachers, or even parents in an effort to inflict as much pain as possible.

Parents and teachers are not the only people who become involved in these confession pages. When the safety of others is put at risk through these pages the police are bound to be involved. For example, threats such bringing weapons to school or relationships between students and teachers force the police and higher authorities within these colleges or high schools to get involved. For example, Forest Hills High school in New York City needed police to search the school after students finding an alarming threat on the page. Since then, the page has been shut down and cellphones with access to these pages have been banned from the school. Another example came from Boise, Idaho where students used their confession page "to allege a sexual relationship between teacher and student." Confession pages can be dangerous not only for students, but for teachers and parents as well.

In addition, depressed students have been known to post about suicidal thoughts anonymously, which makes it difficult to get them the help they need. For instance, in Naperville, Illinois, after a rise in both suicidal and harmful posts, their confession page is threatening to shut down because it "was meant to be a little more light-hearted and fun, but there has to be a line drawn as to what will be posted and what won’t".

Not only are these pages providing and causing social issues for students, they are also becoming a significant source of distraction. For example, a student in South Asia states, “Confession pages are distracting. I log onto Facebook every two minutes only to read these hilarious confessions.” These distractions have been making it more difficult for students to focus on their academics both inside and outside the classroom. Due to the growing trend of posting hateful posts on these pages, a professor at KC College in India believes that legal measures can be taken to stop students from posting about sensitive topics that may hurt others. He states, "Such actions have the potential to end up on the wrong side of the law, especially the IT Act." He is pushing for students to not cross the line between having fun and hurting the feelings of others.

In the United States, schools are pushing towards the removal of Confessions Pages from social networks. Because students continually post about destructive actions, school administrators feel that the posts can be detrimental to the school community. For example, in the Lakehead District, the school board strongly believes that "the posts could be harmful to students, teachers and staff, and added there's no way to tell if allegations are true — or not — because they are posted anonymously." Many school officials are also striving to educate users of social networks about the differences between appropriate and inappropriate actions on such sites. One school director states, "The solution shouldn't be just blocking content," he said. "It should be a complex solution involved in educating social media users about what's appropriate, as opposed to what's not."

Because of all of the problems associated with confessions pages, the administrators of Confession pages have set up rules and regulations of what is permissible to post.
