= Alfian Sa'at =

Singaporean playwright, poet, and writer (born 1977)

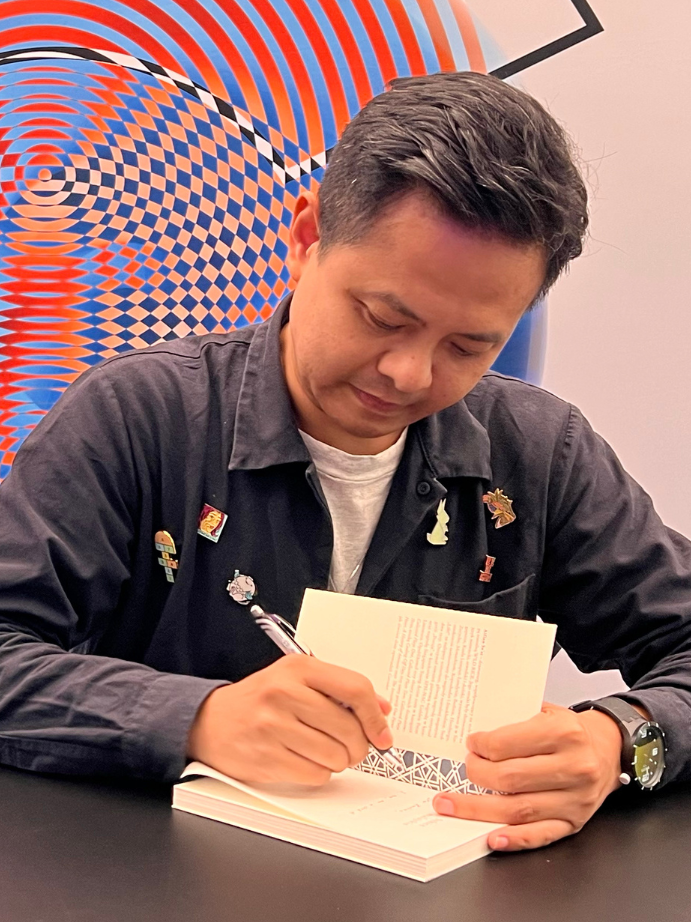
- Alfian at the 2022 Conrad Festival
- Born: Alfian bin Sa'at; 18 July 1977 (age 49); Singapore
- Occupations: Playwright, poet, writer, translator

Alfian bin Sa'at (born 18 July 1977), better known as Alfian Sa'at, is a Singaporean playwright, poet, and writer. He is known for penning a body of English- and Malay-language plays, poems, and prose exploring race, sexuality, and politics, topics considered provocative in Singapore. Alfian has also translated Malay-language novels by Malay Singaporean writers to English. Alfian has received a number of national literature awards, such as the 2001 Young Artist Award and three Life! Theatre Awards for Best Original Script. Alfian is the resident playwright of theatre group W!LD RICE.

== Early life ==
Born in Singapore in 1977, Alfian is a Malay-Muslim of Minang, Javanese, and Hakka descent. Alfian is an alumnus of Tampines Primary School, Raffles Institution (RI), and Raffles Junior College (RJC), where he served as chairman of the drama societies in RI and subsequently in RJC. He took part in the National University of Singapore's Creative Arts Programme—an annual creative writing programme for secondary and junior college students—twice under the mentorship of Singaporean playwright Haresh Sharma, first at the age of fifteen, and a second time at seventeen. During his two years at RJC, Alfian received the Kripalani Award for Outstanding Contribution to Creative Arts. Alfian was a medical undergraduate at the National University of Singapore but did not graduate.

== Career ==
In 1998, Alfian published his first collection of poetry, One Fierce Hour, which was described by poet Lee Tzu Pheng in The Straits Times as an "exciting, landmark collection." Alfian was described by Malaysia's New Straits Times as "one of the most acclaimed poets in his country... a prankish provocateur, libertarian hipster". A year later in 1999, Alfian published his first collection of short stories, Corridor, which won the Singapore Literature Prize Commendation Award. Seven of the short stories from the collection were adapted for television. In 2001, he published A History of Amnesia, his second collection of poetry, which was shortlisted for a Kiriyama Asia-Pacific Book Prize. The same year, Alfian won both the inaugural National Arts Council-Singapore Press Holdings Golden Point Award for Poetry, as well as the National Arts Council's Young Artist Award for Literature.

Alfian's plays have been translated into German and Swedish, and have been read and performed in London, Zurich, Stockholm, Berlin, Hamburg and Munich. He has worked as a playwright with theatre group The Necessary Stage as well as the Malay theatre group Teater Ekamatra. Alfian is currently the resident playwright of theatre group W!LD RICE. In 2015, Nadirah was selected by The Business Times as one of the "finest plays in 50 years" alongside productions by Goh Poh Seng, Michael Chiang and Haresh Sharma and others.

In 2016, it was reported that Alfian's co-written play sex.violence.blood.gore and his short story collection Malay Sketches was included on a reading list at the School of Oriental and African Studies, University of London, while the University of York and West Virginia University has his poem "Singapore You Are Not My Country" and selected poems on their reading lists respectively. In particular, the University of York's Dr Claire Chambers noted that this was because Alfian "introduces non-Anglophone words and concepts, and puts together words in an expressive portmanteau style".

== Works ==
=== Plays ===
English

- Fighting (1994)
- Black Boards, White Walls (1997)
- Yesterday My Classmate Died (1997)
- sex.violence.blood.gore (co-written with Chong Tze Chien) (1999)
- Asian Boys Vol. 1 (loosely adapted from August Strindberg's A Dream Play) (2000)
- What's The Difference? (2001)
- Don't Say I Say (2001)
- poppy dot dream (2001)
- The Corrected Poems of Minah Jambu (2001)
- The Optic Trilogy (2001)
- 7 Ten: Seven Original 10-minute Plays: Not In (2003)
- Landmarks: Asian Boys Vol. 2 (2004)
- Tekka Voices (2004)
- Mengapa Isa? (2004)
- The Importance of Being Kaypoh (2005)
- Harmony Daze (2005)
- Confessions of 300 Unmarried Men: Blush (2006)
- Homesick (2006)
- Happy Endings: Asian Boys Vol 3 (2007)
- Snow White and the Seven Dwarfs (2008)
- Beauty And The Beast (2009)
- Cooling Off Day (2011)
- Cook a Pot of Curry (2013)
- Monkey Goes West (2014)
- Hotel (2015)
- Tiger of Malaya (2018)

Malay

- Deklamasi Malas (Declamation of Indolence) (1997)
- Dongeng (Myth) (1997)
- Anak Bulan di Kampung Wa' Hassan (The New Moon at Kampung Wa' Hassan) (1998)
- Madu II (Polygamy) (1998)
- Causeway (1998)
- Peti Kayu Ibuku (My Mother's Wooden Chest) (translated into Malay from Kuo Pao Kun's translation of Ng Xin Yue's original Mandarin text) (1999)
- The Miseducation of Minah Bukit (2001)
- Tapak 7 (Seven Steps) (2001)
- Selamat Malam Ibu (adapted from Night Mother by Marsha Norman) (2003)
- Keturunan Laksmana Tak Ada Anu (adapted from Descendants of the Eunuch Admiral by Kuo Pao Kun) (2003)
- Minah & Monyet (Minah & Monkey) (2003)
- Nadirah (2009)
- Pariah (alternatively staged as Parah) (2011)
- Kakak Kau Punya Laki (Your Sister's Husband) (2013)
- GRC (Geng Rebut Cabinet) (2015)

Mandarin

- Fugitives (失控) (co-written with Ng How Wee) (2002)

=== Prose ===
English

- Corridor (SNP, 1999; Ethos Books, 2015) ISBN 981-4032-40-9 ISBN 9789810779931
- Malay Sketches (Ethos Books, 2012) ISBN 978-981-07-1801-5

Malay

- Bisik: Antologi Drama Melayu Singapura (Whisper: Anthology of Malay Singaporean Drama) (Pustaka Cipta, 2003)

=== Poetry ===
- One Fierce Hour (Landmark Books, 1998) ISBN 981-3065-18-4
- A History of Amnesia (Ethos Books, 2001) ISBN 981-04-3704-8
- The Invisible Manuscript (Math Paper Press, 2012) ISBN 9789810739492

== Works featuring Sa'at ==
- "Nadira" in Southeast Asian Plays (Supernova Books, 2017) ISBN 978-1-906582-86-9

== Awards ==
- 1995 – Kripalani Award for Outstanding Contribution to Creative Arts
- 1998 – Commendation Award by the Malay Language Council for Causeway
- 1999 – Singapore Literature Prize Commendation Award for Corridor
- 2001 – Golden Point Award for Poetry
- 2001 – Young Artist Award for Literature
- 2005 – Life! Theatre Awards for Best Original Script for Landmarks: Asian Boys Vol. 2
- 2006 – FRONT Award
- 2010 – Life! Theatre Awards for Best Original Script for Nadirah
- 2014 – Life! Theatre Awards for Best Original Script for Kakak Kau Punya Laki (Your Sister's Husband)
