= Alvin Tan (director) =

Singaporean theatre director

- Born: Asia
- Occupation: Theatre director

Alvin Tan is the founder The Necessary Stage (TNS), for which he was artistic director from 1987 to 2026, and the co-artistic director of the M1 Singapore Fringe Festival. Under Tan's leadership, TNS has grown from a small society in 1987 to one of Singapore’s most prominent and respected theatre companies. He also initiated the Company's Theatre For Youth Branch and the Marine Parade Theatre Festival.

He has a Bachelor of Arts from the National University of Singapore, a Diploma in Education from the Institute of Education, and a Master of Arts from the University of Birmingham.

== Career ==
One of the leading proponents of devising theatre in Singapore, Tan has directed more than 40 plays, which have been staged in Singapore, Malaysia, Glasgow, Cairo, Busan, Seoul, Melbourne, Birmingham, London, Dublin, Cairo, New Delhi, Hungary and Romania. Some of these landmark productions include Lanterns Never Go Out, Still Building, Pillars, Galileo, Koan and godeatgod. He was also involved in Diaspora in Scotland, for which he co-directed goteatgod with 7:84, a Scottish theatre company.

In 1997, Tan was awarded a Fulbright Scholarship. The following year, he was conferred the Young Artist Award by the National Arts Council. Tan is also strongly involved in civil society work, representing Singapore in numerous conferences and workshops around the world. Tan was invited to participate in the World Culture Forum Alliance in São Paulo and the Conference of Asian Foundations and Organisations in Barcelona, as well as 2005's World Culture Forum in Jordan.

In December 2005, Tan directed Boxing Day: The Tsunami Project, a response to the tragedy of 2004, as well as Separation 40 with Kuala Lumpur theatre group Dramalab's Zahim Albakri, which won three 2005 BOH Cameronian Arts Awards including Best Director. He co-directed a collaborative project entitled Mobile, a commission of the Singapore Arts Festival 2006 with artists from Japan, the Philippines, Singapore and Thailand that had its world premiere in Singapore in June 2006. Mobile toured to Kuala Lumpur for a three-night run at The Actors Studio in Bangsar, and Japan for several performances in March 2007.

In September 2006, Tan directed a main season production for The Necessary Stage, Fundamentally Happy held at The Necessary Stage Black Box. The play toured to Malaysia for stagings at The Actors Studio in January 2007, before being reprised as part of the M1 Singapore Fringe Festival 2007 at the National Museum Gallery Theatre. The play was adapted into a film in 2015 by directors Tan Bee Thiam and Lei Yuan Bin, starring Adibah Noor.

In 2014, Tan was awarded the Cultural Medallion.
