= LGBTQ pride events in Singapore =

IndigNation, the first public LGBTQ+ pride festival in Singapore, took place in August 2006. A second annual IndigNation was held in August 2007, though it was hampered by difficulties in obtaining permits from the government.

== History ==
=== Before 2001 ===
LGBTQ+ events in Singapore were initially private and discreet, often held indoors on Sunday nights in mainstream discos that targeted the ‘pink dollar’—a strategy employed to boost business during hours of lower patronage from heterosexual customers. Singaporean LGBTQ+ rights activist Roy Tan revealed that the first place in Singapore where men could dance with each other was a seafood restaurant at Punggol Point in Singapore's outskirts which was established in the 1970's. According to him, gay patronage was vital to businesses. This trend spread in the early 1980s when police became more tolerant of male same-sex dancing in discos. However, during quieter moments, venue management would often urge attendees to ‘behave’ to avoid complaints from heterosexual patrons.

By the mid-1980s, an increasing number of gay men attended these discos on Sunday nights, leading to a shift in clientele. Consequently, management became more accepting of same-sex couples engaging in slow dancing and close embraces.

The growing demand for such events prompted venues like Marmota, Niche, Legend, and Studebaker’s to advertise Sundays as ‘men’s night’. However, there was still a demand for events on other nights of the week.

To meet this need, entrepreneurs like Max Lim organized private gay events on weekdays at roving locations such as discos at Far East Plaza, along Orchard Road, and nightspots at Clarke Quay. Other gay businessmen soon established discos like Taboo and Why Not in Tanjong Pagar which nightly catered exclusively to a gay clientele.

Expanding beyond indoor venues, Max Lim organized Singapore’s first private open-air LGBTQ+ gatherings, advertised by leaflets and word of mouth, at locations such as East Coast Lagoon and Big Splash. These events were popular, offering attendees space to roam, eat, drink, dance, and interact. Being private, however, kept them out of the mainstream community and media’s scope, limiting their reach.

Law enforcement's tolerance of LGBTQ+ spaces during the 1980s changed in the early 1990s with its efforts to entrap and arrest gay cruisers, bringing challenges to Singapore's LGBTQ+ scene.

=== Nation ===
==== Nation ====
Scientist and entrepreneur Dr. Stuart Koe established the English-language Web Portal, Fridae.com, in 2000 and used it to organize Singapore's first private, widely advertised LGBTQ+ pride event. He obtained police approval of and corporate sponsorship for the party, which was held on 8 August 2001, one day before National Day, for which it was named.

It was held at Sentosa's Fantasy Island. Attendees traveled from Sydney, Malaysia, the United States, and Hong Kong. The venue was divided into 3 zones: the Centro Boyz zone with its Miss Devastating drag competition, the Womyn's zone which barred men most of the evening, and the Chill Out area where guests could mingle among selling food, drinks, toys, and flyers. Eight to ten uniformed police officers visited around 11:30 p.m. to check on the event and left without incident after 15 minutes. The local safe-sex group Action for AIDS (AFA) received a portion of ticket sales.

==== Nation.02 ====
More than 2,500 people gathered at the Fountain Gardens and Musical Fountain in Sentosa on Saturday, 9 August 2002, for Singapore's 37th birthday and the 2nd Nation party. Partygoers had a choice of two dance areas, a laser show, and visual effects. Attendance by regional visitors was higher than the previous year, drawing nearly 500 partygoers mainly from Hong Kong, Thailand, and Taiwan.

==== Nation.03 ====
Fridae Newsletter's Nation.03 event at Sentosa expanded to become a 3-day event in 2003, attracting an estimated 4,500 attendees who celebrated Singapore's 38th National Day.

==== Nation.04 ====
Nation.04 featured visual effects, venues, and international circuit DJs from Taiwan, Japan, Australia, USA, and Singapore. The event was the largest in the series, attracting more than 8,000 attendees, 40% of whom were international visitors.

=== Nation.05 (2005) ===
In April 2005, the Licensing Division of the Singapore Police rejected Fridae Newsletter's application to hold Nation.05 Dr. Stuart Koe expressed disappointment at the position of the officials.

Unable to hold the event in Singapore, Fridae Newsletter changed the venue to Phuket, Thailand.

=== Snowball parties ===
==== SnowBall.04 ban ====
In early December 2004, the Public Entertainment Licensing Unit (PELU) of the police rejected an application for a public entertainment license to hold SnowBall.04 on 26 December 2004.

It was the first time that a PELU license had been denied. Organizer Jungle Media, a subsidiary of Singapore-based Fridae.com, had previously obtained licenses for similar past events, like the Snowball event in December 2002 and 2003, Nation (August 2002, 2003, 2004), Squirt (April 2004), Boys of Summer (June 2003), and Paradise Ball (December 2003).

Despite Nation.04 having been nominated for "Best Event Experience" in the 2005 Singapore Tourism Awards, the Police stated that, as a gay event, it offered no public benefit.

In a press statement, the Police said the following were taken into consideration:

The promotion materials were widely advertised on Fridae.com, a known gay portal;

Observations during the indoor Opening Ball at Suntec showed that patrons of the same gender were seen openly kissing and intimately touching each other. Some of the revellers were cross-dressed, for example, males wearing skirts. Patrons were also seen using the toilets of the opposite sex. The behavior of these patrons suggested that most of them were probably gays/lesbians, and this was thus an event almost exclusively for gays/lesbians;

A number of couples of the same sex were seen hugging and kissing in public after the event while waiting for taxis and checking into nearby hotels after the party.

Several letters of complaint were received from some patrons about the openly gay acts at the Ball. The report further stated:

The Police recognize that there are some Singaporeans with gay tendencies. While the Police do not discriminate against them on this basis, the Police also recognize that Singapore is still, by and large, a conservative and traditional society. Hence, the Police cannot approve any application for an event that goes against the moral values of a large majority of Singaporeans. Future applications for events of similar nature will be closely scrutinized.

=== IndigNation Festival ===
IndigNation
- Genre: Electronic dance music
- Location: Singapore
- Years active: 2005-2006, etc.
- Website: IndigNation

Singapore's first public LGBTQ+ pride festival, IndigNation, took place in August 2005, with a second annual IndigNation in August 2006.

== See also ==
- Pink Dot SG
- List of electronic music festivals
- Circuit party
