= Haresh Sharma =

Singaporean playwright (born 1965)

- Born: 1965 (age 60–61); Singapore
- Occupations: Resident playwright and artistic director for The Necessary Stage
- Writing career
- Notable works: Off Centre, Model Citizens, Those Who Can't, Teach
- Notable awards: Singapore Literature Prize (Merit, 1993), Young Artist Award (1997), S.E.A. Write Award (2014), Singapore Cultural Medallion (2015)

Haresh Sharma (born 1965) is a Singaporean playwright and artistic director of The Necessary Stage. He has written more than 100 plays staged around the world. Sharma has a BA from the National University of Singapore as well as an MA in Playwriting from the University of Birmingham, obtained in 1994 on a Shell-NAC Scholarship.

Sharma has also been awarded fellowships and grants by the British Council and the United States Information Service, and was conferred the Young Artist Award in 1997. His play, Still Building, was awarded a Merit Singapore Literature Prize in 1993 while Off Centre was selected by the Ministry of Education as a Literature text for 'N’ and 'O’ levels, and republished by The Necessary Stage in 2006. In 2014, Sharma was awarded the prestigious S.E.A. Write Award. In 2015, he was awarded the Cultural Medallion.

== Early life and education ==
Born in Malaya, Sharma attended Tanjong Katong Secondary School, Temasek Junior College, as well as the National University of Singapore (NUS), where he majored in English Language and Literature. It was also at the National University of Singapore in 1987 where he met Alvin Tan, then a fellow undergraduate and founder of The Necessary Stage. He soon became involved in productions – first doing backstage, publicity, sound, and the occasional acting – then eventually moving on to scriptwriting when one of his plays won the NUS-Shell Short Play Competition in 1988. He became a naturalised Singaporean after Singapore's first national day on 9 August 1965.

== Career ==
In 1990, after graduation from NUS, Sharma became the resident playwright of The Necessary Stage (TNS).

In 1991, Sharma wrote his ninth play, This Chord and Others, which was put into production by TNS. Sharma also made his first performance in the play, acting as Sukdev.

In August 2007, a new volume of Interlogue: Studies in Singapore Literature, was published with a focus on the works of Sharma. Interlogue is a series published by Ethos Books and edited by A/P Kirpal Singh that aims to bring critical focus on the works of Singapore writers in English. Previous editions of the series included one each on fiction, poetry, drama and interviews with local writers, as well as one dedicated volume on Singapore playwright Robert Yeo. The publication, written by Prof David Birch and edited by A/P Kirpal Singh, was an extensive investigation into Sharma's development as a writer; the themes and issues he grapples with; as well as his vision and practice of theatre within and outside his work at The Necessary Stage. While Interlogue itself was not published by The Necessary Stage, the company assisted with the provision of archival material for Prof Birch's research.

In 2010, The Necessary Stage published a new anthology of Haresh's plays entitled Trilogy, including the scripts and production notes of three award-winning works, Fundamentally Happy, Good People and Gemuk Girls. The script of Those Who Can't, Teach, which was restaged as part of the 2010 Singapore Arts Festival, was published by Epigram Books. In 2011, a collection of early short plays by Haresh Sharma entitled Shorts I was published by The Necessary Stage. In 2012, two collections of Sharma's scripts were published, one entitled Shorts 2, and the other entitled Plays for Schools. This was followed by the publication of a new collection of Sharma's plays on medical-related issues entitled Don't Forget to Remember Me in 2013, launched at the Singapore Writers Festival. In 2014, Sharma's play Best Of (staged four times to rave reviews in Singapore and Malaysia) and Eclipse (staged in both Singapore and Scotland) were published.

Sharma also wrote the lyrics to Singapore's National Day Parade 2011's withdrawn "Fun Pack Song", which modified the lyrics of Lady Gaga's 'Bad Romance' to widespread criticism and was subsequently withdrawn from the national day parade.

In 2015, Fundamentally Happy was selected by The Business Times as one of the "finest plays in 50 years" alongside productions by Goh Poh Seng, Michael Chiang and Alfian Sa'at and others.

In 2026, Sharma was appointed the artistic director of The Necessary Stage.

== Selected Plays ==
- 1989: Lanterns Never Go Out
- 1990: Those Who Can't, Teach
- 1993: Off Centre
- 1993: Waiting
- 1994: Three Years in the Life and Death of Land
- 1995: Top of the World
- 1995: Rosnah
- 1997: One Day at a Time
- 1998: Pillars
- 1998: Walking into Doors
- 1999: Completely With/Out Character
- 1999: The Exodus
- 2000: History, Whose Story?
- 2000: Untitled (Women Number One)
- 2001: One Hundred Years in Waiting (co-writer)
- 2001: Ah Boy and the Beanstalk
- 2001: Untitled (Cow Number One)
- 2002: godeatgod
- 2003: Revelations
- 2003: Koan
- 2003: Hamlet
- 2004: Such Sweet Sorrow
- 2004: Mardi Gras, Top & Bottom
- 2005: What Big Bombs You Have!!!
- 2005: Boxing Day
- 2006: Mobile
- 2006: Fundamentally Happy
- 2006: Divine Soap
- 2007: Survivor Singapore
- 2008: Gemuk Girls
- 2008: Eclipse
- 2010: Model Citizens
- 2013: Best Of
- 2014: Poor Thing
- 2014: Gitanjali [I feel the earth move]
- 2015: Pioneer (Girls) Generation
- 2019: Cluster Fish

== Publications ==
- Still Building (1994, EPB Publishers) ISBN 997100495X
- This Chord and Others (1999, Minerva Press) ISBN 0754101274
- Koan (2003, The Necessary Stage)
- Lanterns (2003, The Necessary Stage)
- Mardi Gras (2004, The Necessary Stage)
- Off Centre (2006, The Necessary Stage; 2010, Ethos Books) ISBN 9810560397 ISBN 9810430159
- Fundamentally Happy (2006, The Necessary Stage)
- Good People (2007, The Necessary Stage)
- Shorts 1 (2010, The Necessary Stage) ISBN 9789810876746
- Those Who Can't, Teach (2010, Epigram Books) ISBN 9789810855109
- Trilogy (2010, The Necessary Stage) ISBN 9789810848040
- 哈里斯·沙玛剧作选 (2010, 八方文化创作室) ISBN 9789814293983
- Shorts 2 (2011, The Necessary Stage) ISBN 9789810895501
- Model Citizens (2012, Epigram Books) ISBN 9789810714611
- Plays for Schools (2012, The Necessary Stage) ISBN 9789810729134
- Don't Forget to Remember Me (2013, The Necessary Stage) ISBN 9789810771096
- Best Of (2014, The Necessary Stage) ISBN 9789810900144
- Eclipse (2014, The Necessary Stage) ISBN 9789810915346
