= M1 Singapore Fringe Festival =

Fringe theatre festival in Singapore

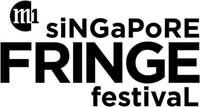
- Frequency: Annual
- Country: Singapore
- Attendance: nearly 14,000 (2014)
- Website: singaporefringe.com

The Singapore Fringe Festival (previously known as the M1 Singapore Fringe Festival) is an annual fringe theatre festival in Singapore. In additional to theatrical performances, it hosts art installations, live music, and a forum. Previously sponsored by M1, it is organised by The Necessary Stage (TNS), a non-profit theatre company.

== History ==
The festival started as the Youth Explosion! in 1997. After M1's donation, the festival was renamed M1 Youth Connection in 1998 and then M1 Theatre Connect in 2004. As title donor, M1 sponsored $100,000 for every edition.

In 2014, the tenth festival had a higher attendance than any previous edition. It was after this festival that TNS instituted a policy of appointing a new artistic director every three years to realise their vision for the festival, while building relationships with artists and curators.

On 30 October 2024, it was announced that M1 would sponsor the festival till its 2025 edition, ending 21 years of sponsorship. In response, TNS launched a successful crowdfunding campaign to secure S$50,000 out of its own estimated cost of S$230,000 to stage an equally-sized festival in 2026.

== Themes ==
The festival occurs each January with a different theme.

- 2014 - Art and the People
- 2015 - Art & Loss
- 2016 - Art & the Animal
- 2017 - Art & Skin
- 2018 - Let's Walk
- 2019 - Still Waters
- 2020 - My Country And My People
- 2021 - Quiet Riot
- 2022 - The Helpers
- 2023 - No specified theme
- 2024 - No specified theme
