= The Necessary Stage =

Theatre company in Singapore

The Necessary Stage (TNS, previously known as M1 Theatre Connect and M1 Youth Connection) is a Singaporean non-profit theatre company with charity status. Founded in 1987 by theatre director Alvin Tan, TNS was established with its own mission to create challenging, indigenous and innovative theatre that touches the heart and mind. Tan served as its artistic director from 1987 to 2026, when resident playwright Haresh Sharma took over.

TNS has been a recipient of the National Arts Council's Major Company Grant, most recently from 2023 to 2026, and is also the organiser of the annual M1 Singapore Fringe Festival. In 2020, it was announced that TNS would be moving out from its long-time home at Marine Parade Community Building. TNS later moved to a premises in Yi Guang Factory Building.

== Main season ==
For its main season, TNS produces an average of four plays a year at its Black Box and at other venues. These include plays for the Singapore Arts Festival. The plays are original, mostly devised pieces created in a collaborative process that is based on research, improvisation before scripting, and input from all members of the production. This process has produced many important works which were not only popular successes but also critically acclaimed, including:

- Boxing Day: The Tsunami Project (2005),
- Top Or Bottom (2004),
- Sing Song (2004),
- koan (2003),
- BOTE: The Beginning Of the End (2002),
- godeatgod (2002 & 2004),
- Close – in my face (2002),
- ABUSE SUXXX!!! (2001),
- Completely With/Out Character (1999),
- Pillars (1998),
- Rosnah (1995, 1996, 1997 & 2006),
- Off Centre (1993 & 2007)
- Fundamentally Happy (2006 & 2007),
- Still Building (1993)
- Good People (2007)
- Gemuk Girls (2008 & 2013)
- "_____ Can Change" (2010)
- Those Who Can't, Teach (2010)
- Model Citizens (2010 & 2011)
- Balek Kampong (2011)
- Singapore (2011 & 2012)
- Crossings (2012)
- October (2012)
- Mobile 2: Flat Cities (2013)
- Best Of (2013 & 2014)
- Poor Thing (2014)
- Gitanjali [I feel the earth move] (2014)
- Pioneer (Girls) Generation (2015)

TNS's international collaboration, Separation 40, was produced with Malaysian theatre company Dramalab, and was staged at the Esplanade as part of its Theatre Studio Season, and at Kuala Lumpur Performing Arts Centre.

In June 2006, TNS presented Mobile, a creative collaboration involving talents from Japan, The Philippines, Singapore and Thailand, as part of the Singapore Arts Festival. Mobile also toured to Kuala Lumpur following its world premiere in Singapore for a 3-day run at The Actors Studio in Bangsar, as well as at Setagaya Public Theatres in Tokyo in March 2007.

2007 sees TNS celebrating its 20th anniversary. As part of its celebration, the company staged two works, the first being a seminal piece first staged in 1993, Off Centre. This production was presented at Esplanade Theatre Studio as part of The Studios Season in May 2007 and received accolades and warm responses from the audience and press. The play has been selected by the Ministry of Education (Singapore) as part of the GCE 'O' and 'N' level literature syllabus from 2007 onwards.

In November 2007, TNS presented another a brand new play that dealt with the issue of living, dying and the pain in between. Good People looks at the relationship between 3 people – Miguel, the new Medical Director trying to run a tight ship; Yati, a jaded nurse making the best of a ‘dead-end’ job; and Radha, the terminally-ill patient addicted to marijuana to relieve her pain. Moving, humorous and evocative, Good People looks at urgent contemporary issues through the test of personal relationships. The play received critical acclaim and popular acclaim in Singapore, and travelled to Kuala Lumpur in May 2008. It was nominated in 7 categories of the 2008 Life! Theatre Awards and won the Best Original Script award.

In October/November 2008, TNS staged Gemuk Girls, a bold and darkly humorous look at family politics and the politics of the day. Gemuk Girls was a three-hander, featuring a mother-daughter duo Kartini (a loud and overbearing hippie mother) and Juliana (a straitlaced young woman on the threshold of entering politics). One day, they receive shocking news about Kartini's father who had been arrested and detained in the 1960s. The play dealt with the controversial issue of ex-political detainees and detention without trial, but went beyond the political realm to look at how it impacted personal and family life and history. It received critical acclaim from various presses, and toured to Kuala Lumpur in December 2008. Gemuk Girls also swept the Best Script, Production of the Year and Best Actor (for Najib Soiman's portrayal of the ex-political detainee) at the 2009 Life! Theatre Awards. It was successfully restaged with the original cast in November 2011 with a sold-out run.

October was a main season production staged by TNS in 2012, and it was a re-working of the company's previous work of the same title in 1996. It looks at elderly residents of a precinct undergoing upgrading, and their relationship with one another and a young property agent eager to have them sell their homes.

In 2013, TNS embarked on an exciting intercultural production entitled Mobile 2: Flat Cities. On the cusp of Japan's surrender during World War II, a Japanese general suffers a stroke and is tended to by a Malay gardener. As they spar, having heated debates about the war, the present is revealed: a Japanese man in a relationship with an Indian woman in Kuala Lumpur; his ex-wife coming to grips with an astrologer's predictions; their son, studying in the United States and confronted by his classmates about Japan's past. A multilingual production featuring artists from Singapore, Malaysia and Japan, Mobile II: Flat Cities cast the spotlight on stories of personal, social and universal struggles across Asian cities. It was well received and travelled to Kuala Lumpur for performances after the run in Singapore.

TNS explored the use of social media in theatre through Poor Thing in February 2014, a work that throws the spotlight on road rage in Singapore. The sold-out run of the production received rave reviews from all quarters. In the same year, the company created a challenging new intercultural and interdisciplinary production entitled Gitanjali [I feel the earth move] in September 2014.

Most recently in 2015, TNS presented Pioneer (Girls) Generation, featuring an intergenerational cast, with a plot revolving around a posh senior retirement home in Singapore.

== International work ==
TNS is committed to international exchange and networking between Singapore and other countries. Such exchange is done through staging the company's plays abroad, inviting foreign works to be presented by the company in Singapore, as well as through dialogues, workshops and training opportunities.

To date, the company has performed in Berlin, Birmingham, Busan, Cairo, Dublin, Glasgow, Hong Kong, Khabarovsk, Kuala Lumpur, London, Macau, Melbourne, New Delhi, Rijeka, Seoul, Sibiu, Sziget, Taipei and Tokyo. Resident Playwright Haresh Sharma also participated in a collaboration among Southeast Asian theatres, spearheaded by Setagaya Public Theatre in Tokyo, Japan, which culminated in a production in 2005.

TNS's Resident Playwright Haresh Sharma was one of four international playwrights commissioned by the Glasgow-based 7:84 Theatre Company to write a play on the theme of Separation and Reconciliation (as part of the celebration of the 300th Anniversary of the Act of Union between Scotland and England and the Scottish Elections). Sharma's play, Eclipse, is about the Indian/Pakistan partition as told by a young Singaporean man who is making a trip to his father's homeland in Pakistan. The play saw its world premiere on 11 April 2007, at the Traverse Theatre in Edinburgh, and subsequently toured to various theatres in Scotland, including the Citizens Theatre in Glasgow. Eclipse made its way back to Singapore for its Asian premiere as a full-length play as part of the 2008 M1 Singapore Fringe Festival.

The Virgin Labfest in Manila is a festival of new plays by emerging and well-known playwrights, directors and actors. It held its third edition from 28 June to 8 July 2007 at the Cultural Centre of the Philippines, and featured Haresh Sharma's Lizard as part of its International Night line-up, alongside a triple-bill featuring two other plays by Thai and Japanese playwrights. Lizard, originally presented by TNS in 1996, tells the story of a dysfunctional family involving a mother, son and maid. For the Manila staging, it was directed by Nicolas Pichay, and showcased a surreal and inertly violent depiction of a Singaporean household whose scheming, double-dealing, and at times cruel transactions negotiated with each other makes for a rather intense sala-set drama.

The theatre company's recent main season productions, Good People, Gemuk Girls, Model Citizens, Mobile 2: Flat Cities and Best Of toured to Kuala Lumpur in May 2008, December 2008, January 2011, September 2013 and January 2014 respectively. Best Of was also featured at Georgetown Arts Festival as part of Causeway EXchange in Penang, Malaysia in July 2013.

TNS collaborated with Tony Yap Company from Australia in 2009 for a brand new piece entitled Past Caring. In 2010, TNS collaborated with Theatre KnAM from Russia and presented Sofaman in Singapore and Khabarovsk. Another production entitled Crossings – a creative multidisciplinary collaboration with Croatian theatre company TRAFIK – was presented as part of Esplanade Theatre's The Studios in August 2012. The play then travelled to National Theatre, Rijeka, Croatia for stagings in September 2012.

Most recently, TNS worked with Japanese, Malaysian and Singapore artists to create Mobile 2: Flat Cities (see above). The production premiered in Singapore in August 2013 before touring to The Actors Studio @ KuAsh Theatre in Kuala Lumpur in September the same year.

== Theatre For Youth and Community ==
The Theatre For Youth Branch was set up in 1992 and renamed Theatre For Youth and Community (TFYC) in 2001. TFYC's principal interest is in theatre work with and for young people and different communities in Singapore. This includes presenting short plays during school assemblies, interactive Theatre-In-Education programmes, workshops, and process-based drama programmes that focus on personal development. Since 1992, TFYC has performed to more than 800,000 students, piloted drama programmes for school curriculum, and worked with numerous non-governmental organisations and voluntary welfare organisations. It was also responsible for the successful Marine Parade Theatre Festival (2000), FamFest (2001), The Necessary Community Festival (2001), M1 Youth Connection (1997–2003) and M1 Theatre Connect (2004).

Over a 3-year period beginning from April 2008, TNS began the Theatre For Seniors Ensemble (TFS), geared towards training the participants in various aspects of theatre-making and arts administration. This project is supported by the Council for 3rd Age, Kwan Im Thong Hood Cho Temple and the National Arts Council.

TFS successfully staged their end-of-year production Encore I, Encore II: Heartland! Heartland!, Encore III: Family Knots and Encore IV: Love Life to full houses in March 2009, 2010, 2011 and June 2013 respectively.

Currently, a spin-off group from TFS, now known as Theatre for Seniors Interest Group is exploring ways to continue their training and engagement with the public through performances and related events.

TNS also trained selected seniors as facilitators, so that they can work with the community on a wider level to engage other seniors in arts activities.

TFS was also commissioned to stage a successful production entities Old Flames as part of the 2013 My Queenstown Festival.

In January 2014, TFS was featured at the M1 Singapore Fringe Festival 2014: Art & the People, in Singapore's first seniors forum theatre production entitled Take Me or Leave Me!. One of the two plays in the production, Void Deck, is to be restaged as part of Passion Arts Festival 2014.

TNS has also worked with various non-governmental organisations, statutory boards and government ministries to present works dealing with specific issues to the public. Alzheimer's Diseases Association had commissioned the Company to create a full-length performance dealing with Alzheimer's diseases, Don't Forget to Remember Me, which was presented at Jubilee Hall over 4 performances.

Health Promotion Board has previously commissioned the Company to create and present Play Safe (a forum theatre piece on safe sex) as well as a scaled down version of Don't Forget to Remember Me in various community spaces.

TNS was commissioned by the Ministry of Community Development, Youth and Sports to present a skit on child abuse entitled Sweet Dreams, targeted at primary school students.

TNS has also worked with Centre for Biomedical Ethics on a play entitled Future Perfect, dealing with ethical issues in biomedical research, targeted at secondary school students. This skit is also restaged in 2013 (February/March and July/August 2013).

The company was also commissioned by Hospice Care Association to create a production entitled Don't Know, Don't Care, promoting caregiving amongst the young. This production toured schools in July 2012, and was restaged in May and July 2013, with a film adaptation that was recently completed. It will be restaged once again in July 2014.

Most recently, TNS worked on a commission by Singapore Maritime Foundation entitled The Project, focusing on career opportunities in the maritime industries. "The Project" toured to schools in the first half of 2013 and 2014.

== Publications ==
TNS has produced several publications. Still Building (1994), published by EPB, is a compilation of three plays by the company's Resident Playwright Haresh Sharma. Other early published work by Haresh include This Chord and Others (1999) – a compilation of six plays published by Minerva, and Off Centre (2000), published by Ethos Books.

In 1997, the company published 9 Lives – 10 Years of Singapore Theatre, a landmark book and the first of its kind featuring essays on Singapore theatre, commissioned by TNS.

Ask Not: TNS In Singapore Theatre, a collection of essays on examining the social, political, economic and artistic aspects of theatre-making in Singapore from the perspective of TNS, was published by Times Editions in 2004.

In 2007, Off Centre was selected by the Ministry of Education in Singapore as a literature text for the GCE ‘O’ and ‘N’ levels syllabi, and was republished by the company the same year.

In August 2007, a new volume of Interlogue: Studies in Singapore Literature, was published with a focus on the works of Haresh Sharma. The publication, written by Prof David Birch and edited by A/P Kirpal Singh, was an extensive investigation into Sharma's development as a writer.

In 2010, TNS published a new anthology of Haresh's plays entitled Trilogy, including the scripts and production notes of its three award-winning works, Fundamentally Happy, Good People and Gemuk Girls.

In 2011, two collections of short plays by Haresh Sharma entitled Shorts 1 and Shorts 2 were published by TNS.

The script of Those Who Can't, Teach, which was restaged as part of the 2010 Singapore Arts Festival, as well as Model Citizens, have also been published by Epigram Books.

A collection of plays entitled Plays for Schools with plays targeted at educators and students was published in late 2012.

TNS's recent collection of plays is entitled Don’t Forget to Remember Me, dealing with medical issues and launched at the Singapore Writers Festival in November 2013.

In May 2014, TNS launched the publication Best Of. The play was staged at the M1 Singapore Fringe Festival 2014 and 2014 to rave reviews, and also received popular and critical acclaim during its runs in Penang at the Georgetown Arts Festival 2013 as well as Kuala Lumpur in 2014. Following that in the same year, another publication Eclipse was launched; this production had previously been presented in Singapore and Scotland.

== The Triangle Project ==
The Triangle Project was established in 1992 to provide access to theatre for people from disadvantaged backgrounds. Under the programme, TNS connects donors with charitable organisations, with donors funding theatre tickets for beneficiaries.
