= Juliana Yasin =

Singaporean contemporary artist and curator

- Juliana in 2009
- Born: 1970; Singapore
- Died: 27 August 2014 (aged 44); Singapore
- Education: Certificate of Foundation (LASALLE College of the Arts, 1990); Diploma in Fine Art (TAFE Claremont Art School, 1994); BFA (Curtin University of Technology, 1996)
- Known for: Installation art, performance art, video art, painting
- Movement: Contemporary art

Juliana Yasin (1970 – 27 August 2014) was a Singaporean contemporary artist and curator whose practice spanned painting, installation, video, and performance art. Her works examined notions of identity, subjectivity, and community practices. Pedagogy and research further complemented her artistic practice, with Juliana having taught fine art at Kolej Bandar Utama in Kuala Lumpur and worked as a Singapore-based researcher for the Asia Art Archive, Hong Kong.

Juliana is notable as "one of the early voices of Malay women contemporary artists", exploring the position of Muslim women in Singaporean society through her practice since the 1990s. She was an active member of significant contemporary art groups in Singapore such as The Artists Village (TAV) and Plastique Kinetic Worms (PKW). Juliana also co-curated the first iteration of the community-based Jatiwangi Art Festival in 2006, later taking Jatiwangi in West Java, Indonesia as her "second home".

On 27 August 2014, following a long battle with cervical cancer, Juliana died aged 44.

== Education and personal life ==
Juliana was born in 1970 to a Chinese mother and a Malay father, both of Muslim faith. From 1989 to 1990, Juliana was a student at the LASALLE College of the Arts, leaving the college without completing her studies there. In 1993, she left Singapore to pursue her art education in Western Australia, graduating in 1994 with a Diploma in Fine Art from the TAFE Claremont Art School, Perth (now known as Central Institute of Technology). In 1996, she proceeded to obtain a Bachelor of Visual Arts from the Curtin University of Technology, Perth (now known as Curtin University).

Juliana's relationship with religion developed over the years. Her parents have been suggested to be conservative, with Juliana mentioning in a 1992 article in The Straits Times that she would "have to lock [her]self in [her] bedroom to paint [her] nude self-portraits." She wore headscarves as a teenager, only to stop during her university years in Australia; she also embarked on pilgrimages to Mecca and Medina.

Following her co-curation of the first Jatiwangi Art Festival in 2006, Juliana found a "second home" in Jatiwangi, West Java, Indonesia, returning to the semi-industrialised village several times over the years and continuing to organise some of her projects there.

In October 2007, Juliana was diagnosed with stage three cervical cancer, which went into remission following treatment. Juliana continued to practice art while receiving treatment, checking herself into hospital every day for chemotherapy while preparing for her solo show held at Plastique Kinetic Worms just two months later in December 2007.

In February 2014, she had to undergo intensive surgery following a relapse of the disease, which had spread to other organs. By March 2014, the local art community had rallied together for Artists for Artist, a fundraising exhibition to fund Juliana's medical treatment. Organised by Yvonne Lee, former director of the now-defunct Plastique Kinetic Worms, the exhibition included works from more than 40 artists, featuring prominent Singaporean artists such as Amanda Heng, Vincent Leow, and Tang Da Wu. Juliana succumbed to cancer on 27 August 2014, dying at the age of 44.

== Career ==
=== Early career and collaborations ===
Throughout her artistic career, Juliana participated in over 60 exhibitions locally and internationally, in countries such as Australia, Germany, Ireland and Poland. From the 1990s onwards, she was an active member of significant contemporary art groups in Singapore such as The Artists Village (TAV) and Plastique Kinetic Worms (PKW).

In 1991, for the National Sculpture Exhibition at the then-National Museum Art Gallery, Juliana performed alongside Amanda Heng and Ho Soon Yeen for Heng's performance work, Woman, Space and Objects, which explored the interconnections between exhibition site, objects, and the bodies of women. In their attempt to break from stereotypes, their performance envisioned an ironic outcome, with Heng parodying the stance of the Statue of Liberty. In 1992, Juliana once again worked with Heng to perform Her Identity alongside Ho and Chen Kun Yi for The Space, a significant exhibition organised by The Artists Village at the now-demolished Hong Bee Warehouse. Later in September 1992, Juliana exhibited work alongside Chen for A Frame of Mind, a two-artist exhibition exploring issues of women and the body as part of The Substation's New Criteria exhibition series.

After graduating from Curtin University of Technology, Perth in 1996, Juliana worked as a fine arts lecturer at Kolej Bandar Utama in Kuala Lumpur, only returning to Singapore in November 1998. Back in Singapore, she made a living through commissioned work and by teaching art to children.

=== Continued collaborations ===
In 1999, Juliana held her first solo exhibition at Plastique Kinetic Worms, entitled Collaborations. For the show, Juliana faxed copies of a photograph of herself to 16 artists based both locally and overseas, with instructions for them to alter her portrait. The original photograph featured Juliana wearing a traditional Sumatran Minangkabau headgear, shaped like a pair of water buffalo horns. The over 35 images of her face featured in the exhibition, some covered in graffiti or pink lace, and some hung like a toilet roll on the wall.

PKW continued to serve as a significant platform in Juliana's artistic career, with her being involved in festivals and exhibitions such as The Worms Festival I and II, Singapore in 1999 and 2000 respectively, and the Flag Project; PKW's 4th Annual Show in Singapore and South Korea in conjunction with the 2002 Gwangju Biennale. At PKW, Juliana also curated and participate in the performance and installation exhibition Fusion Strength in 2001, with it travelling to Indonesia and Australia in 2003 and 2005, respectively.

In 2001, for Kampung 2000, a four-day Malay theatre and arts festival at The Substation organised by Teater Ekamatra, Juliana staged The Veil, a performance artwork that examined Muslim female identity by taking the hijab and tudong as its starting point. For the performance, she cloaked herself in black and hid her face behind masks traditionally worn in areas of Saudi Arabia to indicate a woman's chastity and status as her husband's property. She held a placard in her hands that read: "The Subjugation of Women is a Worn-Out Habit in Saudi Arabia". While The Veil was shown in Singapore, Thailand and Germany, it was seen as controversial predominantly within Singapore, where Malay-language newspaper Berita Harian criticised the work's stance on Islam, with the Islamic Religious Council of Singapore (MUIS) further lodging a complaint against the event organisers. Juliana responded to media attention by explaining her desire to question narrow definitions of Muslim female identity. In an interview with Time Magazine, she stated: "I’m a Muslim, but the Koran doesn’t say you have to veil. That’s a man-made law."

In 2003, Juliana was the only female artist to show work for Berita Harian at The Substation, a group exhibition curated by Khairuddin Hori that sought to question the identity of Malay artists in Singapore. From 2004 to 2006, Juliana also worked as the Singapore-based researcher for Asia Art Archive, Hong Kong.

Juliana participated in the 2005 group exhibition Situation: Collaborations, Collectives & Artist Networks from Sydney, Singapore & Berlin at the Museum of Contemporary Art Australia, curated by Russell Storer. Also featured were other Singaporean artists from The Artists Village, including Tang Da Wu, Lee Wen, and Agnes Yit. Australian artist Colin G Reaney performed alongside Juliana for the exhibition.

=== Jatiwangi and after ===
In 2006, Juliana co-curated the first iteration of the Jatiwangi Art Festival in West Java alongside Bandung-based curator Heru Hikayat, in collaboration with Jatiwangi art Factory director Arief Yudi. The success of the first iteration in 2006 led the organisers to organise the second iteration of the Jatiwangi Art Festival in 2008. A community arts festival involving residencies for local and foreign artists to organise events with villagers in Jatisutera, West Java, Indonesia, it continued as a bi-annual art festival that sought to address social issues faced by the community.

Jatiwangi played an important role in Juliana's personal life and artistic practice; in 2009 she held a solo show, Tali Timba, at Jatiwangi art Factory, and in 2010 performed with her collaborators from Jatiwangi at the 6th Future of Imagination festival.

In December 2007, the solo exhibition Kites, Veils and Boarding Passes was held at Plastique Kinetic Worms, marking the developments in Juliana's artistic practice since 1991. Receiving her cervical cancer diagnosis just two months prior, Juliana staged the exhibition while undergoing daily chemotherapy sessions. Curated by Australian artist, longtime friend, and frequent collaborator Karee Dahl, the exhibition spanned three rooms and emphasised Juliana's use of veils, cloaks, and masks across her practice, also featuring a video library of Juliana's documented past performances.

Following Juliana's death in 2014, a selection of performance art photographs by Koh Nguang How was exhibited in 2016 at the Objectifs Centre for Photography and Film, Singapore, some documenting Juliana's performance work alongside other instances of performance art photography for the exhibition Two-Way Mirror.

External audio
- Tali Timba album on Soundcloud. Music Project with Juliana Yasin (Singapore), Dean Linguey (Australia), Mukti mukti, Tedi En, Beben Nurberi, @ Jatiwangi art Factory residency program, October - November 2009. Recorded in Pohaci Studio by Ibrahim Adi Surya.

In 2019, a selection of music and lyrics from Juliana's projects at Jatiwangi from 2009 to 2010 was posthumously exhibited at the 6th Singapore Biennale, curated by artistic director Patrick D. Flores. The music album Tali Timba from Juliana's solo exhibition in Jatiwangi in 2009 was presented with another 2010 album, For Peace and Togetherness: Tantejules dan Pemuda Inisiatif, which consisted of seven songs in English and Bahasa Indonesia "promoting and celebrating peace, love, and solidarity".

== Art ==
Juliana came from a background in painting, having done many portraits in particular. Juliana began to see herself as a subject, bringing the human face into her work and distorting it, fond of the idea of being able to convey a face by concealing it. This notion of concealment carries through in later works which feature masks, veils, and cloaks. While her identity as a Muslim woman artist led her to draw upon issues of the hijab and tudong in works such as The Veil (2001) or Covered, Veiled, Bound (2003), Juliana stated that she did not see herself as representing minority groups.

Collaboration was a significant aspect of Juliana's practice, whether with other artists, collectives, or communities, she described herself as being better able to "push [her] boundaries" when working with others. This manifested in her many collaborations with other artists and with collectives and groups such as The Artists Village, Plastique Kinetic Worms, and with communities in Jatiwangi. Australian artists Karee Dahl and Colin G Reaney were frequent collaborators of Juliana, performing alongside her at previous projects such as Traffic Space at Para Site, Hong Kong in 2001, The houseWORK Project at the Alliance Française de Singapour, Singapore in 2003, the CP Open Biennale, Jakarta in 2003, and TAV's Artists Investigating Monuments series in 2004/5.
