= 5th Passage =

Artist-run initiative in Singapore

View of the 5th Passage art space at Parkway Parade during Amanda Heng's performance of S/he at the Artists' General Assembly in 1993/4. Photo by Koh Nguang How.

The 5th Passage Artists Limited, commonly known as 5th Passage or 5th Passage Artists, was an artist-run initiative and contemporary art space in Singapore from 1991 to 1994. As a registered, artist-led non-profit organisation, it was one of the earliest of its kind for early-1990s Singapore, with its initial space located at Parkway Parade, a shopping centre in the east of the city. The "meteoric existence" of 5th Passage has been noted alongside other art collectives and alternative spaces existing in 1990s Singapore, such as The Artists Village, The Substation, Plastique Kinetic Worms, and Trimurti.

5th Passage was co-founded in 1991 by Suzann Victor, Susie Lingham, and Han Ling, later joined by Daniel Wong, Henry Tang and Iris Tan. The initiative's programming emphasised an interdisciplinary approach—it exhibited performance art, installation, music, photography, and design, also organising public readings and forums. Art critic Lee Weng Choy describes 5th Passage as an initiative that had "focused on issues of gender and identity, and on the work of women artists".

Within the history of Singapore's contemporary art, 5th Passage is often associated with its role in staging the 1994 performance work by Josef Ng, Brother Cane. Sensationalised media coverage of the performance led to a ten-year suspension of funding for unscripted performance art in Singapore, and the eviction of 5th Passage from Parkway Parade.

== History ==
=== Origins ===
In 1991, Singaporean artist Victor approached the corporate company that managed the Parkway Parade shopping centre to enquire about a space to display art. She was offered a two-year, rent-free lease for the fifth-floor passageway between the Office Tower Block and the car park, which she proposed to turn into a contemporary art space. The initiative was thus named for the fifth-floor passageway that it occupied.

Victor and Lingham would meet with Singaporean art critic T.K. Sabapathy, who served as an adviser to 5th Passage, to discuss the objectives of their organisation. They sought to run the organisation without support from public bodies, organising fundraising projects like setting up stalls at shopping centres to sell artists' craftwork. Structurally, 5th Passage did not impose a clear hierarchy between administrators and artists, with individuals taking on both roles. The initiative was envisioned as a platform for emerging artists at the time, exhibiting artists such as John Clang. 5th Passage also organised 12-hour long events that included local musicians and writers such as Stella Kon, Gopal Baratham and Philip Jeyaretnam. With their location at a crowded shopping centre, 5th Passage aimed to bring art directly to urban Singapore. This contrasted with another significant Singapore artist-run initiative, The Artists Village, which was located at a rural kampong area in Ulu Sembawang from 1988 to 1990. Victor's artist biography describes 5th Passage as having:

[...] diverted art (and artists) away from officially sanctioned spaces (and the rural) to flow instead into places of commerce (shopping centres) where people readily converge, thus engendering publics from two readymade resources—a readymade public within a readymade public space.

It was usual for Singaporean artists returning from art education overseas to inform other Singapore-based artists about ongoing international developments in art, as exemplified in the late 1980s by artist Tang Da Wu and his helming of The Artists Village (TAV) or earlier in the 1970s with the group of artists managing Singapore's Alpha Gallery, which included Choy Weng Yang, for instance. Significantly, none of the artists involved in co-founding 5th Passage had been overseas for studies, and are self-described by Lingham as being literal "home-grown" artists.

The New Paper's cover story of Josef Ng's performance artwork Brother Cane, "Pub(l)ic Protest", 3 January 1994

=== The Artists' General Assembly ===
From 26 December 1993 to 1 January 1994, the Artists' General Assembly (AGA) was held at the 5th Passage art space, an arts festival that the initiative co-organised with The Artists Village. During the 12-hour AGA New Year’s Eve show from 31 December 1993 to 1 January 1994, Josef Ng staged a performance work, Brother Cane, in protest at the arrest of 12 homosexual men during anti-gay operations in 1993, whose personal details were published in local mainstream newspapers.

During the final minutes of the performance, Ng turned his back to the audience and trimmed his pubic hair, a moment photographed by The New Paper. The resulting sensationalised newspaper article on 3 January 1994, titled "Pub(l)ic Protest", portrayed the performance as an obscene act. Following the public outcry, 5th Passage was charged with breaching the conditions of its Public Entertainment License, blacklisted from funding by Singapore's National Arts Council, and evicted from its Parkway Parade site. This was despite 5th Passage having secured the necessary permits and licences, and setting up audience advisory notices for the performances. Iris Tan, as the gallery manager of the 5th Passage, was prosecuted by the Singapore High Court alongside Ng. Described as one of the "darkest moments of Singapore’s contemporary art scene", the incident led to a ten-year no-funding rule for performance art, a ruling lifted only in 2003.

In 1994, 5th Passage received a ten-month offer to curate shows at vacant shop units in the Pacific Plaza shopping centre, which the initiative took up. Here, Victor produced works such as a performative installation that grieved for the silencing of 5th Passage and all Singapore artists. A site-specific exhibition, Personae II, held in 1996 at a hospital, would be the final show organised by 5th Passage. The founder-directors of the initiative would leave for further studies, and the group disbanded.

=== Present-day ===
While 5th Passage is now considered defunct, the initiative continues to be consistently invoked as a significant artist-run initiative within the history of Singapore's contemporary art. 5th Passage is very often referenced in relation to the controversial 1994 Brother Cane performance and the subsequent decade-long suspension of funding for performance art in Singapore.

Scholarship in 2019 notes the contrasting trajectories for 5th Passage and The Artists Village: While 5th Passage was essentially "rendered [the] scapegoat" with little data about the initiative circulating, "the persons of interest from TAV have since literally moved on and upward in the artworld". Pioneering Singaporean performance artist, Lee Wen, who was closely involved with The Artists Village's activities, would touch upon this disparity in 2013, apologising to Victor and Lingham in a written blog post:

Suzann Victor performing Still Waters (between estrangement and reconciliation) in 1998 at the Singapore Art Museum

how wrong we were to you that in all the dissertations and spoken debates we forgot your story. [...] not once did we understood [sic] how you stood by us in earnest support, silently observed and suffered neglect. Your space got shut down, your programs forgotten, your artists dispersed and your names disappeared from theses, journals and from discussions. My heart goes out to you both and in fact I like to say you did it your way and most elegantly deserve the victory that is yours to claim.

The initiative's artistic director, Victor and co-founder, Lingham, have continued to play significant roles within Singapore's contemporary art landscape. Noted for her installations, Victor was one of four artists selected to represent Singapore at its first national pavilion in 2001 at the 49th Venice Biennale, and until 2022, remained the only woman artist to have shown at the Singapore Pavilion for the art biennale in Venice. From 2013 to 2015, Lingham would serve as the Director of the Singapore Art Museum, later taking on the role of Creative Director for the 5th Singapore Biennale in 2016.

In 2019, the M1 Singapore Fringe Festival selected "Still Waters" as its theme, a direct reference to a 1998 performance by Victor. The work, Still Waters (between estrangement and reconciliation), was performed at the Singapore Art Museum, a rare publicly staged performance work between 1994 and 2003, described by Victor as a work responding to the de facto performance art ban and the loss of the 5th Passage space.

In 2021, 5th Passage: In Search of Lost Time was presented at Gajah Gallery, Singapore, an exhibition that brought together artists who had previously shown works with 5th Passage, including works from Lingham and Victor. The exhibition sought to revive a consciousness of the various activities, ideals, and aspirations of 5th Passage.
