= Lee Wen =

Singaporean performance artist

Lee Wen (李文)
- Born: 1957
- Died: 3 March 2019 (aged 61)
- Education: Lasalle-SIA College of the Arts; City of London Polytechnic
- Known for: Performance art
- Movement: Contemporary art
- Awards: 2005: Cultural Medallion (Visual Art)

Lee Wen (Chinese: 李文; pinyin: Lǐ Wén; 1957–2019) was a Singapore-based performance artist who shaped the development of performance art in Asia. He worked on the notion of identity, ethnicity, freedom, and the individual's relationship to communities and the environment. Lee's most iconic work is his performance series titled The Journey of a Yellow Man, which started as a critique of racial and ethnic identities in 1992 and has evolved into a meditation on freedom, humility, and religious practices over more than a decade. Painting his own body with bright yellow poster paint, he expresses an exaggerated symbol of his ethnic identity as a citizen of Singapore. He was also active in artist-run initiatives, especially as part of The Artists Village (TAV) in Singapore, the performance artist collective Black Market International, as well as the festivals Future of Imagination and Rooted in the Ephemeral Speak (R.I.T.E.S.). On 3 March 2019, he died due to a lung infection, at the age of 61.

== Education ==
Lee Wen studied in the now defunct Kim Keat Primary School and Raffles Institution. After finishing his A levels, he worked as a logistics officer, a computer operator and a bank officer. In 1988, he left behind his banking career to enroll at the Lasalle-SIA College of the Arts at the age of 30. Lee Wen expressed himself with both painting and various non-traditional media, being influenced by performance artist Tang Da Wu and other experimental artists Amanda Heng and Vincent Leow from The Artists Village. In 1990, Lee went on to study at the City of London Polytechnic, and it was then that Lee had found his true calling as a performance artist. He went on to develop the Yellow Man persona which gained him his first recognition in the arts community. The Journey of a Yellow Man, his most iconic performance series, has included performances, mixed-media installation, and paintings.

== Exhibitions and festivals ==
Lee Wen's work quickly gained international recognition since 1993, having performed and showcasing his artistic expressions in many international locations such as Gwangju Biennale and the Third Asia-Pacific Triennial of Contemporary Art (APT3), Queensland Art Gallery, Brisbane, Australia in 1999. Where he performed Journey of a Yellow Man No.13

His solo exhibitions include Journey of a Yellow Man No.3: DESIRE, The Substation, Singapore (1993); Neo-Baba, VA-Nishiogi Gallery, Tokyo (1995); Handmade Tales, The Black Box, Theatreworks, Singapore (1996); Everybody Should Be Happy, Utterly Art, Singapore (2002); Strange Fruit, The Substation, Singapore (2003); Unframed 7, P-10, Singapore (2004); Freedom of Daydreams, Mothers of Imagination, Your MOTHER Gallery, Singapore (2007); and Anthropometry Revision, Soo Bin Art Gallery, Singapore (2008).

In 2012, Singapore Art Museum organized a mid-career retrospective titled Lucid Dreams in the Reverie of the Real, featuring more than forty installations, photographs, and videos. In 2019, Hong Kong-based nonprofit Asia Art Archive organized an exhibition with his sketchbooks and notebooks, highlighting these as "sites of performance."

In 2003, Lee spearheaded The Future of Imagination, international performance art festival at The Substation and at the Sculpture Square in 2004, featuring international performance artists such as Alastair MacLennan from Northern Ireland, Irma Optimist from Finland, and Marilyn Arsem from USA. Lee saw the value of having an annual gathering of international artists in Singapore, to share a continuing interest in the cultural constructs of identity in the global situation and current trends of contemporary art practice, through live performances and discussion forms.

== Recognition and archive ==
Lee taught art at Tokyo National University of Fine Arts and Music and at his alma-mater back home in Singapore. He had also taught workshops at Hanoi University of Fine Arts, University of Ulster, UK, Universidad Autónoma Metropolitana, Mexico City, and Musashino Art University, Tokyo.

In 2005, Lee Wen was presented with the Cultural Medallion, the highest cultural award in Singapore, for his contributions to the development of local contemporary art scene.

In 2015, Lee Wen was shortlisted for the Joseph Balestier Award for the Freedom of Art, which honors a Southeast Asian artist or curator whose work is actively committed to advocating freedom. He won the award in 2016.

In collaboration with NTU Centre for Contemporary Art Singapore and National Gallery Singapore as a supporting collaborator, Asia Art Archive digitized the artist's personal archive, which includes materials about his practice as an artist, organizer, and writer starting in the early 1980s.

== See also ==
- Cultural Medallion
- The Artists Village (TAV)
