= The Artists Village =

Singapore-based contemporary art group

Signboard leading to 61-B Lorong Gambas, The Artists Village (1988–1990). Photo by Koh Nguang How.

The Artists Village (TAV) is a Singapore-based contemporary art group. TAV began as Singapore's first art colony, founded by contemporary artist Tang Da Wu in 1988. Apart from Tang, prolific performance artists such as Amanda Heng and Lee Wen were also closely associated with TAV.

TAV is best known for its engagement with societal changes and issues through late-1980s and 1990s Singapore, often through performance art, installation art, and process-based work. TAV is historicised as producing significant shifts in the history of Singapore's contemporary art. TAV's original space from 1988 to 1990 was a chicken farm at Lorong Gambas in Ulu Sembawang, which has since been redeveloped.

Members were among the earliest contemporary artists in Singapore to practice installation and performance art. At the Village, younger artists were informed about artistic developments unfolding internationally, often mentored by Tang. Exhibitions, happenings, and symposia were organised at the Village, and collaborations were embarked upon with the then-National Museum Art Gallery and the National Arts Council's Singapore Festival of Arts.

In 2008, the Singapore Art Museum held the retrospective, The Artist Village: 20 Years On, a 20th anniversary exhibition that sought to examine the "tensions, disjuncture and collision of the individual and collective memories of TAV" as a collective that had "engendered radical shifts in contemporary art throughout the 80s and 90s".

== History ==
=== Origins ===
In 1988, Tang returned to Singapore after completing his art education at Goldsmiths' College, University of London, along with his English wife Hazel McIntosh and his then-5-year-old son Ben Zai. The returning family took residence at 61-B Lorong Gambas in Ulu Sembawang, which was provided rent-free by Tang's relative.

Tang's performance at the second Open Studio Show (1989) in Lorong Gambas

By June 1998, Tang had started inviting like-minded artist friends to his home. They used the 1.6-hectare kampong space for their art practice, also discussing art during these informal gatherings. This gradually developed into an artist community that would show their work together at the Open Studio Show in January 1989. The show featured 10 artists: Tang himself, his brother Tang Dahon, Hazel McIntosh, Amanda Heng, Lim Poh Teck, Baet Yeok Kuan, Tang Mun Kit, Soh Siew Kiat, Vincent Leow, and Wong Shih Yaw. It was during this event that the name "The Artists Village" was first used. Tang had envisioned TAV as:

... [an] alternative venue dedicated to the promotion and encouragement of experimental and alternative arts in Singapore. It endeavors to establish an open space for artists to mature at their own pace, and to provide a conducive environment which allows them to experiment, experience and exchange ideas.

From 1989 onwards, performances and exhibitions were held by the artists living within the forested enclave. Populated by farm animals and durian trees, the site was one of the few rural spaces in highly urbanised Singapore. Art critic T.K. Sabapathy would describe the space and its early activity in a review of TAV's Open Studio Show, published in The Straits Times on 10 February 1989:

A colony of artists can be found in a cluster of zinc-roofed huts, with real farmers and chicken and pigs. [...] These artists have been drawn together by their common aims and methods of work. They are interested in art as a continuous process, instead of as a finished work.

In 1989 alone, 7 shows were held, one of which being The Happenings, a significant performance and installation exhibition held at the Nanyang Technological Institute. By the time The Drawing Room was held in December 1989, the scale of exhibitions had grown to include 400 works by 40 artists, and TAV had already become a significant aspect of the local arts ecology. At the height of the Village history, the colony housed 35 artists living and working in the area, with 50 others participating in other art activities by the Village.

On 31 December 1989 to 1 January 1990, TAV held The Time Show, a continuous 24-hour art event that was spread across the Lorong Gambas site, featuring performance art, dance, music, poetry, and other time-based work. The Time Show was one of TAV's last exhibitions to be held at the Lorong Gambas space.

=== After Lorong Gambas ===
In March 1990, the Village was forced to relocate when the Singapore government repossessed the Lorong Gambas site at Ulu Sembawang for urban development. While the chicken farm had already been pending requisition by the state even when TAV formed in 1988, the incident has been noted to demonstrate "the inter-dependent and unequal negotiations between the state and artists who were powerless in the face of the state."

In February 1992, TAV registered as a non-profit organisation under the Societies Act. With this status, TAV and its official members were eligible for participation in officially funded events, as well as the application for funding and space under the new rules by the National Arts Council, which had been established in 1991. TAV briefly relocated to rental houses at the Naval Base area in Sembawang, and existed nomadically at locations such as a garage space in Middle Road (that would become the site of Sculpture Square and later Objectifs) and notably the now-defunct Hong Bee Warehouse in Robertson Quay.

In May 1992, TAV used the Hong Bee Warehouse for The Space, a Fringe Festival visual arts event for the Singapore Festival of Arts 1992 jointly organised by TAV and the National Arts Council. After The Space concluded in June 1992, TAV obtained licensing to extend their use of Hong Bee Warehouse. This license ended on 8 January 1993, with the building slated for demolition soon after. While there were calls to save the Hong Bee Warehouse from demolition and to keep it as a space for the arts, the site was still eventually demolished.

=== The Artists' General Assembly ===
From January 1994, the local arts landscape was deeply affected by the decade-long suspension of funding for unscripted performance art in Singapore. The no-funding rule followed the staging of Brother Cane, a performance work by artist Josef Ng for the Artists' General Assembly (AGA), a week-long arts festival organised by TAV and 5th Passage Artists, taking place through New Year's Eve in 1993. Held at the 5th Passage Gallery in Parkway Parade Shopping Centre, the performance protested the violation of privacy for 12 homosexual men, whose identities were published in major local newspapers following their arrest during an anti-gay operation in 1993. During the final minutes of the performance, Ng trimmed his pubic hair with his back turned to the audience. This moment was photographed by The New Paper and sensationalised on the front page as an obscene act, resulting in an outcry from the general public. Ng and the gallery manager of 5th Passage were both prosecuted by the Singapore High Court, and the National Arts Council suspended all funding on performance art in Singapore, a ruling that was lifted only in 2003.

For those years, Tang and other performance artists mostly practised their art abroad, although some performances were presented in Singapore as dance or theatre. From 1995 to 1999, activity slowed for TAV, with only one major project during this period, Tour De Art Lah!, which involved a travelling bus fitted with installations and held in conjunction with the Singapore Festival of Arts in 1996.

=== Post-Ulu ===
In 1999, the induction of new members resulted in another spate of activity for TAV, with the show Post-Ulu held at the independent art space, The Substation. Featuring 12-hour overnight poetry recitals, live DJ sets, and performances, it marked a younger generation of TAV artists that had not necessarily experienced the original 61-B Lorong Gambas space. TAV continued to organise collaborations with other artists from the Southeast Asian region, and performances at locations such as the Heritage Conservation Centre, Pulau Ubin, and Bali.

=== Present-day ===
The Village continues to operate as a group, with over 30 members as of 2020. Several older members of TAV are also noted for establishing other independent art spaces and collectives in Singapore from the 1990s to 2000s, such as Plastique Kinetic Worms, Your MOTHER Gallery, p-10 and Post-Museum.

== Figures associated with The Artists Village ==
A number of artists and curators have been associated or involved with TAV's activity over the years, a non-exhaustive list including:

- Tang Da Wu
- Amanda Heng
- Lee Wen
- Vincent Leow
- Koh Nguang How
- Wong Shih Yaw
- Faizal Fadil
- Hazel McIntosh
- Tang Dahon
- Soh Siew Kiat
- Tang Mun Kit
- Baet Yoke Kuan
- Lim Poh Teck
- Ahmad Mashadi
- Juliana Yasin
- Ho Soon Yeen
- Lina Adam
- Woon Tien Wei
- Jeremy Hiah
- Kai Lam
- Agnes Yit
- Jennifer Teo
- Urich Lau
- Ezzam Rahman
- Marianne Yang
- Natasha Sophia
- Bridget Tay

== See also ==
- The Substation
- 5th Passage
- Plastique Kinetic Worms
