= Plastique Kinetic Worms =

Artist-run space in Singapore

The exterior of Plastique Kinetic Worms at 61 Kerbau Road, with its signboard subtitled as "A contemporary art space organised and managed by artists".

Plastique Kinetic Worms (PKW) was a Singapore-based artist-run space and contemporary art collective, co-founded in 1998 by Singaporean artists Vincent Leow and Yvonne Lee. PKW was one of the few artist-run spaces in Singapore when it opened in the late 1990s, with the 1990 closure of the Ulu Sembawang site of Singapore's first artist colony, The Artists Village, and the disbanding of artist-run space and initiative, 5th Passage, after 1994. Originally organised around a collective of 10 artists, PKW's membership would vary, with around 15 to 20 members at various points of its active years.

In his 2002 book, On the Mid-ground, international curator Hou Hanru would describe PKW as "the very centre of experimental activities of a new generation", a leading space for contemporary art in Singapore at that moment. PKW was known for its broad aims to support contemporary art in Singapore, from providing opportunities for international collaborations to serving as a platform for younger Singapore-based practitioners. Artists Juliana Yasin and Francis Ng for instance, would hold their first solo shows at PKW. Ng would notably continue on to represent at the Singapore Pavilion for the prestigious 50th Venice Biennale in 2003, alongside Heman Chong and Tan Swie Hian.

In relation to other artist-run spaces from the 1990s, PKW had clearer aspirations towards professionalisation, with discussions surrounding the space more frequently tied to notions of funding, sponsorship, and state support of the arts. PKW notably received a considerable amount of state recognition, a consistent recipient of major grant support from Singapore's National Arts Council.

In March 2008, after a decade of operations, the third iteration of PKW's space at 61 Kerbau Road would close due to a lack of funds, though the group intended to continue operating as a collective without a physical space.

== History ==
=== Origins at 68 Pagoda Street ===
In April 1998, a group of 10 artists including Leow and Lee organised a three-month project titled Plastique Kinetic Worms. Consisting of a series of five exhibitions, the shows were held at 68 Pagoda Street, taking the 1,400 sq ft ground floor of a newly renovated, three-storey pre-war Chinatown shophouse. The space had been offered to them rent-free for three months by its owner, who hoped the gesture would support the group of young artists. As the project emerged in the midst of the 1997 Asian financial crisis, space had been far more readily available at that moment in Singapore. The artists that would present work across the three months until 1 July 1998 included Stefan Jonsson, Sivakumaran, Jean Sim, Joyce Ng, Chua Chye Teck, Ng Siew Kuan, Low Eng Teong, Baet Yoke Kuan, and Lim Poh Teck.

Following the three-month exhibition project, Leow and Lee had further plans to keep the site and convert it into an art space, seeking patrons and sponsorships to cover rent, which was now offered to them at a reduced rate. Alongside a grant from the National Arts Council, they would also organise a fundraising exhibition, 500 & Below, which featured prints, paintings, photographs and sculptures by 16 local and foreign artists.

Leow and Lee would thus formally co-found and lead the art space and collective, Plastique Kinetic Worms (PKW), titled after the initial project's name. With broad aims to promote contemporary art in Singapore, the group of 10 artist-members continued to manage the 68 Pagoda Street site as an art space, with rental costs, exhibition organisation, and administrative duties shared among the members. In 1999, PKW registered as a non-profit organisation, a status that enabled the group to be eligible for National Arts Council grants, as well as participation in officially funded events.

=== Move to 199A/B South Bridge Road ===
In March 2000, after operating for two years at 68 Pagoda Street at reduced rental fees, PKW moved to 199A/B South Bridge Road. In 2001, PKW was awarded another grant from the National Arts Council, receiving S$75,000 as recognition of their work for Singapore's contemporary art landscape. The financial assistance resulted in the creation of PKW's Artist-in-Residence programme. State support further enabled the art collective to participate in art initiatives and events overseas. PKW would participate in the Gwangju Biennale in 2002, as well as collaborate with Indonesian contemporary art group Cemeti Art House (now known as Cemeti - Institute for Art and Society) to create a series of works for an exhibition titled 180 kg. PKW further worked on multiple collaborations and exchanges with art groups in countries such as Australia, Germany and Thailand.

=== 61 Kerbau Road and closure of space ===
On 31 December 2001, PKW moved to 61 Kerbau Road, the first visual arts group to be awarded a space under the Arts Housing Scheme by the National Arts Council. The new location allowed for multidisciplinary collaborations with other art groups located in the area, such as performance companies Spell#7 and Sri Warisan Performing Arts.

In May 2007, it was announced that PKW would be closing in March the following year due to high operational costs and depleting funds. With the growing number of artist-run galleries in Singapore, PKW had been losing artists and audiences. While they had considered handing the initiative over to younger artists, the collective, in discussion with its board members, decided against it due to the difficult financial state of the initiative—at certain points, the three staff members of PKW had to go for a month or two without salaries. To mark PKW's 10th anniversary and its final spate of activity, a series of exhibitions and the launch of its final publication titled Plastique Kinetic Worms was held at the Singapore Art Show in September 2007. In March 2008, PKW would formally close its 61 Kerbau Road premises. By then, PKW had decided that disbanding entirely was too drastic, and that they would continue as a collective without a physical space.

By the late 2000s, other artist-run initiatives such as Post-Museum, founded in 2007, and Grey Projects, founded in 2008, would be present within Singapore's contemporary art landscape.

== Activities ==
=== Worms Festival ===
The inaugural Worms Festival in 1999 was a multidisciplinary arts festival organised by PKW featuring art installations, short films, performances, and a flea market. Involving an international line-up of performers and artists, the 1999 iteration involved about 20 artistes and their collaborators, which included musician and television producer Najip Ali and mime artist Roy Payamal. The Worms Festival would continue as an annual event that would be held through the 2000s.

=== Artist-in-Residence programme ===
Due to financial assistance from the state, PKW was able to organise an Artist-in-Residence programme. In 2001, Christine Monceau, a French installation artist, became the collective's first artist-in-residence, with additional support from the French Embassy.

=== Vehicle quarterly ===
From April 2001, PKW began publishing Vehicle, a contemporary visual art quarterly. The journal contained articles and reviews on contemporary art in Singapore and the region, also serving as a catalogue on the works by PKW artists for an international audience. However, by 2002, the journal was deemed unsustainable and ceased publication.

== Figures associated with Plastique Kinetic Worms ==
A number of artists and curators have been associated or involved with PKW's activities over the years, a non-exhaustive list including:

- Vincent Leow
- Yvonne Lee
- Chua Ek Kay
- Milenko Prvački
- Ana Prvački
- Juliana Yasin
- Shubigi Rao
- Chua Chye Teck
- Baet Yoke Kuan
- Lim Poh Teck
- Jason Wee
