= Tang Da Wu =

Singaporean artist (born 1943)

Tang Da Wu (唐大雾)
- Born: 1943 (age 82–83); Singapore
- Education: BFA (Birmingham Polytechnic, 1974); MFA and doctorate (Goldsmiths' College, University of London, 1985 and 1988)
- Known for: Drawing, painting, sculpture, installation art, performance art
- Movement: Contemporary art
- Awards: 1995: Japanese Chamber of Commerce and Industry Foundation prize 1999: Arts and Culture Prize, 10th Fukuoka Asian Culture Prizes

Tang Da Wu (Chinese: 唐大雾; pinyin: Táng Dàwù, pronounced [tʰɑ̌ŋ tâ.û]; born 1943) is a Singaporean artist who works in a variety of media, including drawing, painting, sculpture, installation art and performance art. Educated at Birmingham Polytechnic and Goldsmiths' College, University of London, Tang gave his first solo exhibition, consisting of drawings and paintings, in 1970 at the Singapore Chinese Chamber of Commerce and Industry. He began engaging in performance art upon returning to Singapore in 1979 following his undergraduate studies.

In 1988, Tang founded The Artists Village. The first art colony to be established in Singapore, it aimed to encourage artists to create experimental art. Members of the Village were among the first contemporary artists in Singapore, and also among the first to begin practising installation art and performance art. There, Tang mentored younger artists and informed them about artistic developments in other parts of the world. He also organized exhibitions and symposia at the Village, and arranged for it to collaborate with the National Museum Art Gallery and the National Arts Council's 1992 Singapore Festival of the Arts.

In January 1994, the National Arts Council (NAC) stopped funding unscripted performance art following a controversial performance by Josef Ng that was regarded as obscene by many members of the public. From that time, Tang and other performance artists mostly practised their art abroad, although some performances were presented in Singapore as dance or theatre. For his originality and influence in performance art in Southeast Asia, among other things, Tang won the Arts and Culture Prize in 1999 at the 10th Fukuoka Asian Culture Prizes. The NAC eventually reversed its no-funding rule on performance art in September 2003. Tang was one of four artists who represented Singapore at the 2007 Venice Biennale. Tang's work is part of the collection of the Singapore Art Museum, Queensland Art Gallery and the Solomon R. Guggenheim Museum.

Tang has expressed concern about environmental and social issues through his art, such as the works They Poach the Rhino, Chop Off His Horn and Make This Drink (1989) and Tiger's Whip (1991). He believes in the potential of the individual and collective to effect social changes, and his art deals with national and cultural identities. Tang has participated in numerous community and public art projects, workshops and performances.

== Education and personal life ==
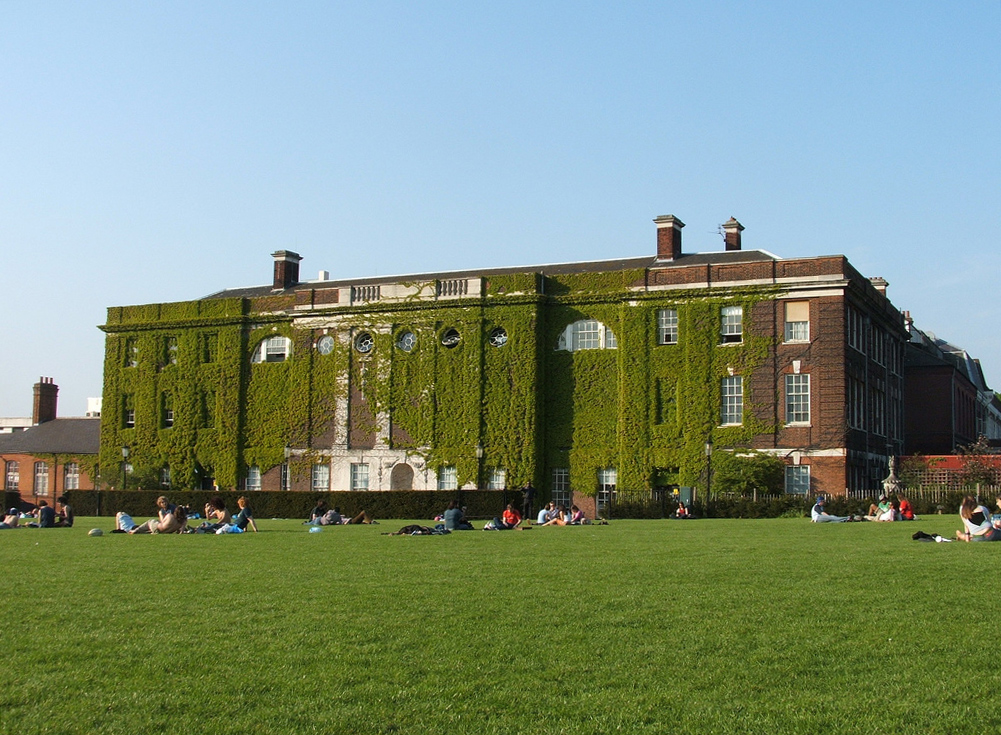
The Richard Hoggart Building of Goldsmiths' College, now known as Goldsmiths, University of London – photographed in May 2006

Tang Da Wu was born Thang Kian Hiong in Singapore in 1943, the eldest of four sons. His second brother Thang Kiang How is himself a visual artist based in Singapore. His father was a journalist with the Chinese daily newspaper Sin Chew Jit Poh He studied at a Chinese-medium school, but disliked English and mathematics and was often scolded by his teachers. He preferred playing after school with neighbourhood children and learned to speak Malay and Chinese from them. He also enjoyed drawing, and gained confidence when his secondary school paintings were accepted in art competitions.

In 1968, Tang was awarded a diploma in youth and community works from the National Youth Leadership Institute. Two years later, in 1970, his first solo exhibition of drawings and paintings sponsored by the Singapore Art Society was staged at the Singapore Chinese Chamber of Commerce and Industry. Subsequently, he went to the United Kingdom to study, majoring in sculpture. He graduated with a Bachelor of Fine Arts (BFA), with first class honours, from the School of Fine Art, Birmingham Polytechnic, in 1974. While abroad he changed his name to Da Wu, which is Mandarin for "big mist". Tang later returned to the UK and attended advanced courses at the Saint Martins School of Art. He received a Master of Fine Arts (MFA) in 1985 from Goldsmiths' College, University of London, and a doctorate in 1988.

Tang is married to an Englishwoman, Hazel McIntosh. They have a son, Ben Zai, known professionally as Zai Tang, who is a sound artist living in the UK.

== Career ==
=== Early career and founding of The Artists Village ===
Returning to Singapore in 1979 after completing his undergraduate studies, Tang engaged in performance art, works of art that are composed of actions performed by the artist at a certain place and time. The following year, he staged a work of installation art called Earthworks at the National Museum Art Gallery. This comprised two works, The Product of the Sun and Me and The Product of the Rain and Me, which were made up of dishes of earth, lumps of soil, and pieces of soiled and water-stained linen which he had hung in gullies at Ang Mo Kio, a construction site in the process of being turned into a public housing estate. Installation art uses sculptural materials, and sometimes other media such as sound, video and performance, to modify the way a particular space is experienced.

In 1988, Tang founded The Artists Village, originally located at 61B Lorong Gambas in rural Ulu Sembawang, in the north part of Singapore. The first art colony to be established in Singapore, its goal was to inspire artists to create experimental art. Tang described the Artists Village as:

... [an] alternative venue dedicated to the promotion and encouragement of experimental and alternative arts in Singapore. It endeavors to establish an open space for artists to mature at their own pace, and to provide a conducive environment which allows them to experiment, experience and exchange ideas.

T.K. Sabapathy noted: "The Village was a beacon, and Da Wu both a catalyst and mentor." Among the artists who moved to the Village were Ahmad Mashadi, Faizal Fadil, Amanda Heng, Ho Soon Yeen, Lim Poh Teck, Tang Mun Kit, Wong Shih Yaw, Juliana Yasin and Zai Kuning. They were among the first contemporary artists in Singapore, and also among the first to begin practising installation art and performance art. Tang mentored younger artists and exposed them to artistic developments in other parts of the world. He also organized exhibitions and symposia at the Village, and arranged for collaborations with the National Museum Art Gallery and the National Arts Council's 1992 Singapore Festival of the Arts. Although The Artists Village lost its original site in 1990 due to land development, it was registered as a non-profit society in February 1992 and now stages events in various public spaces.

=== Difficulties with performance art ===
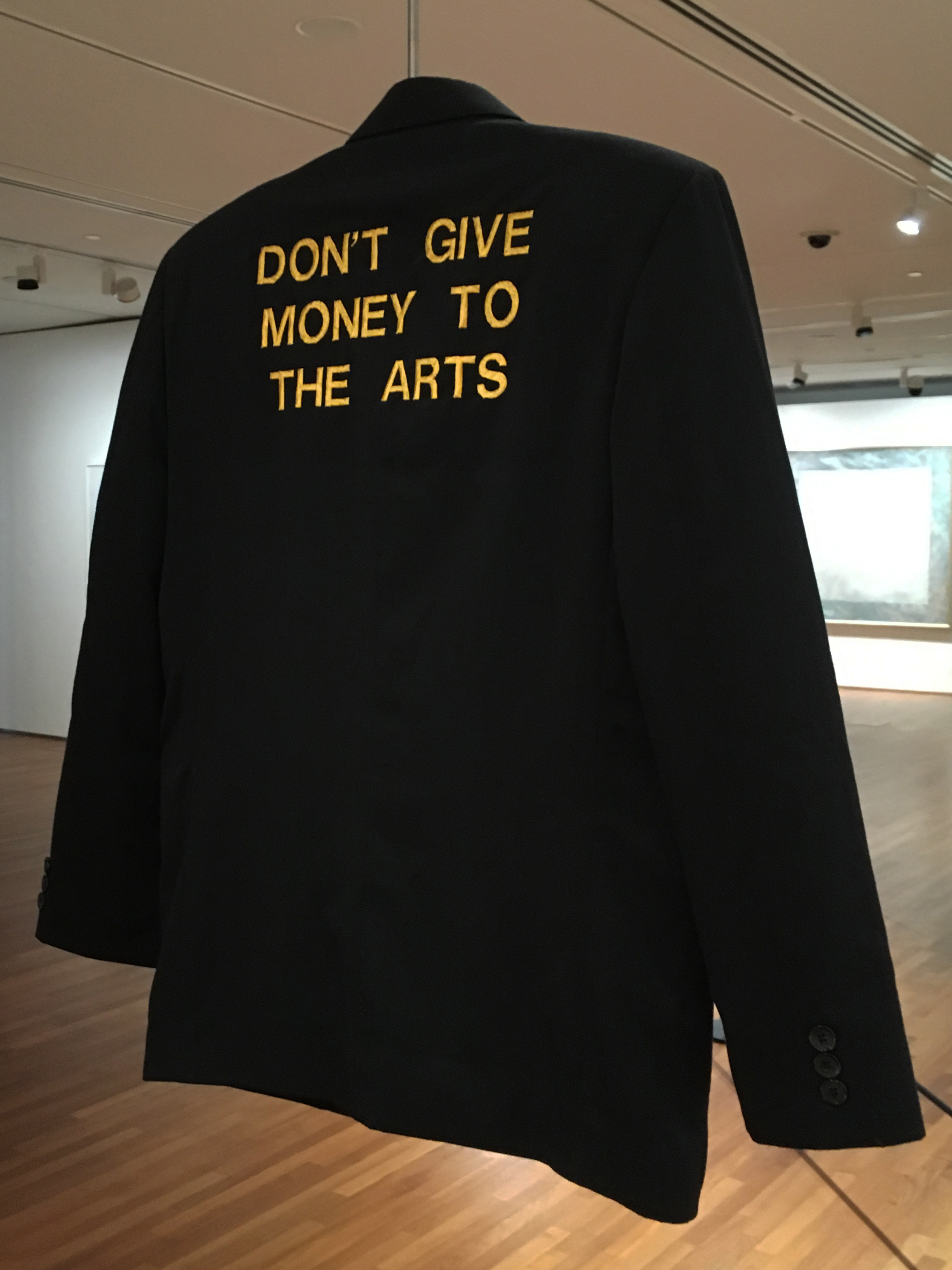
Tang Da Wu, Don't Give Money to the Arts, 1995, Cloth jacket, Collection of National Gallery Singapore

In January 1994, artist Josef Ng cut off his pubic hair with his back to the audience during a performance protesting the media's coverage of gay issues. The event was reported by The New Paper, and the resulting public outcry over its perceived obscenity led the National Arts Council (NAC) to cease funding unscripted performance art. After that, Tang and other performance artists practised their art mostly abroad, although some performances were presented in Singapore as dance or theatre. Interviewed in August 2001, T. Sasitharan, co-director of the Practice Performing Arts School, said that a review of the NAC's policy was "long overdue" and noted that although Tang had received the Fukuoka Asian Culture Prize in 1999, "the art form he practises is de facto banned in Singapore". The NAC eventually reversed its no-funding rule on performance art in September 2003.

In August 1995, the President of Singapore Ong Teng Cheong visited Singapore Art '95, an exhibition and sale of artworks by Singapore artists. Tang wore a black jacket emblazoned on the back with "Don't give money to the arts" in yellow and handed a note to the President that read, "I am an artist. I am important." Although Tang was prevented from speaking to the President by an aide-de-camp, he later told the media he wished to tell the President that artists are important and that public money funded the "wrong kind of art", art that was too commercial and had no taste.

=== Recent activities ===
Tang was the subject of one episode of artist Ho Tzu Nyen's documentary television series 4x4 Episodes of Singapore Art, which was broadcast on Arts Central (present-day Okto channel) in October 2005. He was also one of the four artists representing Singapore at the 2007 Venice Biennale. He presented an installation, Untitled, consisting of two beds positioned upright, the trunks of plantain trees, a portable ancestral altar, a handmade album of drawings and photographs, and other found objects. Drawings of people and faces were strapped to the beds and wrapped around the tree trunks. The installation was accompanied by a recording by Tang's son, Zai Tang, of sounds captured in Venice during a single day. The work was described by the National Arts Council as suggestive of "the restlessness, rootlessness, spiritual wandering and emotional estrangement that mark the travelling life". In 2007, a work by Tang consisting of ink paintings around a well, and representing the erosion of village communities by urban development, was acquired by the Queensland Art Gallery for its Gallery of Modern Art. From January to June 2016, Tang presented Earth Work 1979 at the National Gallery Singapore, a re-staging of his 1979 exhibition, the first recorded instance of Singapore land art. The exhibition includes "Gully Curtains", where Tang placed large pieces of fabric between gullies and let the rain and sun mark the fabric. His work Tiger's Whip (1991) is also displayed at the National Gallery's DBS Singapore Gallery. In 2017, Tang started the performance-art group Station House Da Opera, comprising more than 60 art educators, students, and fellow local artists.

Known for his reticence, Tang remains an enigmatic person. In an August 2008 interview with the Straits Times, fellow artist Vincent Leow said of Tang: "He's a very hands-on person, very improvisational and has good ideas. But he doesn't really talk much. You can't really tell who he is."

== Art ==
Tang has expressed concern about environmental and social issues through his art, such as the works They Poach the Rhino, Chop Off His Horn and Make This Drink (1989), Under the Table All Going One Direction (1992) and Tiger's Whip, also known as I Want My Penis Back (1991). He first presented the latter work, an installation and performance piece, in 1991 in Singapore's Chinatown. It consisted of ten life-sized tigers made from wire mesh covered with white linen. Tang, wearing a sleeveless white garment, would perform amidst them as poacher, tiger, and man consuming the tiger's penis.

Tang Da Wu & the participants of A Sculpture Seminar, Tiger's Whip (also known as I Want My Penis Back), 1991, Mixed media, Dimensions variable, Collection of the Singapore Art Museum

A modified version of the work was further developed as an installation during the two-week A Sculpture Seminar organised by Tang in 1991 to discuss ideas about sculpture, with many artists from The Artists Village participating. Tang brought one of the tigers from his earlier performances of Tiger's Whip as a teaching tool, and participants contributed their thoughts on its form and structure. This process led to the creation of the final form of the installation, collaboratively developed and exhibited during A Sculpture Seminar, as a single tiger pouncing on a rocking chair, with a trail of red fabric akin to a stream of blood. In February 1995, the Museum chose Tiger's Whip to represent Singapore at the Africus International Biennale in Johannesburg, South Africa. Another of Tang's works in the Singapore Art Museum is an untitled sculpture often called Axe (1991), which is an axe with a plant growing out of its wooden handle. It is regarded as an early example of found object art in Singapore.

A focus of Tang's art is the theme of national and cultural identities, I Was Born Japanese (1995) being an example. Tang notes that he has had four nationalities. He was issued with a Japanese birth certificate as he was born during the Japanese Occupation of Singapore. He became a British national after World War II, a Malaysian citizen when Singapore joined the Federation of Malaysia in 1963, and a Singaporean citizen when Singapore gained full independence in 1965. While living in the UK he was conscious of his Chinese identity, but later on he took the view that he might not be fully Chinese since China had been occupied by the Mongols and Manchurians: "I'm not sure if I'm 100% Chinese blood. I'm sure my ancestor has got mixture of Mongolian and even Thai and Miao people [sic]. We are all mixed, and this is true. But I always like to think that there is only one race in the world. We are all one human race." Another of Tang's performances, Jantung Pisang – Heart of a Tree, Heart of a People, centres around the banana tree. He was inspired by the fact that the banana is used widely in Southeast Asia as an offering to bring blessings, but is also feared as it is associated with ghosts and spirits. He also sees banana trees as a reminder of the lack of democracy in certain parts of the world: "Democracy in many Asian countries and Third World countries is as shallow as the roots of a banana tree. We need to deepen [democracy]."

Tang has participated in numerous community and public art projects, workshops and performances, as he believes in the potential of the individual and collective to effect social changes. He has said: "An artist should introduce to others what he sees and learns of something. His works should provoke thoughts, not to please the eyes or to entertain, much less for decoration."

== Awards ==
Tang received a Singapore International Foundation art grant to participate in the International Art Symposium in Meiho, Japan, in October 1994. In March the following year, he received a trophy and S$20,000 from the Japanese Chamber of Commerce and Industry Foundation. For his originality and influence in performance art in Southeast Asia, among other contributions, Tang won the Arts and Culture Prize in 1999 at the 10th Fukuoka Asian Culture Prizes which were established by Fukuoka and Yokatopia Foundation to honour outstanding work of individuals or organizations to preserve and create the unique and diverse culture of Asia.

== Major exhibitions and performances ==
Dates	Title	Medium	Location
1970	Drawings and Paintings (first solo exhibition)	Drawing, painting	Singapore Chinese Chamber of Commerce and Industry; Singapore
1972	Touch Space; Midland Art 72	Sculpture	Dudley Museum; Dudley, England, UK
1973	Crowds; Forward Trust Painting Competition	Painting	Birmingham, England, UK
1975	Marking over Marks	Painting	Royal Overseas League; London, England, UK
1978	Marks – Black Powder Falling Through Muslin	Installation	ACME Gallery; London, England, UK
1980	Earthworks (works from Earthworks, 1979–1980)	Installation	National Museum Art Gallery and Sin Chew Jit Poh Exhibition Centre; Singapore
1981	Save the Forest	Performance	Epping Forest, Greater London and Essex, England, UK
1982	Five Days at NAFA; Five Days in Museum	Performance	Nanyang Academy of Fine Arts and National Museum; Singapore
1983	Sumi	Performance	Lyndhurst Hall Studio; London, England, UK
1983	Movement in a Circle	Performance	London Musician Collective; London, England, UK
1983	Flying Marks; ALTERNATIVA III, Festival of Performance	Performance	Almada, Portugal
1983	In Between; Change; 4th Performance Platform	Performance	Nottingham, England, UK
1984	The 1984 Show	Performance	Brixton Art Gallery; Brixton, London, England, UK
1984	You're Welcome; The Door – The Birth; Second International Festival of Performance	Performance	Brecknell, England, UK
1984	Jufu – Best Wishes	Performance	Ikebana Trust; London, England, UK
1984	A Fish/A Path; Responding to You	Performance	Townhall Studio; Swindon, England, UK
1984	Every Other Move	Painting	Oporto, Portugal
1985	The Support	Performance	Woodland Gallery; Greenwich, London, England, UK
1985	Steaming Laundry	Performance	Brixton Art Gallery; London, England, UK
1986	No Fancy Brushes	Performance	Royal Festival Hall; London, England, UK
1986	New Life	Painting	Royal Festival Hall; London, England, UK
1986	In the End, My Mother Decided to Eat Dogfood and Catfood; Orchard Road Weekend Art Fair	Performance	Orchard Road, Singapore
1987	Four Days at the National Museum Art Gallery	Performance	National Museum; Singapore
1987	People	Painting	The Oval Gallery; London, England, UK
1988	In Case of Howard Lui; Incident in a City; Singapore Festival of Arts Fringe	Performance	Old St. Joseph's Institution building Singapore
1988	Who Polluted the Canal? Islington City Art '88	Performance	London, England, UK
1989	To Make Friends is All We Want in 1989; Big O Concert with music performance by Joe Ng of Corporate Toil, Singapore Music Festival 1989	Performance	Orchard Road, Singapore
1989	Life Boat	Performance	Cuppage Village; Singapore
1989	The Artists Village Show Home Documentation	Drawing, painting	Art Base Gallery; Singapore
1989	Gooseman; Open the Gate; Dancing UV; Selling Handicaps; In the End, My Mother Decided to Eat Dogfood and Catfood; The Artists Village 2nd Open Studio Show	Performance	The Artists Village; Lorong Gambas, Singapore
1989	They Poach the Rhino, Chop Off His Horn and Make This Drink	Performance	National Museum Art Gallery, National University of Singapore and Singapore Zoo; Singapore
1989	The Third Asian Art Show	Painting	Fukuoka Art Museum; Fukuoka, Japan
1989–1990	Dancing by the Ponds; Sunrise at the Vegetable Farm; The Time Show – 24 Hours Continuous Performance Show	Performance	The Artists Village; Lorong Gambas, Singapore
1990	The Death of the Philipino Maid; Singapore Festival of Arts Fringe 1990	Performance	Shell Theatrette; Singapore
1990	Stop that Tank – One Year Anniversary of 4 June; Singapore Festival of Arts Fringe 1990	Performance	PUB Auditorium; Singapore
1990	Noah's Ark for Plants; Singapore Festival of Arts Fringe 1990	Performance	Wisma Atria; Singapore
1990	Serious Conversations; Singapore Festival of Arts Fringe 1990	Performance	Raffles Place, Singapore
1990	T or P? That is the Question; The Arts for Nature exhibition commemorating World Environment Day	Performance	Empress Place Museum; Singapore
1990–1999	North-East Monsoon – A Water Game	Project	Singapore and other places
1991	Tiger's Whip	Performance	National Museum and Chinatown; Singapore Fukuoka Art Museum; Fukuoka, Japan
1991	Four Persons in One Suit, in the Streets of Singapore; A Sculpture Seminar	Performance	National Museum; Singapore
1991	The Ark for Plants; Tree Celebration	Performance	The Substation; Singapore
1991	Chinese Restaurant II; National Sculpture Exhibition	Performance	National Museum; Singapore
1991	World's Number One Pet Shop; National Sculpture Exhibition	Performance	National Museum; Singapore
1991	Just in Case; National Sculpture Exhibition	Performance	National Museum; Singapore
1991	Switch Off the Lights, Please; Raw Theatre I	Performance	The Substation; Singapore
1991	Asian Artist Today – Fukuoka Annual V: Tang Da Wu Exhibition (They Poach the Rhino, Chop Off His Horn and Make This Drink, In the End, My Mother Decided to Eat Dogfood and Catfood, and Tiger's Whip)	Performance	Fukuoka Art Museum; Fukuoka, Japan
1992	Under the Table All Going One Direction; New Art from Southeast Asia 1992		Tokyo Metropolitan Artspace; Tokyo, Japan Fukuoka Art Museum; Fukuoka, Japan Hiroshima City Museum of Contemporary Art; Hiroshima, Japan Kirin Plaza; Osaka, Japan
1993	Who Owns the Cock; Baguio Arts Festival	Performance	Baguio, Philippines
1993	And He Return Home When You Least Expected; 2nd ASEAN Workshop, Exhibition and Symposium on Aesthetics	Performance	Philippines
1994	Sorry Whale, I Didn't Know that You Were in My Camera; Creativity in Asian Art Now, Part 3 – Asian Installation Work	Installation	Hiroshima City Museum of Contemporary Art; Hiroshima, Japan
1994	Contemporary Shopping	Sculpture	Faret Tachikawa; Tokyo, Japan
1994	Colours Don't Help; Artists Against AIDS		Singapore
1994	No! I Don't Want Any Black Monsoon	Performance	Mojosongo, Solo, Indonesia
1994–1995	Tapioca Friendship Project	Project	Osaka International Peace Center; Osaka, Japan; and Singapore
1995	Meeting with the Real Chiang Maian; 3rd Chiang Mai Social Installation	Performance	Chiang Mai, Thailand
1995	I was Born Japanese	Performance	Mojosongo, Solo, Indonesia
1995	Don't Buy Present for Your Mother on Mother's Day	Performance	The Substation; Singapore
1995	Don't Give Money to the Arts; Asian International Art Exhibition and Singapore Art '95	Performance	National Museum Art Gallery; Suntec City; Singapore
1996	Root Sculpture	Sculpture	Nanao International Artist's Camp '96; Nanao, Japan
1996	One Hand Prayer Project	Project	Hiroshima City Museum of Contemporary Art; Hiroshima, Japan
1996	Subject Matter	Project	Japan, Malaysia, Singapore and the UK
1996	Life in a Tin	Project	Malaysia, Singapore and others
1996	Rubber Road No U-Turn	Project	Malaysia, Singapore and others
1998	Sorry Whale, I Didn't Know that You Were in My Camera; Contemporary Art in Asia: Traditions/Tensions	Installation	Art Gallery of Western Australia; Perth, Australia
1999	Don't Worry Ancestors	Project	Singapore
1999	Life in a Tin; First Fukuoka Asian Art Triennale	Project	Fukuoka Asian Art Museum; Fukuoka, Japan
2000	Tapioca Friendship; Gwangju Biennale		Gwangju, South Korea
2001	Under a Banana Leaf; Echigo Tsumarigo		Japan
2002	Singapore Pools – Water Games	Project	Singapore
2003	Many Heads and Local Heroes	Project	Singapore
2004	Satsuma Brilliance	Sculpture (stained glass)	Kirishima Open Air Museum; Kirishima, Japan
2004	Interakcje	Performance	Piotrków Trybunalski, Poland
2005	Art Brickfest	Sculpture	Wheelock Place; Singapore
2005	Your Head		Your Mother's Gallery; Singapore
January–February 2006	Jantung Pisang – Heart of a Tree, Heart of a People; Ran	Painting	Jendela visual arts space, Esplanade – Theatres on the Bay; Singapore
9–25 February 2006	Tang Da Wu: Heroes, Islanders	Painting	Valentine Willie Fine Art; Kuala Lumpur, Malaysia
10 June – 7 November 2007	Untitled; Singapore Pavilion at the 52nd Venice Biennale International Art Exhibition	Installation	Istituto Veneto di Scienze, Lettere ed Arti, Palazzo Cavalli Franchetti; Venice, Italy
29 January – 2 May 2010	Classic Contemporary: Contemporary Southeast Asian Art from the Singapore Art Museum Collection (group exhibition)	Installation	8Q SAM, Singapore
4 August – 29 August 2010	Singapore Survey 2010: Beyond LKY (group exhibition)	Installation	Valentine Willie Fine Art, Singapore
5 August – 28 August 2011	(龍婆缝衣) First Arts Council	Installation, painting	Valentine Willie Fine Art, Singapore
8 – 14 September 2011	Jaga Anak Baik-Baik	Installation, paintings	Goodman Arts Centre Gallery, Singapore
15 March – 10 April 2013	Situationist Bon Gun (二十年目睹现象)	Installation, performance	Institute of Contemporary Arts Singapore
22 February 2013 – 20 July 2014	No Country: Contemporary Art for South and Southeast Asia (group exhibition); Guggenheim UBS MAP Global Art Initiative – Volume 1: South and Southeast Asia (Our Children, 2012)	Installation	Solomon R. Guggenheim Museum, USA, Asia Society Hong Kong Centre, China and NTU Centre for Contemporary Art, Singapore
5 August – 13 September 2015	Singapore Survey 2015: Hard Choices (group exhibition)	Installation	Artspace@Helutrans, Singapore
22 January – 19 June 2016	Earth Work 1979	Installation, painting	National Gallery Singapore
27 August – 7 September 2016	Paintings	Paintings	artcommune gallery, Singapore
4 August – 8 October 2017	Hak Tai’s Bow, Brother’s Pool and Our Children (学大弓麦脑池和我们的孩子)	Installation, performance, seminar	Nanyang Academy of Fine Arts, Singapore
10 October 2018 – 15 September 2019	Awakenings: Art in Society in Asia 1960s–1990s (group exhibition) (They Poach the Rhino, Chop Off His Horn and Make This Drink, 1989 and Gully Curtains, 1979/2016)	Installation	National Museum of Modern Art, Tokyo, Japan; National Museum of Modern and Contemporary Art, South Korea; and National Gallery Singapore, Singapore
12 – 31 January 2019	Contending Boundaries: Tang Da Wu, Wong Keen & Yeo Hoe Koon	Paintings	Artspace@Helutrans, Singapore
6 September – 3 November 2019	Sembawang: The D.D. Land and Sembagraphie	Installation, performance, workshop, video	Nanyang Academy of Fine Arts, Singapore

Some of the information in the table above was obtained from [Tang Da Wu: Artist CV], Valentine Willie Fine Art, 2006, archived from the original on 10 February 2008.
