= Cynthia Delaney Suwito =

Indonesian artist (born 1993)

- Born: 1993 (age 32–33); Jakarta, Indonesia
- Occupation: Artist
- Notable work: Knitting Noodles (2014)

Cynthia Delaney Suwito (born 1993) is an Indonesian artist currently based in Singapore. Her works often explore themes of time and daily rituals. She is most well known for her use of instant noodles as art material.

== Background ==
Suwito was born in Jakarta, Indonesia in 1993. She graduated with a BA in Fine Arts with first-class honours from LASALLE College of the Arts, Singapore in 2016. She is currently residing and working in Singapore.

== Notable works ==
Suwito's most well-known work is a performance art titled Knitting Noodles (2014), in which she knitted a length of boiled instant noodles into a scarf. In an interview with Channel News Asia, she revealed that she started using instant noodles for art in late 2014, with the concept of contrasting the instantness of the noodles with the slower pace of knitting. The resulting sculpture from the performance art, Knitted Noodles (2015) was exhibited at Harper's Bazaar Art Prize in 2015.

Holding Breath (2016- 2017) was an interactive installation which consisted of a video compilation of people holding their breaths as symbolic 'donations' to the work, a wall of certificates recording the 'donations', and an interactive segment where visitors could participate in the process during its exhibition at Affordable Art Fair 2016. It was one of her works featured at Bandung Contemporary Art Awards in 2017.

== Press ==
Suwito started gaining worldwide recognition when her work Knitting Noodles (2014) was featured in an article by CNA in 2016.

In 2017, Suwito was featured in an article on Lianhe Wanbao. She also had a video feature by BBC, radio coverage by Busan eFM, as well as television coverage by Nippon TV and TBS.

In 2018, Suwito was featured by the Indonesian TV channel Trans7.

== Awards ==
- 2015: Harper's Bazaar Art Prize (finalist)
- 2017: Forbes 30 Under 30 Asia: The Arts
- 2017: 5th Bandung Contemporary Art Award
