= Vincent Leow =

Singaporean artist and art educator

Vincent Leow (廖光炎) is a Singaporean artist.

== Early life and education ==
Born in Singapore in 1961, Leow graduated from LASALLE College of the Arts in 1987 with a Diploma in Fine Art, majoring in sculpture. He subsequently earned a Master of Fine Arts (MFA) from the Maryland Institute College of Art (MICA) in Baltimore in 1991. In 2005, Leow attained a Doctorate in Fine Art from the Royal Melbourne Institute of Technology (RMIT).

== Teaching career ==
Leow served as LASALLE's Head of Sculpture Department from 1992 to 1996, and Senior Lecturer for the MA in Fine Arts programme from 2003 to 2007. He was the associate professor at Sharjah University College of Fine Arts from 2008 to 2013. Leow now teaches at the Singapore School of the Arts.
