= First City University College =

Private university college in Malaysia

Coordinates: 3°08′15.6″N 101°36′25.5″E

- Motto: Way Ahead
- Type: Private
- Established: 1990
- Parent institution: First Nationwide Group
- Chancellor: Datuk Yaacob Wan Ibrahim
- Vice-Chancellor: Prof. Dr. Saw Sor Heoh
- Director: Tan Sri Dato’ Dr. Teo Chiang Liang
- Location: Bandar Utama, Petaling Jaya
- Website: https://firstcity.edu.my/

First City University College is a private higher education institution, established by the First Nationwide Group, the owner and developer of the 1000 acres integrated township and commercial district of Bandar Utama in Petaling Jaya, Selangor.

First City University College provides higher education in the fields of Business, Computing/IT, Design & Built Environment, Engineering, Hospitality & Hotel Management and Mass Communication.

== History ==
First City University College was established in 1990 as Kolej Swasta Bandar Utama (KSBU) before it was renamed as Kolej Bandar Utama (KBU) in 1993.

In 2002, KBU was renamed for the second time as KBU International College. In 2014, KBU International College received approval from the Ministry of Higher Education to be elevated to University College. On 2 December 2015, KBU International College was officially proclaimed as First City University College in a ceremony held on its campus grounds in Bandar Utama, Petaling Jaya.

== Campus & Facilities ==
First City University College's campus sits on a 13-acre site in the International Education Hub of Bandar Utama in Petaling Jaya.

The campus offers on-campus student accommodation (First City Residence) with 24-hour security by the auxiliary police. Its Sports Centre offers various indoor and outdoor sports and recreational facilities for students e.g. football field, volleyball courts, futsal, table-tennis, badminton courts and basketball court.

Future Tech Laboratories:

1. Robotics and Artificial Intelligence (AI)
2. Internet of Things (IoT) & Sensor

Engineering Laboratories:

1. Analogue Laboratory
2. Communication & Signal Processing Laboratory
3. Digital Electronics Laboratory
4. Electronic Computer Aided Design Laboratory
5. Electronic Prototyping Laboratory
6. Engineering Workshop
7. Fluid Mechanics Laboratory
8. IoT & Embedded Systems Laboratory
9. Materials & Advance Manufacturing Process Laboratory
10. Thermodynamics Laboratory

Dedicated IT & Computing Laboratories:

1. CAD Laboratory
2. MAC Laboratory
3. Mobile App Development Laboratory
4. Software Development Laboratory
5. Electronic Computer Aided Design Laboratory

Design Studios & Workshops:

1. Design Studio
2. Drawing Studio
3. Fashion Studio
4. Macintosh Laboratory with Industry-Relevant Software
5. Material Laboratory
6. Photography Studio
7. Precision Prototyping 3D Printer
8. Precision Cutting & Engraving Laser Cutter
9. Print Workshop
10. Vacuum Forming Machine
11. Wood & Metal Workshop

Other facilities include Creative Stove which serves as a commercial outlet to nurture entrepreneurship among students and a project exhibition gallery known as White Canvas.

Hospitality & Hotel Management Facilities:

1. Café De One - Training Restaurant
2. Garde Manger (Cold Kitchen)
3. Hotel De One Front Office
4. Mock Hotel Room
5. Pastry Kitchen
6. Bar Counter
7. Training Kitchen with Individual Stations

Mass Communication Facilities:

1. Broadcasting Studio
2. Photography Studio
3. Recording Studio
4. Audio Editing Laboratory
5. Video Editing Laboratory

== Academic Programmes ==
First City University College offers industry-driven programmes in the fields of Business, Computing/IT, Design & Built Environment, Engineering, Hospitality & Hotel Management and Mass Communication.

The academic programmes are offered at Foundation, Diploma, Degree and Masters levels. All the programmes are fully accredited by the Malaysian Qualifications Agency.

All academic programmes and academic affairs are managed by the following three faculties and five centres:

- Faculty of Design & Built Environment
- Faculty of Engineering & Computing
- Faculty of Business, Hospitality & Communication
- Centre for Language & Extension Service
- Centre for General Studies
- Centre for Postgraduate Studies
- Centre for Excellence in Research & Innovation (CERI)
- Centre for Excellence in Learning & Teaching (CELT)

== Governance ==
First City University College operates under the guidance of the Senior Management, led by the Vice-Chancellor Prof. Dr. Saw Sor Heoh, collaborating closely with faculty deans and department heads.

The Board of Governors, consisting of distinguished members, oversees the affairs of First City University College:

- YBhg Tan Sri Dato’ Ir. (Dr.) Teo Chiang Kok (chairman)
- YBhg Tan Sri Dato’ (Dr.) Teo Chiang Liang (Director)
- YBhg Tan Sri Dato’ Teo Chiang Hong
- Prof. Emeritus Dr. Yong Hoi Sen
- YM. Dr. Raja Lope Bin Raja Shahrome

Academic governance is fulfilled by the Senate, chaired by the Vice-Chancellor and the Senate membership comprises the Registrar, Chief Librarian and all Faculty Deans.
