= T.K. Sabapathy =

Singaporean art historian

T. K. Sabapathy
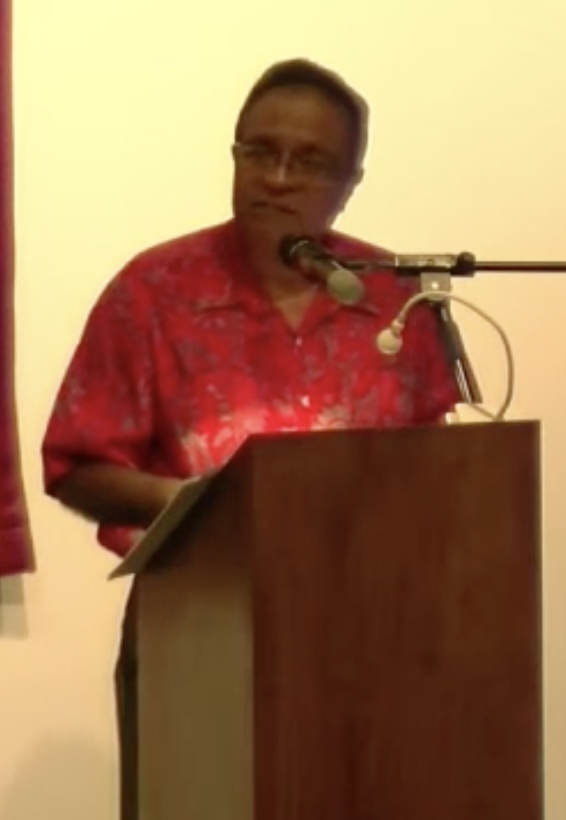
- Sabapathy in 2017
- Born: 1938 (age 87–88); Singapore, Straits Settlements
- Occupations: Art historian; curator; critic

Thiagarajan Kanaga Sabapathy (born 1938), better known as T. K. Sabapathy, is a Singaporean art historian, curator, and critic. Sabapathy has written, researched, documented, and supported contemporary visual art in Singapore and Malaysia for four decades. He has held positions at the National University of Singapore, Nanyang Technological Institution, and National Institute of Education as a lecturer of art history. Sabapathy further established and headed pioneering art research facilities in Singapore, such as the Contemporary Asian Art Centre (2001–2004) and subsequently, Asia Contemporary (2015–).

Sabapathy has written a large number of articles, books, catalogues, and artist monographs, making significant contributions to the study of art in Southeast Asia, also providing support to curatorial work at art institutions and major exhibitions.

== Education and early life ==
Sabapathy was born in 1938 in Singapore. Then, the arts scene in British Malaya was still nascent, with the visual arts receiving little interest or investment from colonial rulers. Visual art was predominantly advanced by local and migrant artists whose art practices drew upon Western watercolor and oil painting, as well as Chinese ink traditions, while art education in Singapore then and in the following decades was predominantly confined to studio-based studies.

Sabapathy is an alumnus of the Raffles Institution, where he was also a sports champion. After graduating, he enrolled in the Singapore-based University of Malaya in 1958 with history as his major. With a curiosity in art, Sabapathy took up an elective two-year undergraduate programme on the history of art, which the Faculty of Arts had only recently begun offering in the 1950s. From 1958 to 1960, Sabapathy studied art history from the British art historian, Michael Sullivan, an Asian art scholar and the curator of the first University of Malaya Art Museum who was committed to forming a representative collection of Malayan art. Though Sullivan left the university and Singapore in 1960, Sabapathy was greatly inspired by Sullivan's cause, and the two would remain in touch. In August 1962, with encouragement from Sullivan and K.G. Tregonning, Sabapathy's professor in history, he moved to San Francisco, California, enrolling in graduate studies in the history of art at the University of California, Berkeley. From 1962 to 1965, Sabapathy studied European and Asian art, the closest he could get to the study of Southeast Asian art.

After graduating in 1965, Sabapathy left California for London. There, he studied Southeast Asian Art as a research fellow at the School of Oriental and African Studies (SOAS), University of London, from 1966 to 1969.

== Career ==
=== Early teaching and writing career ===
While still a research fellow at SOAS, Sabapathy taught Asian art three days a week at the Farnham School of Art in Surrey. From 1969 to 1970, he also taught Southeast Asian sculpture at Saint Martin's School of Art, and harboured thoughts of returning to Singapore to teach art history. While in London in 1970, however, Sabapathy met the vice chancellor of the University of Singapore, the late politician Toh Chin Chye, who dismissed the university's art history programme as “unproductive” and told Sabapathy of his intention to close the facility.

The same year in 1970, Sabapathy was offered the position of art history lecturer at the newly founded Universiti Sains Malaysia in Penang, which had Malaysia's first Fine Arts degree programme. From 1971, Sabapathy relocated to Penang to teach for almost 10 years, where he delved into the research of the modern in Malaysian art and created course materials, catalogues, biographies and other texts where there were previously none. During this period, he laid foundations for the further study of modern Malayan art, and his work brought him close to the Singapore art community, given Malaysia and Singapore's long shared history as British Malaya leading in an overlap in the art of both countries. He also established a close friendship with fellow art writer and educator, the late Redza Piyadasa, with whom he co-curated exhibitions and collaborated on numerous publications. This included their famous 1979 study of Nanyang Academy of Fine Arts artists, in which they became the first to identify and define the now well-known Nanyang style of painting. In 1983, he and Piyasada, under the aegis of Dewan Bahasa dan Pustaka, an agency of the Ministry of Education Malaysia, co-authored Modern Artists of Malaysia, one of the earliest surveys on Modern art and artists in Malaysia.

In 1973, three years after the meeting in London with Toh, the art history programme and university museum set up by Sullivan and expanded by his successor William Willetts was shut down. The museum collection was divided between the newly split University of Malaya's offshoots—the University of Malaya in Kuala Lumpur and the University of Singapore, which stored its share of the collection with the National Museum of Singapore. Sabapathy's writing began in the mass media, writing for newspapers in Malaysia such as The Straits Echo before moving into the mainstream English language newspapers such as the New Straits Times and The Star in Malaysia.

=== Writing about art and teaching art history in Singapore ===
In 1980, after his contract with the Universiti Sains Malaysia ended, Sabapathy returned to Singapore with his wife and child. Sabapathy did not hope to revive the art history programme there, and instead earned a living by writing articles on art and art reviews for The Straits Times, and continued to do so until 1993.

In 1981, the head of the Department of Architecture at the National University of Singapore (NUS) invited Sabapathy to work there as a lecturer of art history, what marked the beginning of a long career as an educator in various institutions in Singapore. Besides lecturing at NUS, Sabapathy also began teaching at the Nanyang Technological University's School of Art, Design and Media in 2006. In 2007, he began lecturing at the National Institute of Education, teaching about the modern and the contemporary in the art of Southeast Asia. At each of these institutions, however, Sabapathy's programmes were often limited to introductory modules despite repeated attempts of his to have school administrators and heads recognise the importance of the study of art history as an academic major.

=== Curatorial work and support, founding of research institutions for Asian art ===
In 1989, the National Museum of Singapore returned the old university museum's collection of artefacts to the National University of Singapore, and the collection was catalogued in the early '90s. For the 2002 opening of the NUS Museum's South and Southeast Asian Art Gallery, Sabapathy co-curated the South and Southeast Asian chapter of the inaugural exhibition.

In 1994, Sabapathy was approached by the artists running 5th Passage art space to serve as their advisor. In 1996, the young curatorial team of the newly opened Singapore Art Museum (SAM) received pivotal support from Sabapathy as an art historian and scholar during the curating of the inaugural exhibition, Modernity and Beyond: Themes in Southeast Asian Art. His intellectual leadership was critical in other exhibitions such as Pago-Pago to Gelombang: 40 Years of Latiff Mohidin at the National Museum Art Gallery in 1994, as well as Thomas Yeo: A Retrospective (1997), Trimurti and Ten Years After (1998–99), and 36 Ideas from Asia: Contemporary South-East Asian Art (2002), all held at SAM.

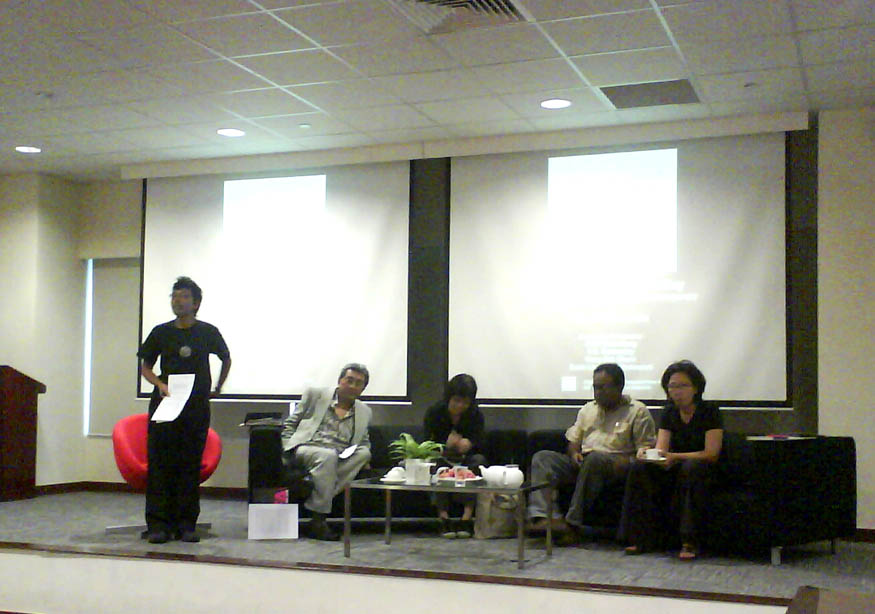
Sabapathy (second from right) at a roundtable session hosted by the Nanyang Academy of Fine Arts, 2008

In 2001, Sabapathy formed the Contemporary Asian Arts Centre (CAAC), a contemporary Asian art research facility at the LASALLE College of the Arts. From 2001 to 2004, he served as the director of the centre, which supported art and artist research projects, publications, and participation in regional art forums and symposiums. In 2004, the centre was absorbed into LASALLE when funding for the centre ran out, and Sabapathy's involvement with the centre came to an end. Sabapathy went on to establish Asia Contemporary in 2015, an independent Southeast Asian art research institute, and headed it as its founding director. The institute collaborated with artists and historians on residencies and published works.

In 2010, Sabapathy published Road to Nowhere: The Quick Rise and the Long Fall of Art History in Singapore. The book built on lectures Sabapathy had given at the National Institute of Education, which traced the academic landscape in Singapore and elsewhere. It examined in particular the teaching of the history of art in the then University of Malaya in the 1950s and its advancement in the 1960s, as well as the closure of the university museum and its art history programme in the 1970s.

=== Later work and publications ===
In 2015, at the exhibition 5 Stars: Art Reflects on Peace, Justice, Equality, Democracy and Progress at SAM, Sabapathy's work was presented alongside that of artists Ho Tzu Nyen, Matthew Ngui, Suzann Victor, and Zulkifle Mahmod. Tracing the chronology of Sabapathy's critical writings across four decades, the presentation drew on his personal collection of books and his authored texts, presenting them in an 'artifactual' manner. Sabapathy was also co-chair and Curatorial Advisor of the Singapore Biennale 2013 and 2016, and is the Curatorial Advisor to SAM.

In 2018, an anthology of Sabapathy's writings, Writing the Modern: Selected Texts on Art & Art History in Singapore, Malaysia & Southeast Asia 1973–2015, was published.

== Selected publications ==
- Sabapathy, T.K.; Piyadasa, Redza (1983). Modern Artists of Malaysia. Kuala Lumpur: Dewan Bahasa dan Pustaka, Ministry of Education Malaysia.
- Sabapathy, T.K. (1994). Pago-Pago to Gelombang: 40 Years of Latiff Mohidin. Singapore: Singapore Art Museum. ISBN 9971917416.
- Sabapathy, T.K. (1996). Modernity and Beyond: Themes in Southeast Asian Art. Singapore: Singapore Art Museum. ISBN 9810074875.
- Sabapathy, T.K. (1997). Thomas Yeo: A Retrospective. Singapore: Singapore Art Museum. ISBN 9810086695.
- Sabapathy, T.K. (2002). Past, Present, Beyond: Re-nascence of an Art Collection. Singapore: NUS Museums. ISBN 9810457758.
- Sabapathy, T.K. (2010). Road to Nowhere: The Quick Rise and the Long Fall of Art History in Singapore. Singapore: The Art Gallery, National Institute of Education. ISBN 978-9810852641.
- Sabapathy, T.K. (2012). Intersecting Histories: Contemporary Turns in Southeast Asian Art. Singapore: School of Art, Design and Media, Nanyang Technological University. ISBN 9789810741006.
- Sabapathy, T.K. (2016). About Michael Sullivan: Anniversary Lecture by T.K. Sabapathy. Singapore: NUS Museum. ISBN 9789811107733.
- Sabapathy, T.K. (2018). Ahmad, Mashadi; Lingham, Susie; Schoppert, Peter; Toh, Joyce (eds.). Writing the Modern: Selected Texts on Art & Art History in Singapore, Malaysia & Southeast Asia 1973–2015. Singapore: Singapore Art Museum. ISBN 9789811157639.
