= Amanda Heng =

Singaporean artist and curator (born 1951)

- 王良吟
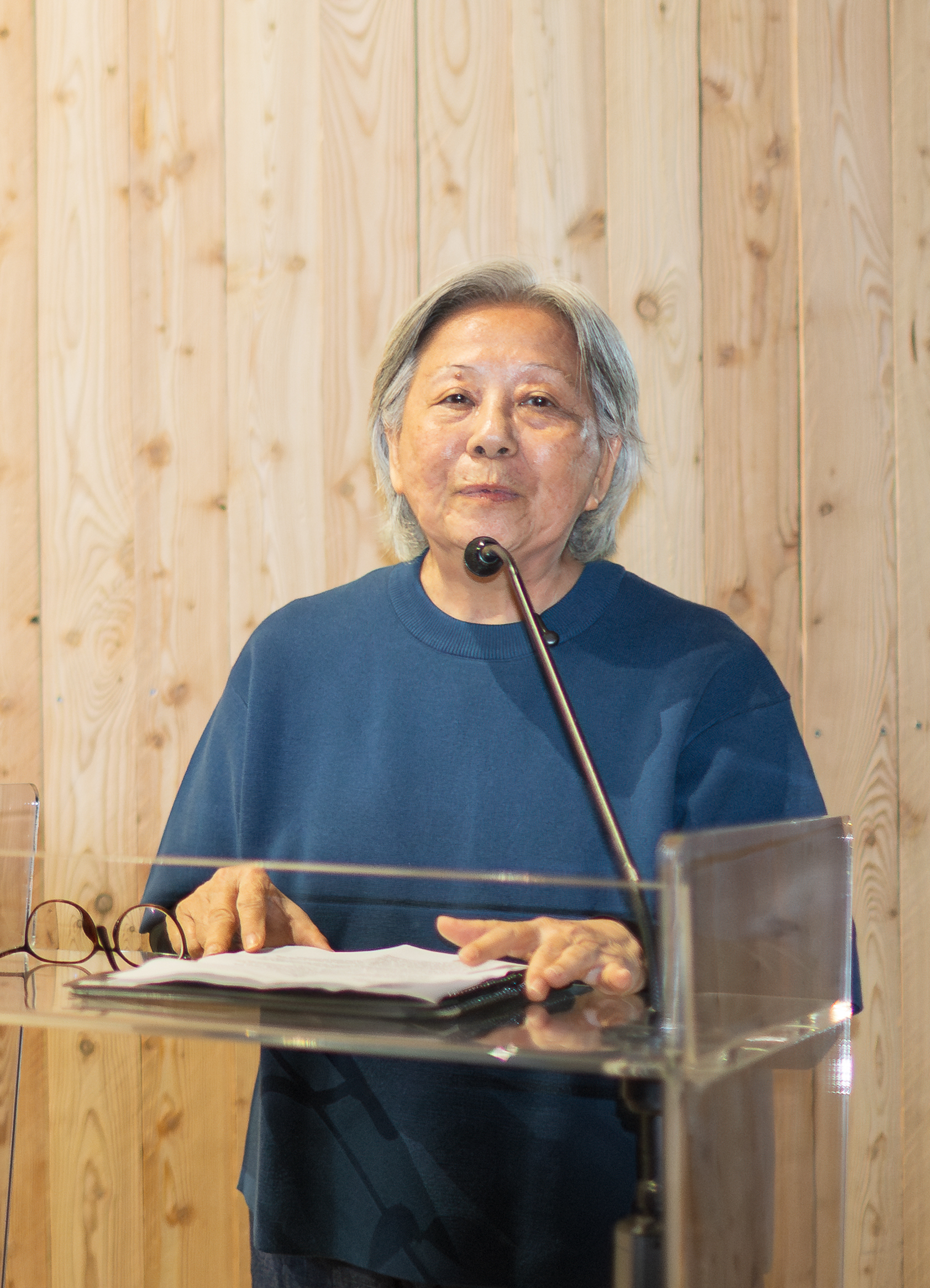
- Heng at the 61st Venice Biennale in 2026
- Born: 1951 (age 74–75); Colony of Singapore
- Education: LASALLE College of the Arts
- Occupations: Artist, curator, and lecturer
- Known for: Feminist art

Amanda Heng Liang Ngim (Chinese: 王良吟; pinyin: Wáng Liáng Yín; born 1951) is a contemporary artist, curator, and lecturer from Singapore, with a significant international presence. Known for her performance-based and process-driven works, Heng's art explores themes such as national identity, collective memory, social relationships, gender politics, and various social issues in urban contemporary society.

In 2019, she received the Benesse Prize at the Singapore Biennale. Heng is also a co-founder of The Artists' Village, an art collective established in 1988, and Women in the Arts, Singapore's first artist-run women collective, founded in 1999.

== Background ==
Heng was born in Singapore in 1951. She graduated from LASALLE College of the Arts in 1988 with a diploma in printmaking. In 1990, she conducted research on the women's liberation movement and feminist art at the Central St Martins School of Art and Design, now part of the University of the Arts London. Three years later, in 1993, she earned a Bachelor of Arts in Fine Art at Curtin University of Technology in Western Australia.

Amanda has lectured at Nanyang Technological University and the National Institute of Education. Additionally, she supervises MA students at LASALLE College of the Arts. In 2009, she served on the selection and curatorial committee for the President's Young Talents Exhibition in Singapore. She was awareded the Cultural Medallion in 2010 and held her first solo retrospective at the Singapore Art Museum (SAM) in 2011, titled "Amanda Heng: Speak To Me, Walk With Me". In 2014, Heng featured in the TV series A Journey Through Asian Art.

== Feminist work ==
Heng introduced feminist discourse to the local art scene through provocative performance works addressing gender inequality and social identity. This was notable, especially after performance art gained notoriety following a 1994 performance by Josef Ng, where he snipped his pubic hair at the 5th Passage art space in Parkway Parade Shopping Centre. Following the negative reception of the work, the National Arts Council of Singapore suspended all funding for performance art. When Heng moved into the NAC's newly converted studios in 1997, she was required to sign an agreement prohibiting the use of the studio for performance.

Despite these challenges, Heng founded the collective Women in the Arts (WITA) in 1999, aimed at advancing the feminist art movement. She utilized her studio as a venue for performances and other media. WITA became the first artists-run women's collective in Singapore and organized forums such as Women and Their Arts, The 1st Asian Film Appreciation Workshop, Women About Women, Memories of Sense, TheFridayEvent, Exchange 05, and Open Ends. WITA currently maintains an archive of women in the Arts in Singapore. Heng's work sought to instigate conversations about women's artistic practices at a time when a feminist framework was virtually non-existent in Singapore.

Her artistic endeavors also include co-directing the theatre production "Bernard's Story" and performing in "A Woman On the Tree in the Hill," directed by Ivan Heng of The Wild Rice Theatre Company.

== Notable artworks ==
She and Her Dishcover (1991)

She and Her Dishcover is an installation featuring a table, table cover, mirror and dish cover. In this work, Heng explores the interplay between the words "dishcover" and "discover," while examining the preconceived roles of women in the domestic sphere.

Missing (1994)

Missing (1994) is an installation responding to the issue of female infanticide in cultures that value male offspring over females. The installation features several baby girls' dresses suspended from fishing lines and hooks, along with black cloths, a black sofa, a table, and a doorframe. This work serves as a commemoration of nameless female infants who fall victim to this practice, while also examining gender issues within the Asian context, where baby girls are often devalued and wives are pressured to produce male heirs. The installation invites the audience to take notes containing the artist's reflections, which are attached to red strings.

S/HE (1994)

S/HE (1994) is a performance work that questions the role of women within the cultural and political context of Singapore. Heng explores how power is embedded in influences that continually encroach upon personal identity. In this performance, the artist makes symbolic marks on her face while speaking questions and Confucian sayings in front of a mirror, deconstructing language to its simplest phonemes and strokes. This process breaks down meaning in search of new forms of expression. Heng incorporates domestic objects, such as baking dough, washing detergent, and toy alphabets, while the audience is seated and standing around the performance space. S/HE was performed again in 1995 and 1996, evolving with the artist's appropriation of language, text, symbols, images, memories, Chinese classical music, and Western choral singing.

Tiger Balls, Myths and Chinese Man (1991)

Tiger Balls, Myths and Chinese Man (1991) is an installation featuring basketballs painted with tiger stripes, arranged on a traditional Chinese wedding blanket. During a media tour of her work, the artist explained that the installation was a response to a sexist comment made about women, following fellow contemporary artist Tang Da Wu's installation, Tiger's Whip, in 1991. Tang's work depicted the practice of Chinese men consuming tiger penises as an aphrodisiac, which led to the comment attributing the issue to women's expectations.

Let's Chat (1996)

Let's Chat (1996) is a performance piece that invites members of the public to sit and chat with Heng at a table while drinking tea and cleaning bean sprouts together. This interaction references the simpler lifestyle associated with traditional kampong life. The work was first presented at The Substation in Singapore and later expanded to local shopping malls, markets, and various communities overseas.

Another Woman (1996–97)

Another Woman (1996–97) is a photography and mixed-media installation created in collaboration with Heng's mother. The work highlights the sense of displacement experienced by dialect-speaking, kampong-bred women, like her mother, as a consequence of "nation-building," reflecting on the erosion of their social identity as "another woman." This installation was showcased at The First Fukuoka Asian Triennial in 1999 and is featured in episode two of the TV series A Journey Through Asian Art.

Let's Walk (1999)

Let's Walk (1999) is a series of street performances that response to the survival of beauty businesses during the 1997 Asian financial crisis. In this performance, Amanda and members of the public walked backward with high-heeled shoes in their mouths, using handheld mirrors to navigate. These performances were presented in various locations, including Singapore, Japan, Paris, Poland, Indonesia, Sweden, and Spain.

Yours Truly, My Body (1999)

Yours Truly, My Body (1999) is a work in which the artist scrubs a slab of pig meat with blood, commenting on the pain women endure in their pursuit of beauty through cosmetic surgery.

Narrating Bodies (1999–2000)

Narrating Bodies (1999–2000) is an installation and performance that utilizes both old and new photographs, as well as reconstructed images. The artist enlarged old photos using laser printing and rephotographed them with her current self. Through this process, she sought to uncover evidence of connection between her mother and herself, exploring themes of memory, reconnection, and the reconstruction of their relationship. This work was presented at the Third Asia-Pacific Triennial of Contemporary Art in September 1999 at the Queensland Art Gallery in Brisbane, Australia.

Home Service (2003)

Home Service (2003) features the artist performing the role of a domestic worker, cleaning the homes of Singaporeans. This work highlights the challenges faced by domestic workers in contemporary Singapore.

Water is Politics (2003)

Water is Politics (2003) is a performance in which Heng utilizes large basins of water and money. Developed during her residency in Sri Lanka, this work serves as a commentary on the ongoing tensions between Singapore and Malaysia regarding water supply.

Our Lives in Our Hands (2007)

Our Lives in Our Hands (2007) highlights the social issues surrounding the migration of thousands of foreign laborers who build the city yet endure poor living conditions and neglect from their employers and the broader Singaporean society.

Singirl (1999–2026)

Singirl is an online project featuring photographs of the bare bottoms of female participants aged eighteen and older, presented in a scrolling parade on the website. This work serves as a counterpoint to the image of the "Singapore Girl," a branding concept created by Singapore Airlines, and challenges conventional beauty standards and perceptions of the body. The project can be accessed at https://singirl.online/. As of May 2026, the site can no longer be accessed due to its domain expiring.
