= The Substation =

Independent contemporary arts centre in Singapore

Coordinates: 1.294606°N 103.849259°E

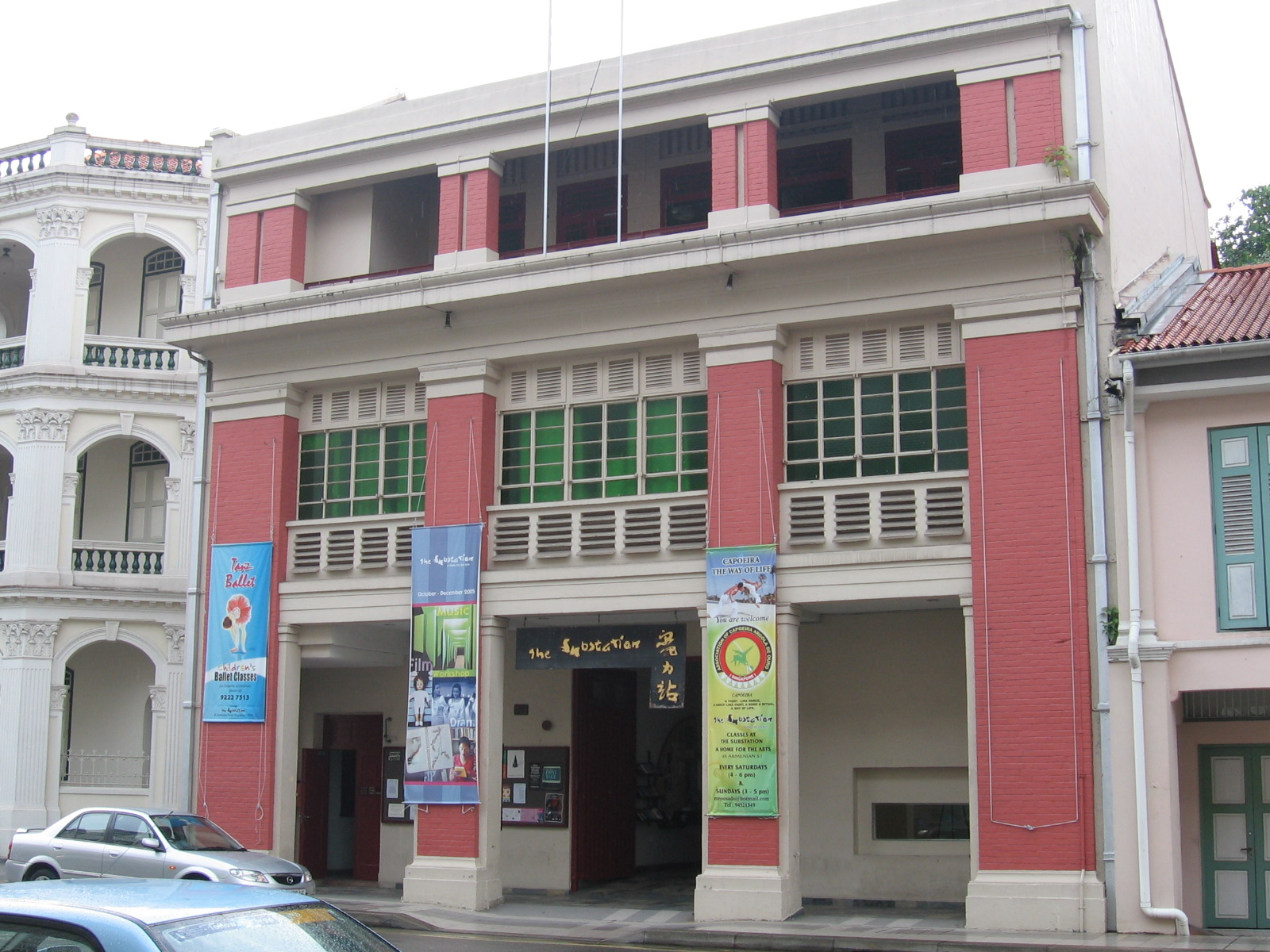
The Substation

The Substation (Chinese: 电力站) is Singapore's first independent contemporary arts centre. It was founded in 1990 by Kuo Pao Kun. The Substation is centrally located in the city's civic district and was the first building under the National Arts Council's "Arts Housing Scheme". It officially opened on 16 September 1990. The Substation is a non-profit organisation and registered Institution of Public Character in Singapore, which relies on financial and in-kind support from the general public, commercial organisations and government ministries to cover the costs of operating and developing arts & educational programmes. As an arts centre, The Substation closed in 2021 and has since transformed into an arts collective called "The Substation 2.0".

== History ==
The site of The Substation, as its name suggests, was previously a power sub-station. The building dates from 1926. In 1950 the Public Utilities Board added a garden to house outdoor equipment. The sub-station ended its operations in the late 1970s and the building was left vacant.

Throughout the 1980s, there was a consistent and unprecedented increase in government investment in the arts, an emergence of many art activities and capacities initiated by artists and art groups and a dramatic increase of global interest in the arts from Asia and Southeast Asia. Against such a backdrop, the Ministry of Community Development (which then included the arts and culture portfolio) explored ways to develop arts and culture in Singapore in the 1990s. In 1986, dramatist Kuo Pao Kun and Practice Performing Arts sent in a proposal for the conversion of the disused building to an arts center. It was accepted. Also in 1986, the building, together with the adjacent Tao Nan School (now the Peranakan Museum) and the shophouses along Armenian Street (now used by National Heritage Board), were earmarked for conservation under the Urban Redevelopment Authority's Civic and Cultural Master Plan.

In 1989, the MCD officially invited Practice Performing Arts Centre Ltd to manage The Substation and put up funding of $1.07m for the building's renovation. In June 1990, the interior fittings and equipment installation works were undertaken, and The Substation officially opened on 16 September 1990.

In the first five years of The Substation's history, under the visionary artistic direction of founder Kuo Pao Kun, The Substation was a pioneer arts space in Singapore and was a site for experimentation of all the art forms, especially since there were so few spaces for the arts in that period, let alone spaces for the more experimental arts. Any of the artists who worked with The Substation in the early days were attempting things that were unprecedented in the history of modern arts and culture in Singapore. Even as a venue, The Substation had a significance back then that has since been superseded: then, up-and-coming groups like The Necessary Stage (TNS), one of the most prominent arts groups in Singapore today, staged their plays at The Substation’s Guinness Theatre or in the Garden. The Substation’s founding coincided with a burst of activity in Singapore such as the emergence of professional theatre companies, new writing in theatre, and a new generation of visual artists inspired by new practices and ideas promoted by artists and groups such as The Artists Village (TAV).

The first multi-disciplinary, thematic events were held at The Substation. This included The Tree Celebration, which featured installations, mime performances, theatre performances, readings, and Pao Kun's "Memories" seasons, which explored tradition and heritage from a personal point of view, through art. The "Memories" seasons developed into The Substation's annual festival SeptFest which was notable for the seminal arts conferences that brought together artists, critics, cultural commentators, civil society activists, and the public.

The Substation was part of a trend in the Singapore arts scene when "new" things were emerging. From the beginning, The Substation received critical acclaim because it gave instrumental support to independent artists and arts groups like Zai Kuning and Theatre Ox, opening up a space for such practices. The first arts conference held at The Substation in 1993, "Art vs Art" brought together many of Singapore's important artists, academics, critics and arts administrators; members of the public were also key participants in this weekend event. The feeling among those who participated was that this bringing together of such diverse people to discuss the arts and the place of the arts in Singapore society was something new, and that it was a special moment in local arts history.

Under The Substation's second artistic director T. Sasitharan, The Substation entered a more mature phase as an institution as it started the process of institution-building, as its management and financial systems were consolidated, and as the arts scene became more professional and government investment in arts and culture increased. Programs at The Substation were streamlined, international and regional networks expanded, and artists encouraged to develop rigour in their practices and approaches to art. Platforms started under Pao Kun's leadership – Dance Space, Music Space, Raw Theatre – developed into important showcases for new artistic work in Singapore, through artist commissions. The Moving Images film programme was set up in 1997 with the aim of nurturing Singapore – and later, South East Asian – filmmakers and growing a regional film community. During this period, The Substation continued its support for independent artists by setting up an artist-in-residence programme in line with its original mission to persevering and supporting the development of independent artists into their maturity. However, The Substation faced considerable difficulty in supplying financial resources for the resident artists' stipends because what most funding bodies and corporate sponsors wanted to support was a final product not the process of experimentation that was a great part of The Substation's focus.

In line with an increasing global interest in "Asian" contemporary arts, The Substation continues to be crucial for Singapore arts and culture. It functions as an incubator of new artistic work, artistic practices, and artists and as a gathering point for the arts community the public. The Substation continues to be a place where young artists and arts groups can have their start and as a space for critical discussion that allows for experimentation. The Substation is to educate a new, young generation about The Substation and the value of maintaining this open space for diverse voices, languages, opinions, and artistic practices in Singapore.

The centre is scheduled to move out of its premises in July 2021 and the premises will be converted into a new centre for multiple arts groups. While the Substation is invited back to be a co-tenant after the renovation, the Substation's board decided against it and permanently closing the center.

== Location ==
The Substation is located on 45 Armenian Street, Singapore, in the heart of the civic district. Its nearest MRT stations are City Hall, Bras Basah and Clarke Quay stations. The site of The Substation was a previously power sub-station until the 1970s. The building dates from 1926.

== Facilities ==
The Substation's venues include a black box theatre, a gallery, a dance studio, Random Room and two multi-function classrooms.

=== Box office ===
The Substation Box Office is located at the ground floor foyer of The Substation.

=== Theatre ===
The Substation Theatre is a flexible black-box performance space. It has a seating capacity for 120 people, with 108 retractable seats, and can accommodate 200 people standing. It hosts both high-profile, and small independent arts events, ranging from the Singapore Short Film Awards to gigs by local musicians, and performances by numerous local and international performing artists.

=== Gallery ===
The Substation Gallery measures 113 square metres and can hold 100 people for a standing reception. It displays contemporary visual, performance and sound art.

=== Dance Studio ===
The Substation's Dance Studio is 135 square metres (13.5m x 10.5m and has a maximum capacity of 40 people and is used for rehearsals, small performances and classes like Yoga, Capoeira, Aikido and Contemporary Dance.

=== Classrooms ===
The Substation has two classrooms on the second floor. Each classroom is 30 square meters (6m x 6m) and can comfortably accommodate 20 seated people. They are suitable for meetings, classes, talks, and performances.

=== Garden ===
In the early 1990s, many young musicians started out by playing in The Substation Garden. The Garden was a haven for local bands, especially indie, rock and metal bands whose brand of "loud" music was not always appreciated by the mainstream back then. The first 24-Hour Round the Clock at The Sub Music Festival was held on 31 Dec 1990 in the Garden and the Substation's "countdown gigs" have gone down in the annals of local music as legendary events.

The Garden was also home to a wide range of performances. Among the notable ones were Pao Kun's The Tree Celebration and The Silly Little Girl and The Funny Old Tree. Other memorable "outdoor" plays staged include "The Mahabharata Part I: The Game of Dice", presented in 1995 by William Teo and his company Asia-in-Theatre Research Centre. The Necessary Stage ("Blue Remembered Hills"), Priyalatha Arun ("Marudhy"), Khairuddin Hori/ Naga Naga ("Wailol"), and World-in-Theatre ("Ramayana, The Royal Hunt of the Sun") also staged productions in the Garden.

Today, many groups prefer to use The Substation Theatre rather the Garden for various reasons, including not having to worry about the possibility of rain. The Substation Garden is now used by Timbre Bar and Bistro.

== Programmes ==
The Substation hosts and co-hosts a large number of programmes, courses and events in its premises. The Substation holds events that are designed, curated and presented by The Substation or other organisations without any curatorial or artistic assistance from The Substation. The latter type of events may qualify for rental subsidies, as part of The Substation's mission to support the arts.

This section highlights some of The Substation's core programmes.

=== Moving Images ===
The Substation's Moving Images is Singapore's first year-round programme dedicated exclusively to independent and short films. Established in 1997, Moving Images is known for its diverse and innovative programming focusing on experimental films, shorts, and documentaries, nurturing local and Asian filmmakers and connecting them internationally by giving them learning opportunities, exposure and dialogue with peers. The Singapore Short Film Awards and the Experimental Film Forum were first hosted in 2010, while the Singapore Indie Doc Fest and First Take were first launched in 2004. The Substation also collaborated with National Museum Singapore Cinematheque and the Singapore Film Commission to organise the Singapore Short Cuts film programme (2004), featuring key works in Singapore’s film canon such as Ho Tzu Nyen’s Utama: Every Name in History is I (2003) and Tan Pin Pin’s 80km/h.

=== Open call // Visual, performance and sound art ===
The Substation Open Call was first initiated in 2008 as a visual arts platform to support and realise strong artistic, critical and rigorous visual arts proposals. Open Call serves as a platform for showcasing the work of emerging artists in the local contemporary art scene and for identifying and supporting the work of promising artistic talents. In 2010, Open Call expanded to include an incubation programme for performance art. The Substation introduced a sound art component in 2011.

=== Music ===
The Substation started to develop its music programming in 2010. The Tribal Gathering music programme was initiated with the series Tribal Gathering of Tongue Tasters, hosted monthly in alternate quarters, which brings together sound, visual and performance art. The first Tribal Gathering of Jaw Benders, an annual music festival, was held at the end of 2011.

=== Literary art ===
Literary Art at The Substation has included events which debate and discuss novels, plays, and art criticism. The Substation's Love Letters postcard project was initiated in 2009, and is ongoing. It brings together a large number of writers of different ethnic, sexual and linguistic backgrounds to write poems around the theme of love, loss and longing. The Substation has also commissioned and published a number of publications, including works of fiction. The latest novel, Several Islands, was published in 2011.

=== Associate artist research programme ===
The Substation's Associate Artist Research Programme (AARP) is a two-year residency programme where selected art practitioners are provided with curatorial, financial, administrative and operational support to develop individual interdisciplinary art research and practice at The Substation. The programme replaces the previous Associate Artist Scheme first initiated in early 2002, an in-house artist-incubation programme that included Tan Pin Pin, Royston Tan, Zai Kuning and George Chua as Associate Artists.

The Associate Artist Research Programme aims to support and promote critical and sustainable research, development and discourse in contemporary art and interdisciplinary practice in Singapore. For the inaugural cycle (2011–2013), The Substation has invited Bani Haykal, Grace Tan (kwodrent), Ming Poon, and vertical submarine to be The Substation's Associate Artists. Throughout the two-year residency, each artist will present performances-lectures, workshops, exhibitions and performances during different stages of the research.

The programme is supported by The National Arts Council of Singapore and the Lee Foundation.

=== SeptFest ===
The Substation celebrates its anniversary annually on 16 September. The SeptFest arts festival was created as a month-long celebration of performance, visual, sound, filmic and literary art. Traditionally, the Open Call events are staged during this period, and are often accompanied by specially commissioned events, conferences, seminars, exhibitions and parties.

=== Learn* ===
Learn* consists of four individual public education and arts appreciation programmes available to Primary and Secondary schools. The programmes aim to instill and nurture critical thinking and creativity in young minds. The four programmes – Contemporary Theatre and Performance, Contemporary Visual Arts, Journey Towards Contemporary Art: Learning and Understanding, and Urban Artology – Reassessing Street Art – were specifically designed to expose and instill a greater awareness of the history, development and artistic techniques of contemporary art forms, while emphasising local artists and art practices.

== Courses and workshops ==
The Substation also holds a wide variety of courses and workshops on its premises.

== Queer activities ==
The Substation has been at the forefront of queer-rights activities since the early 1990s. People Like Us (abbreviation: P.L.U.) was a pioneering gay-activist group that began as a small discussion group in 1993. Its main objective was to build a sense of gay-consciousness in Singapore and the group held monthly forums and meetings at The Substation on Sundays. Many who came to the forum half-expected to be arrested, as individuals from the Internal Security Department and the police had questioned the group’s organisers and attendees about the nature of the meetings. After a gestation of three years, the book People Like Us: Sexual Minorities in Singapore (ed. Joseph Lo and Huang Guoqin; Select Publishing) was launched by P.L.U. at Select Books in March 2003, featuring papers presented at two closed-door forums that Joseph Lo organised in 1999 at The Substation. The book also contained essays contributed by others on diverse topics, such as the representation of homosexuality in theatre, gay interracial relationships, and Christianity. The 1990s was a tense time for gay-activism in Singapore, and The Substation played an important part in its development through the work of P.L.U.. Since then, The Substation has also helped to host the yearly Short Circuit queer film-screening, featuring works by gay filmmakers from Singapore. Held once every year since 2007, the most recent segment of Short Circuit took place on 6 Jan 2012 at The Substation Theatre, organised by filmmakers He Shuming and Boo Junfeng. The event was completely sold out.
