= National Museum of Singapore =

Public museum in Singapore

- Chinese: 新加坡国家博物馆; Malay: Muzium Negara Singapura; Tamil: சிங்கப்பூரின் தேசிய அருங்காட்சியகம்
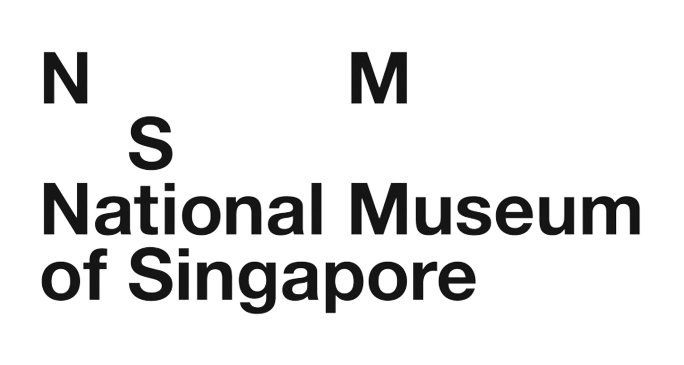

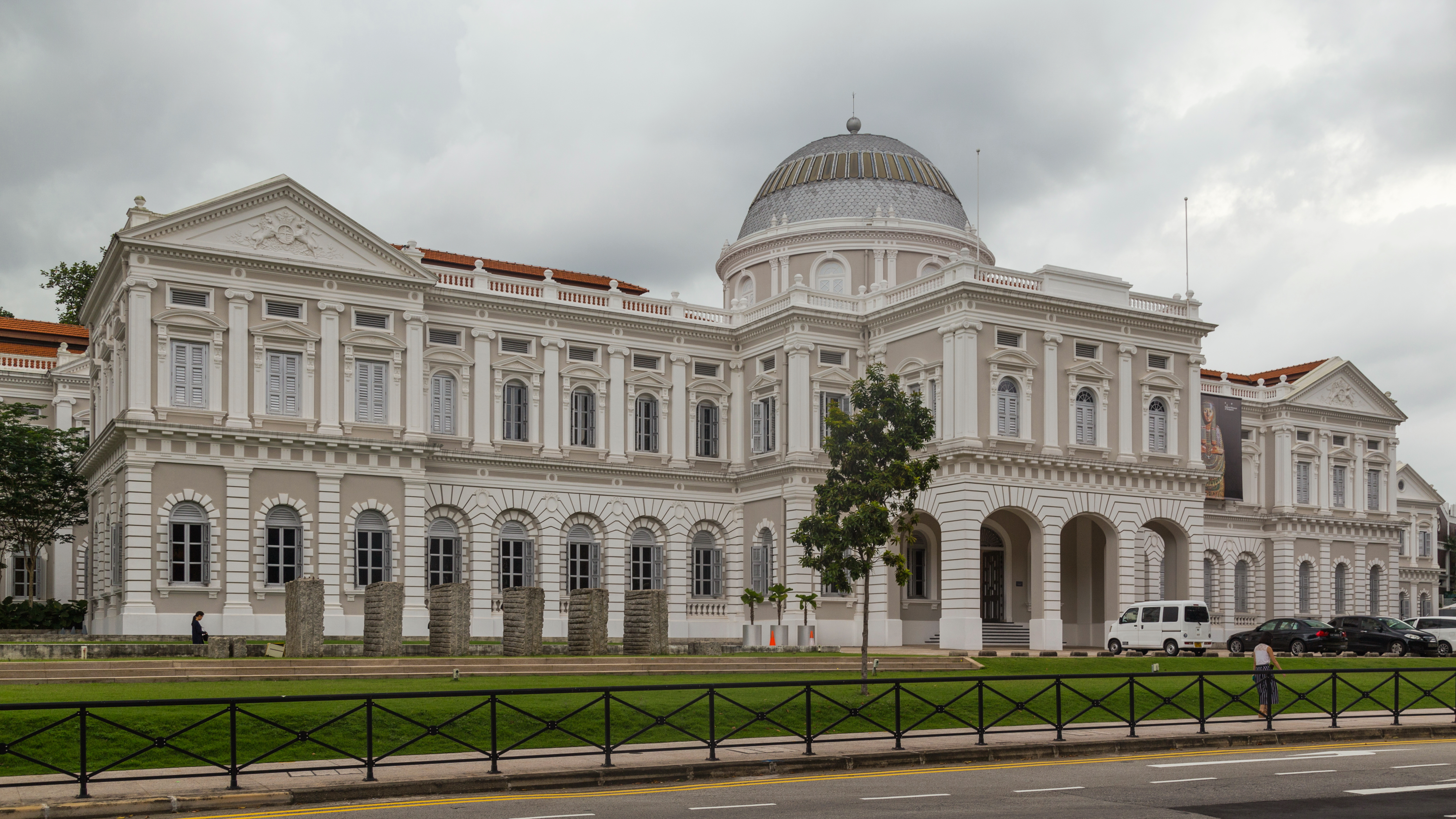
- Entrance to the National Museum of Singapore
- Former name: The Raffles Library and Museum
- Established: 1887; 139 years ago
- Location: 93 Stamford Road, Singapore 178897
- Coordinates: 1°17′48.2″N 103°50′55.1″E
- Type: History Museum
- Accreditation: National Heritage Board
- Director: Chung May Khuen
- Architects: Henry McCallum (Note: Original version); J. F. McNair (Note: Scaled down version of McCallum's and one that was eventually constructed); W Architects and I.M. Pei (Note: Redevelopment)
- Public transit access: CC2 Bras Basah; DT21 Bencoolen
- Website: www.nhb.gov.sg/nationalmuseum/

National monument of Singapore
- Designated: 14 February 1992; 34 years ago
- Reference no.: 30

The National Museum of Singapore is a public museum dedicated to Singaporean art, culture and history. Located within the country's Civic District at the Downtown Core area, it is the oldest museum in the country, with its history dating back to when it was first established in 1849, starting out as a section of a library at the Singapore Institution (Note: Now known as the Raffles Institution.) as the Raffles Library and Museum.

After several relocations over the next few decades, the museum moved to its current permanent site at Stamford Road in 1887. Between 1993 and March 2006, it was briefly known as the Singapore History Museum, before it subsequently returned to its present name that was first given in 1965. The museum preserves and interprets Singapore's social history, exploring the key events and people that have shaped the nation.

It is one of six national museums in the country; the other five being the two Asian Civilisations Museums at Empress Place Building and Old Tao Nan School respectively, the Singapore Art Museum, Peranakan Museum as well as the National Gallery Singapore. The National Museum of Singapore is also one of the country's national monuments, having been designated as such in 1992 by the National Heritage Board. The National Museum of Singapore exhibits sculptures, objets d'art, paintings, drawings, and archaeological finds. Admission to the National Museum of Singapore is complimentary for Singaporean citizens and permanent residents.

== History ==
The museum was established in 1849 by the then Singapore Institution Committee, and is the oldest museum in Singapore, hence its 19th century exterior design. Upon establishment, it was known as the Raffles Library and Museum, starting out as a section of a library at the Singapore Institution (Note: Now known as the Raffles Institution.) before moving to 93 Stamford Road in 1887 after several relocations, where it is currently located. The museum was designated a National Monument of Singapore on 14 February 1992 by the National Heritage Board. Between 1993 and March 2006, it was known as the Singapore History Museum, before it subsequently returned to its present name that was first given in 1965 as the National Museum of Singapore.

Over the decades, the National Museum of Singapore has expanded and undergone various expansions and renovations, with a three-and-a-half-year restoration that was completed on 2 December 2006, and was officially reopened on 7 December 2006 by President of Singapore S. R. Nathan and the Minister for Information, Communications and the Arts Lee Boon Yang. Its most recent restoration and upgrading works began in September 2023 with staggered gallery closures, and is slated for a full reopening in October 2026. The museum remains open in the meantime with exhibitions and programmes.

== Collection ==
In 2019, Tang Holdings donated a large collection of Sir Stamford Raffles memorabilia, including 46 holograph letters and his book The History of Java, to the museum.

In 2022, seats from Singapore Airlines's first Airbus A380 were added to the museum's collection. In 2023, a Solari board previously used at Changi Airport's Terminal 2 was added. In 2024, a 1970s Nanyang coffee roasting machine and a 1979 Housing and Development Board lift were added. In the same year, some parts from a decommissioned 1995 SMRT Siemens C651 train that served the North–South and East–West lines (NSEWL) until 2024, such as train doors, seats and map displays were also added to its collection.

== Singapore History Gallery ==
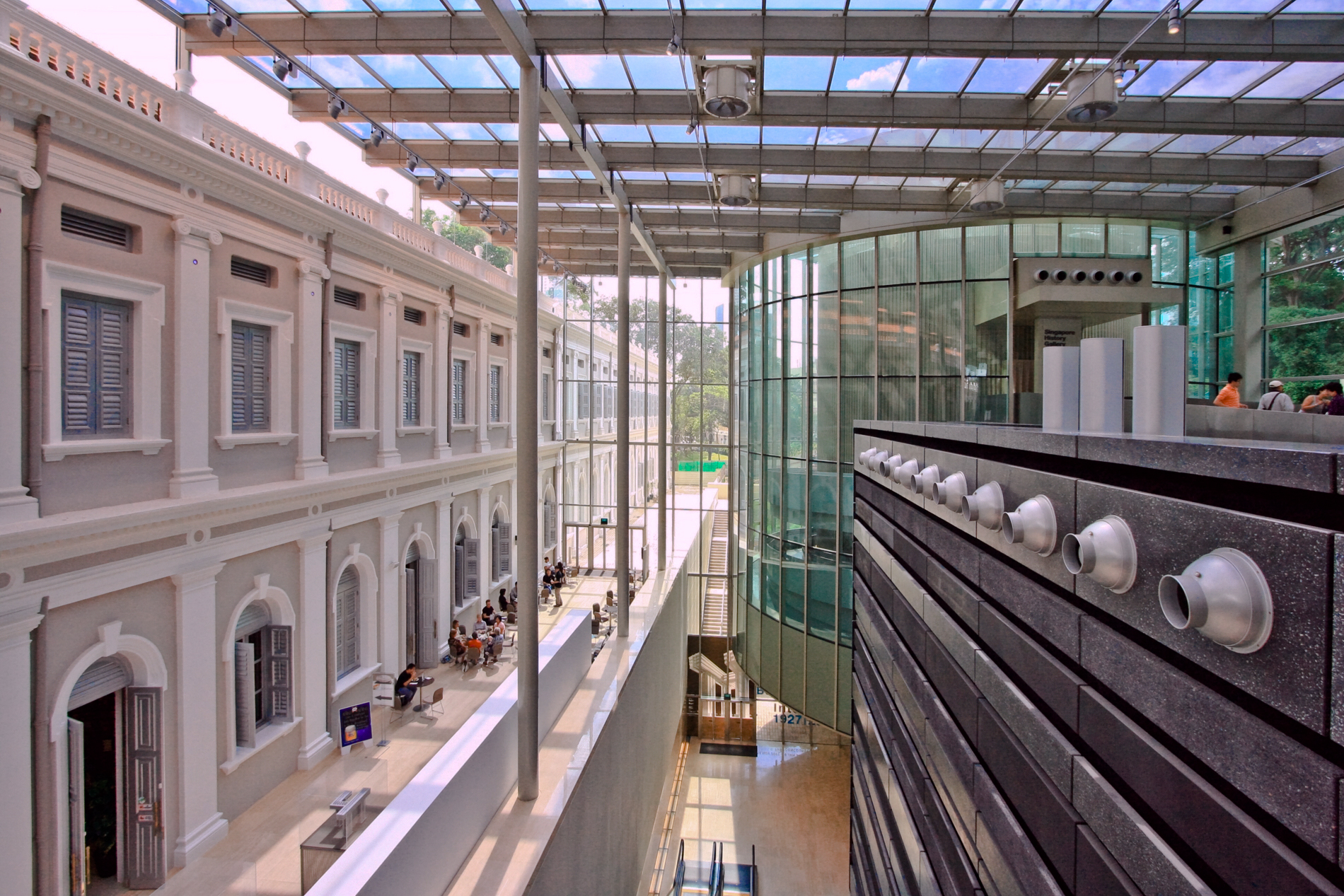
The gallery's former entrance on level 2

The Singapore History Gallery is a 2,800-square-metre (30,000 sq ft) gallery located within the museum. The gallery adopts a story-telling approach, unveiling different perspectives through tales of the past.

The Singapore History Gallery closed for restoration works in November 2025. It will reopen with a new experience in October 2026.

When visitors walk into the gallery's main entrance on level 1, they are welcomed by multimedia projections of a map of Singapore from 1700s made by a European traveller who navigated the world in that century.

The exhibits that are found in the gallery are found below:

- Sejarah Singapura
- Founding in 1819 (1800 - 1825)
- Straits Settlements (1825 - 1867)
- Crown Colony (1867 - 1941)
- Battle of Singapore (1941 - 1942)
- Japanese Occupation (1942 - 1945)
- Post-War Period (1945 - 1949)
- Self-Governance (1950s)
- Merger (1963 - 1964)
- Independence (1960s & 1970s)
- Modern Developments (1980s & 1990s)
- Singapore Millennium (2000 - 2015)
- The Future Singapore (which is after SG50)
- In Memoriam: Lee Kuan Yew

=== Battle of Singapore and Japanese Occupation ===
Well before World War II began, the British had developed the “Singapore strategy” to defend the British empire in Asia. In Singapore, they built a naval base at Sembawang, strengthened the air force and installed large 15-inch coastal guns. Singapore became known as the “Gibraltar of the East” or “Fortress Singapore”.

At the same time, the outbreak of the Second Sino-Japanese War in 1937 stirred up the Chinese community in Singapore. They formed “patriotic” organisations, which raised funds for China’s war effort and organised boycotts of Japanese goods and businesses.

On 8 December 1941, Singapore experienced war for the first time when the Japanese bombed the city. On the same day, Japanese troops landed on the northeast coast of Malaya and began their invasion. After a swift 70-day campaign, the Japanese – to almost everyone’s surprise – defeated the British and occupied the Malay Peninsula and Singapore.

The British surrendered on 15 February 1942. Singapore was placed under military occupation and renamed Syonan-To (“Light of the South” in Japanese). While the war continued elsewhere, the Singapore population struggled with food and fuel shortages, disease and, at its worst, violence and harassment from the Japanese. The occupation ended only when Japan surrendered to the Allies in 1945.

=== Independence ===
In February 2012, the Toh Chin Chye's exhibit (which is Deputy Prime Minister and the Singapore flag) was also added into the Singapore History Gallery.

=== Modern Developments ===
Modern Developments showcases the brief history including the late 1990s, at least where Ng Pei Seng placed his D&T semi-preserved exhibit, that is from 1999.

=== Singapore Millennium ===
Singapore Millennium also showcases the PSI readings in the year 2006, 2010, 2013 and 2014 due to the Southeast Asian haze.

=== In Memoriam: Lee Kuan Yew ===
In Memoriam: Lee Kuan Yew is an exhibit dedicated for the late Lee Kuan Yew, who had died on 23 March 2015. The exhibits will include the following:

- Lee Kuan Yew's barrister robe
- Rolex Oyster Perpetual watch
- Two of the late Lee Kuan Yew's jackets
- Charcoal and ink drawing of Lee Kuan Yew
- A desk that Lee Kuan Yew worked over the years red briefcase for local use

== Gallery ==
The museum, c. 1900

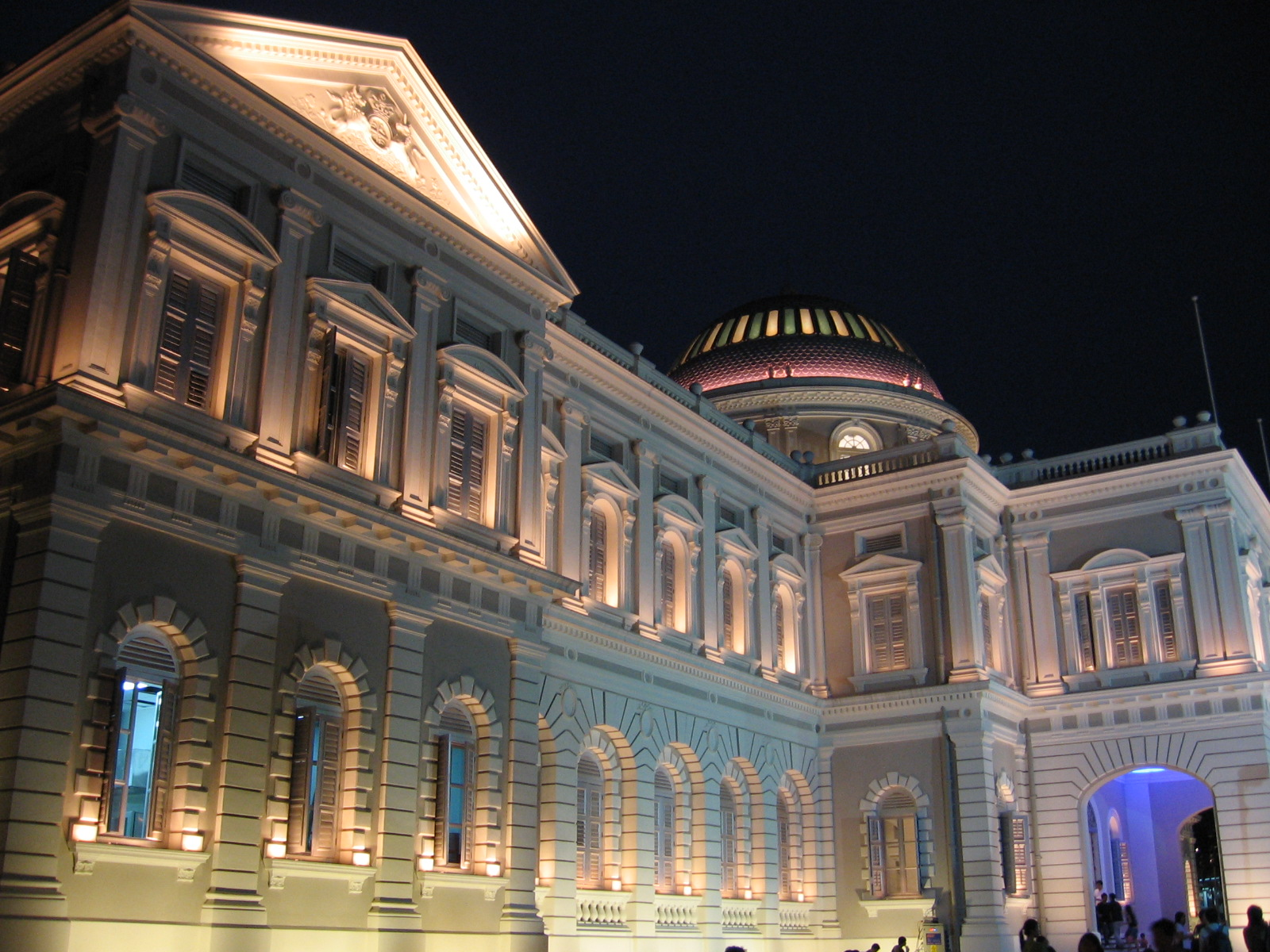
The eastern wing of the museum at night

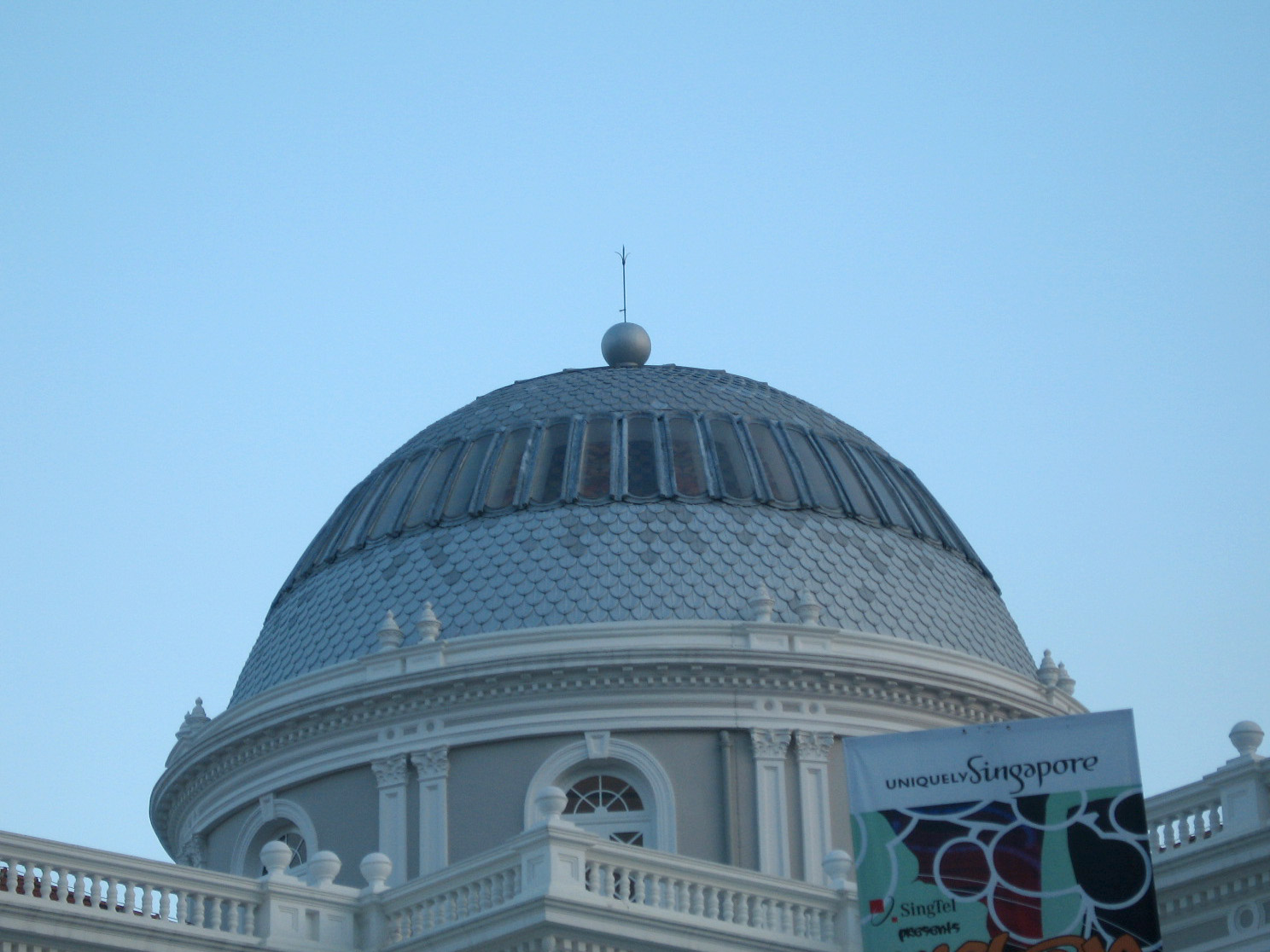
The museum's dome consists of 3,000 zinc fish-scaled tiles and stained glass panels

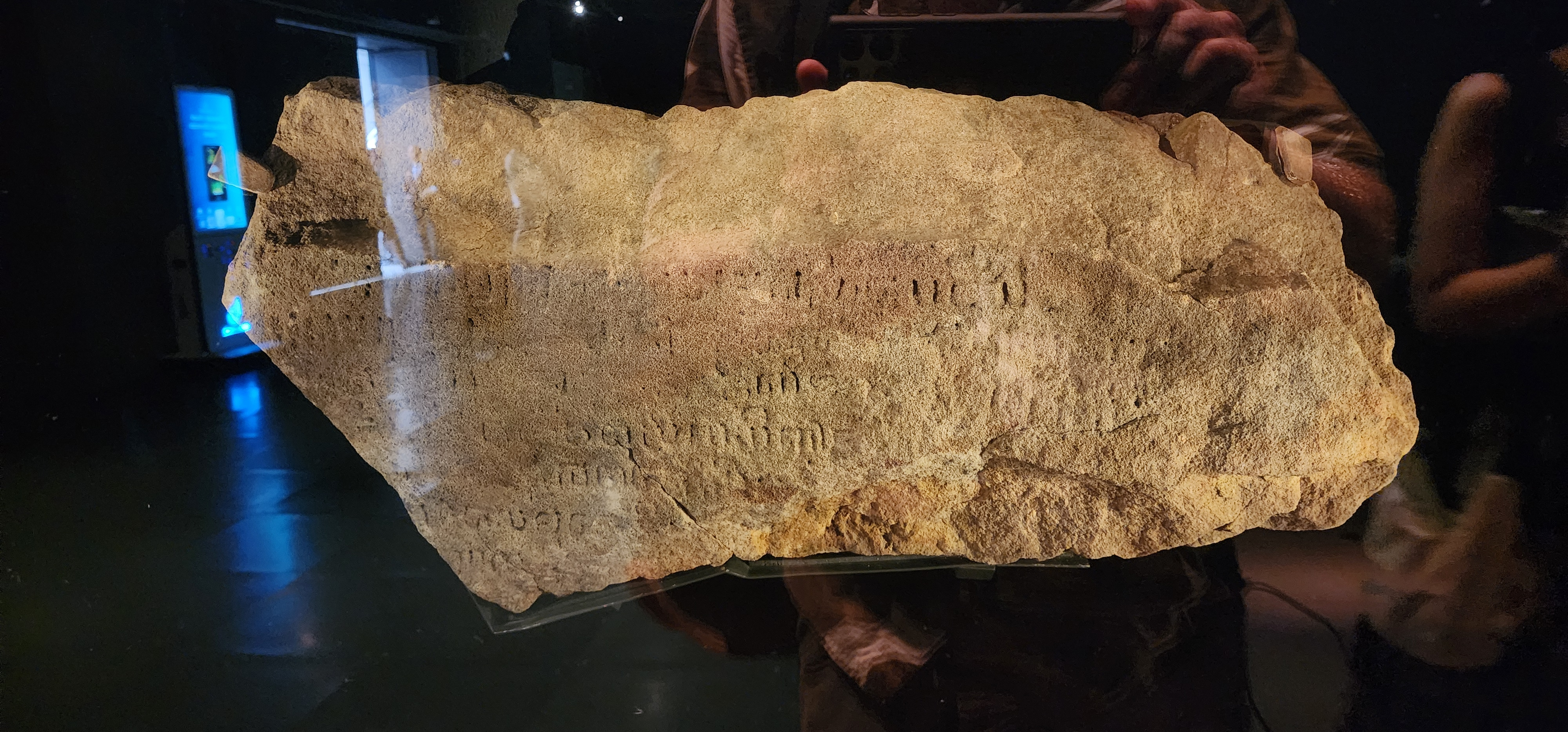
The Singapore Stone, 10th to 14th centuries

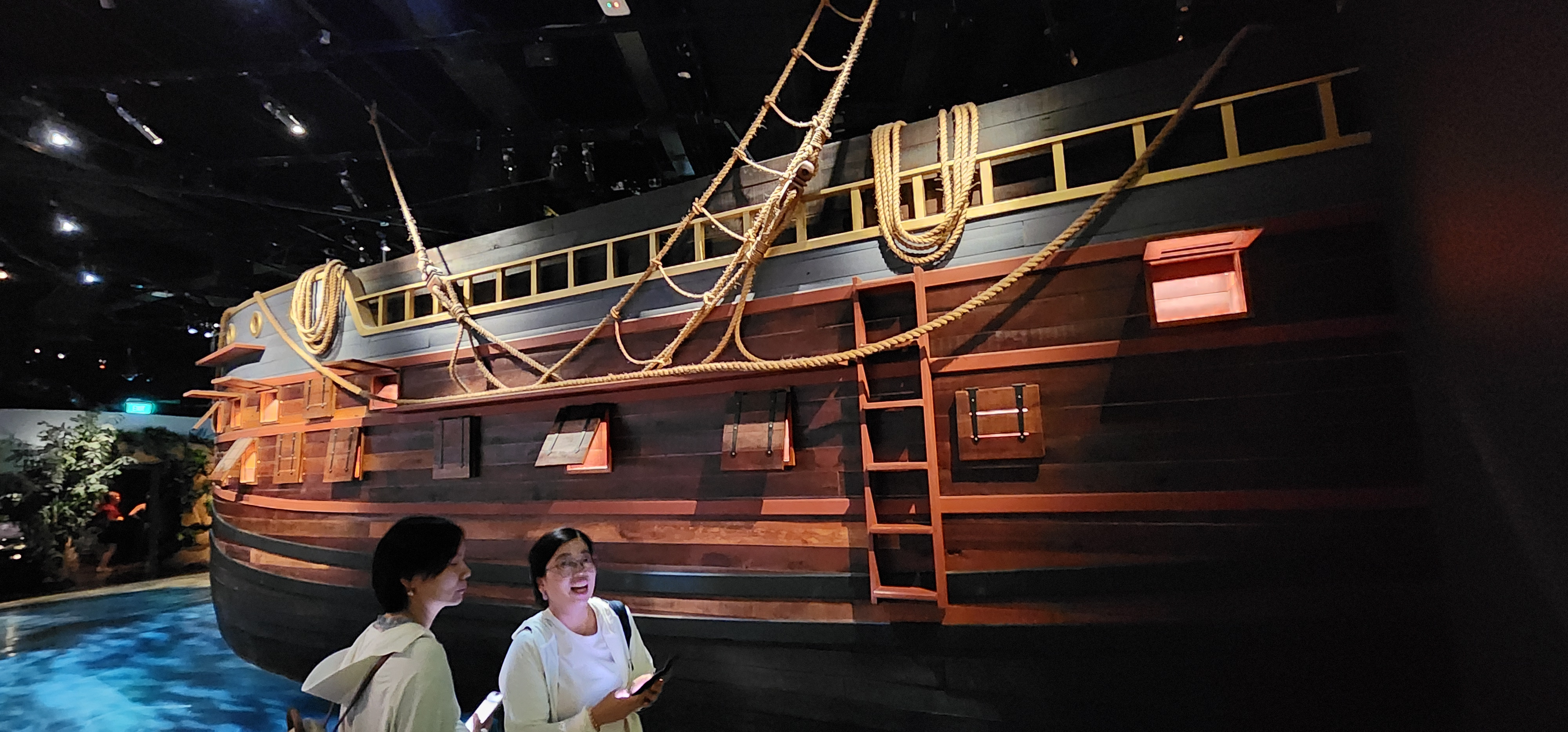
A mockup of, apparently, a 19th-century British warship, installed in 2019

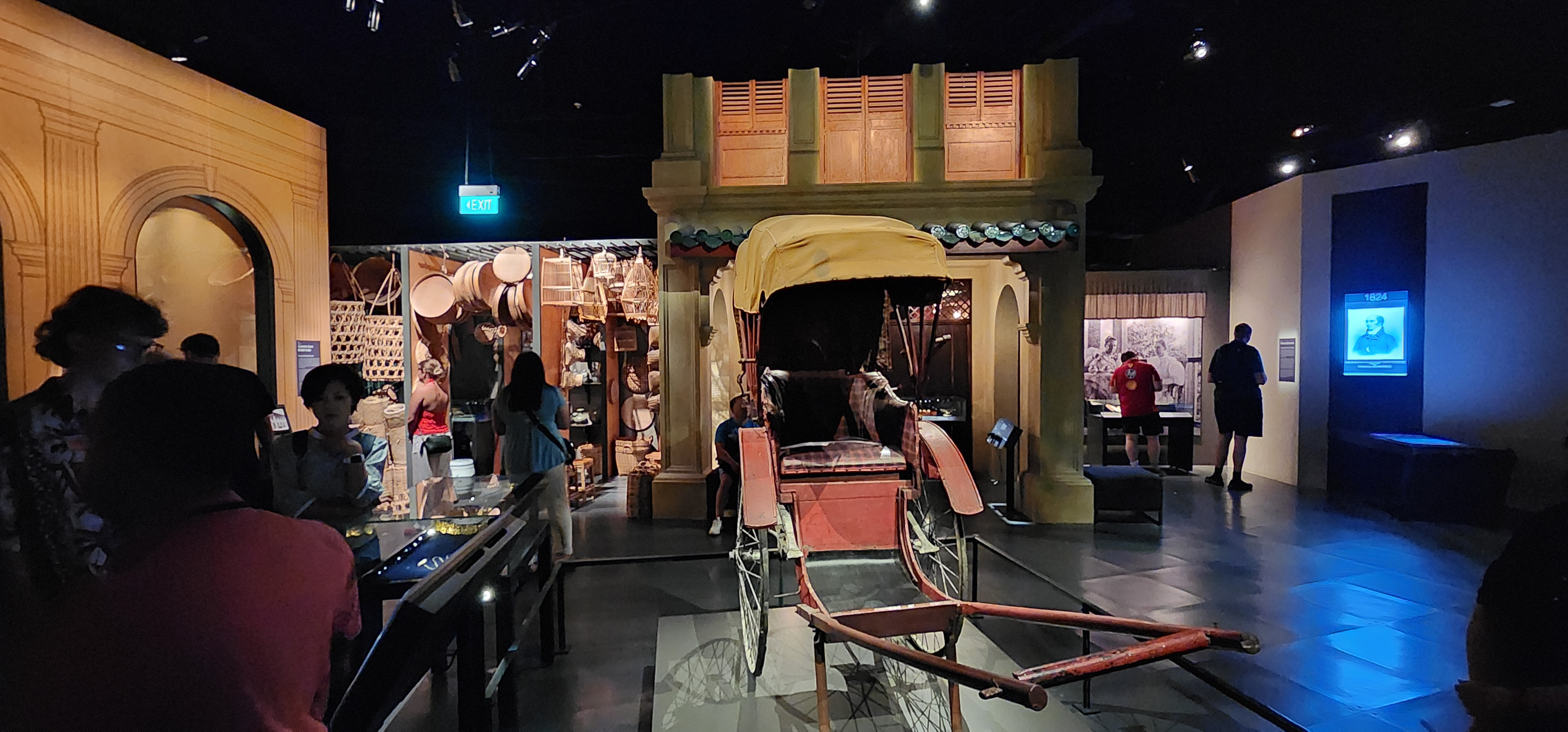
An exhibit on Singapore as a growing port city in during the late 19th century to early 20th century

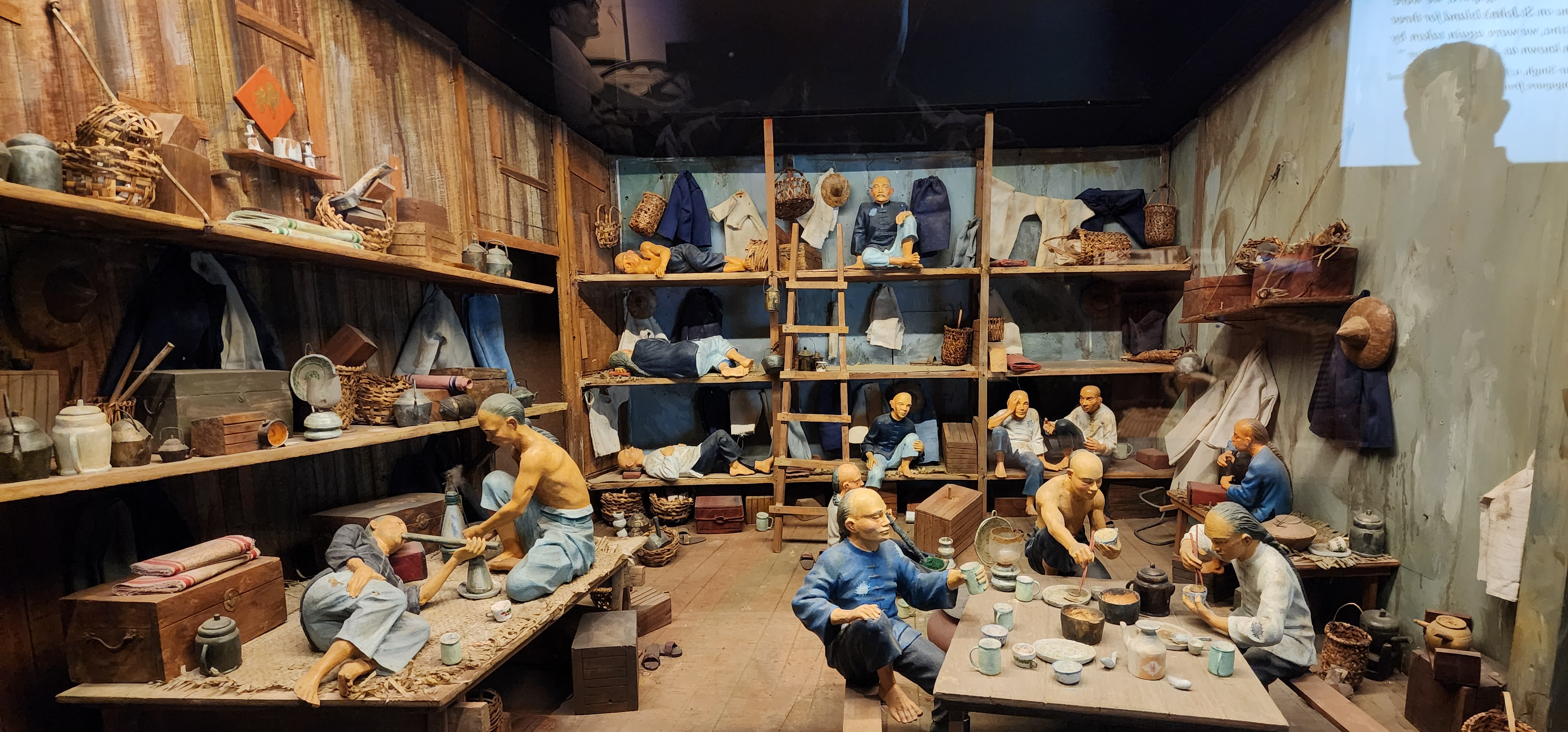
Diorama depicting a coolie room from the 1900s

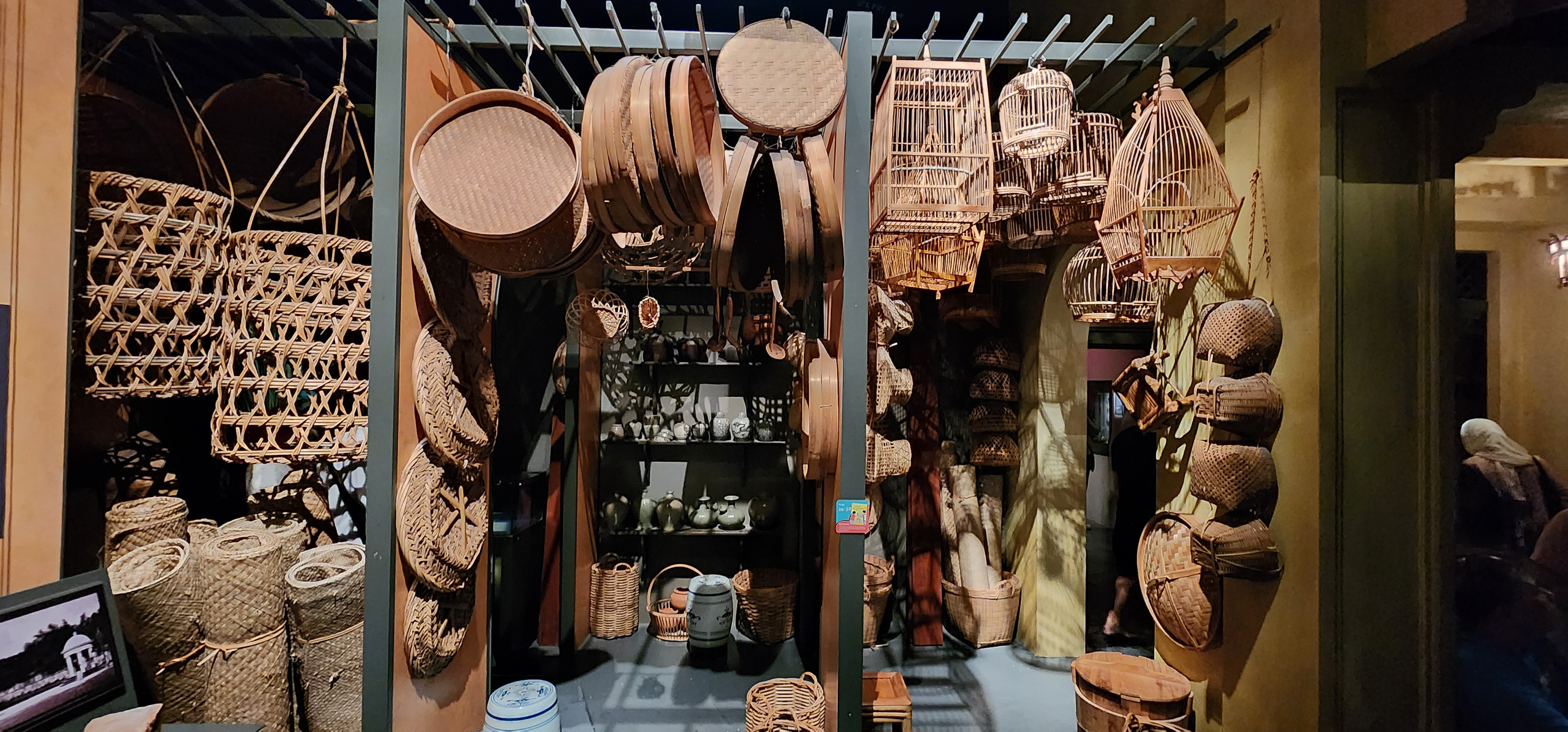
Reconstruction of a 19th-century Singapore shop

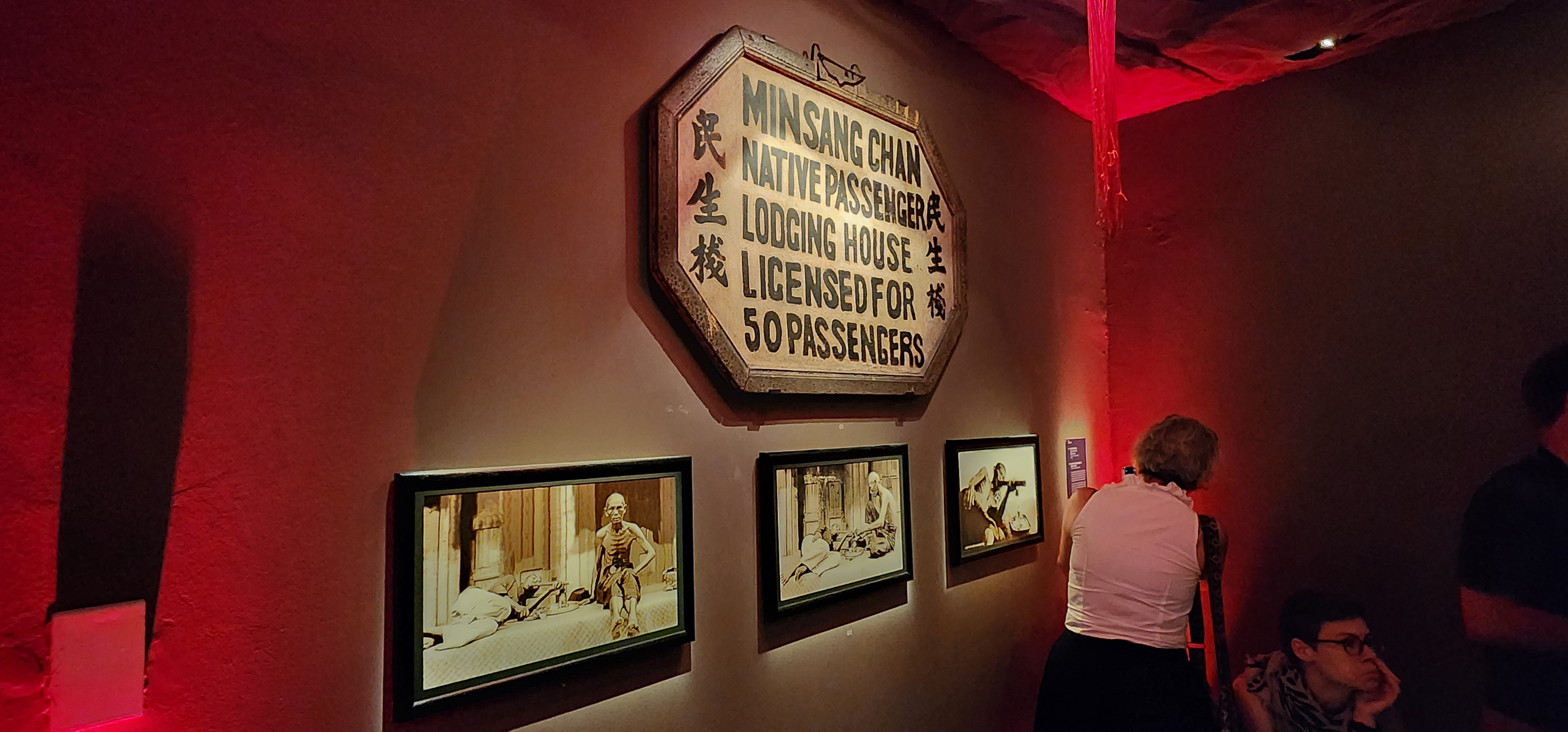
Coolie house sign, early 20th century

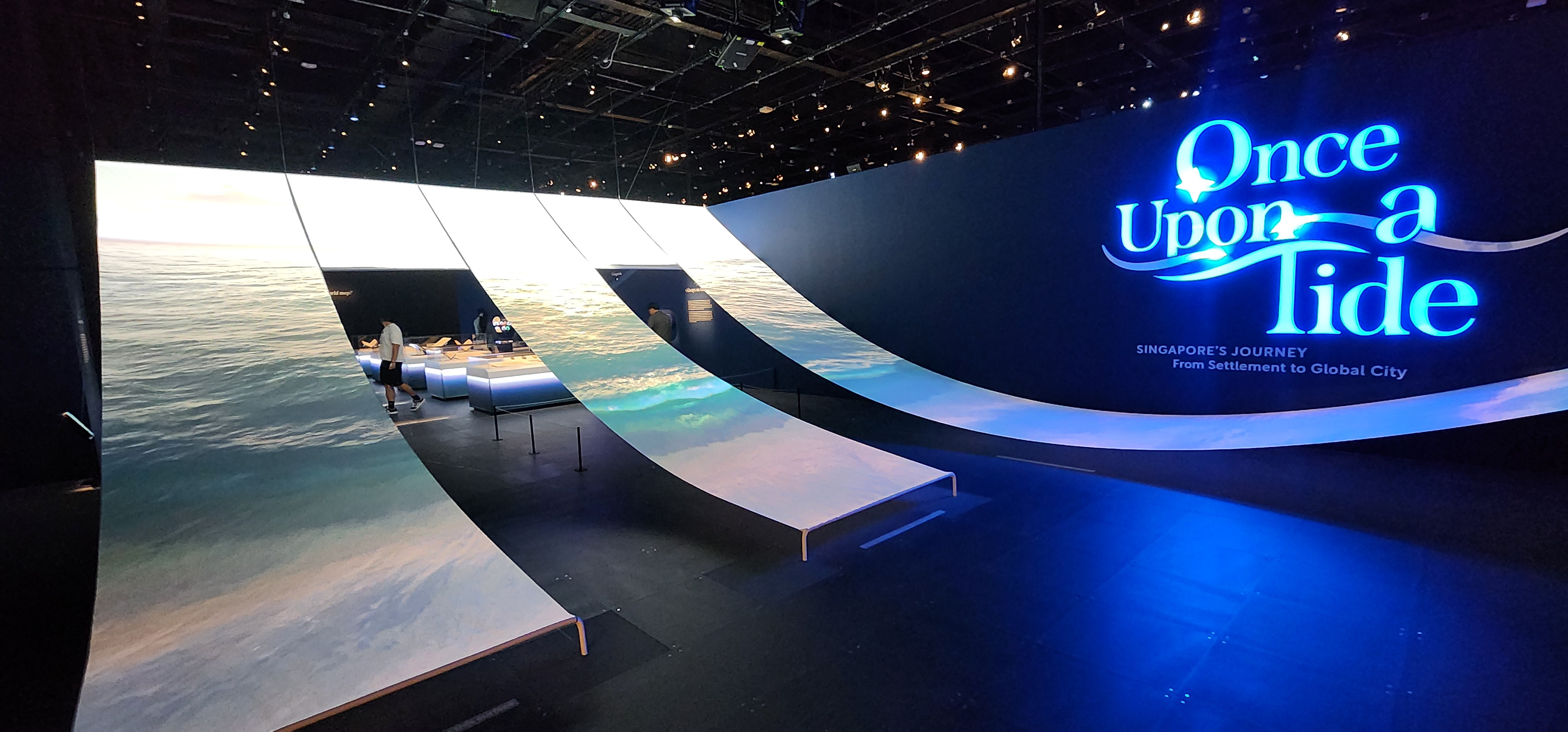
The 2025 Once Upon a Tide exhibition on Singapore's maritime history

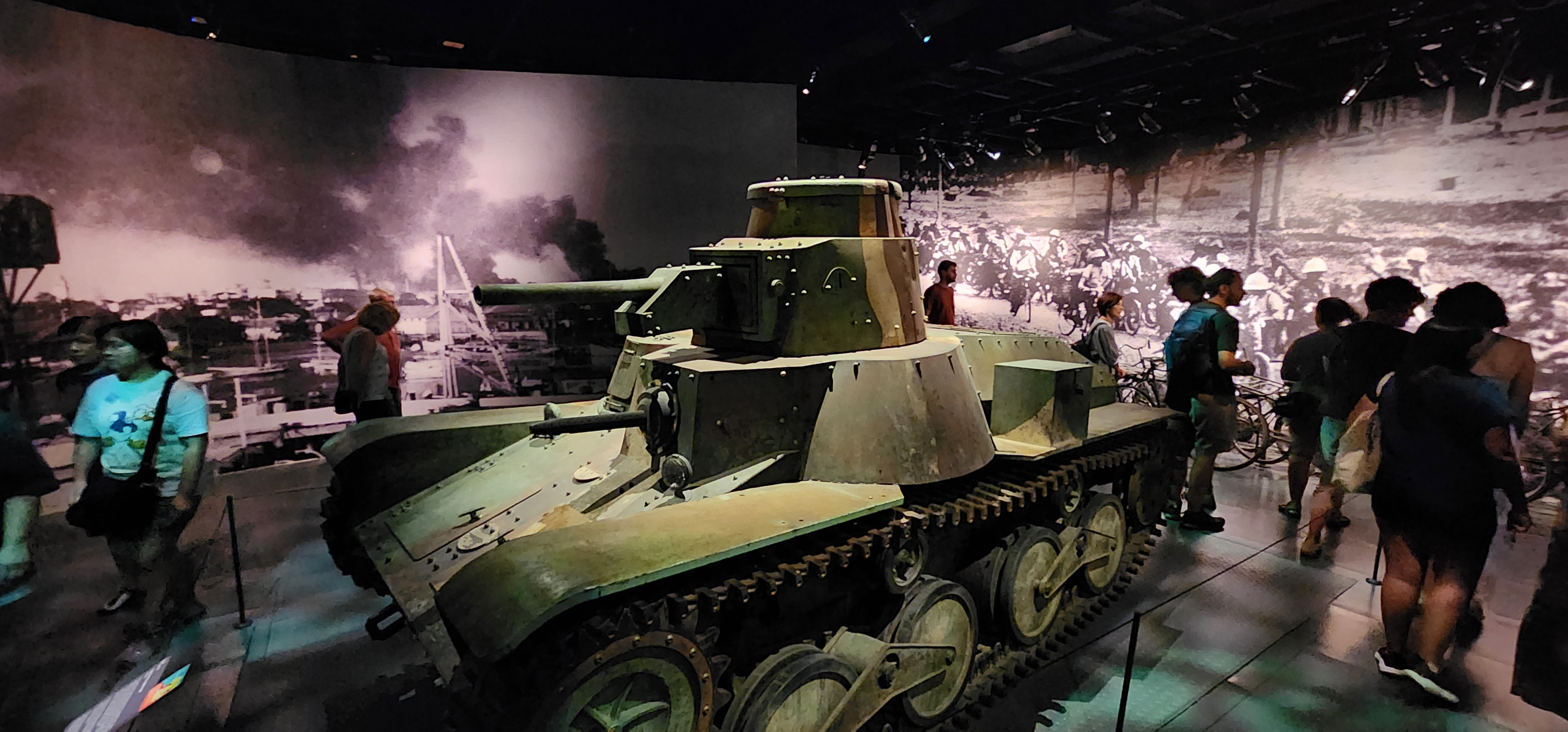
Exhibit on World War II

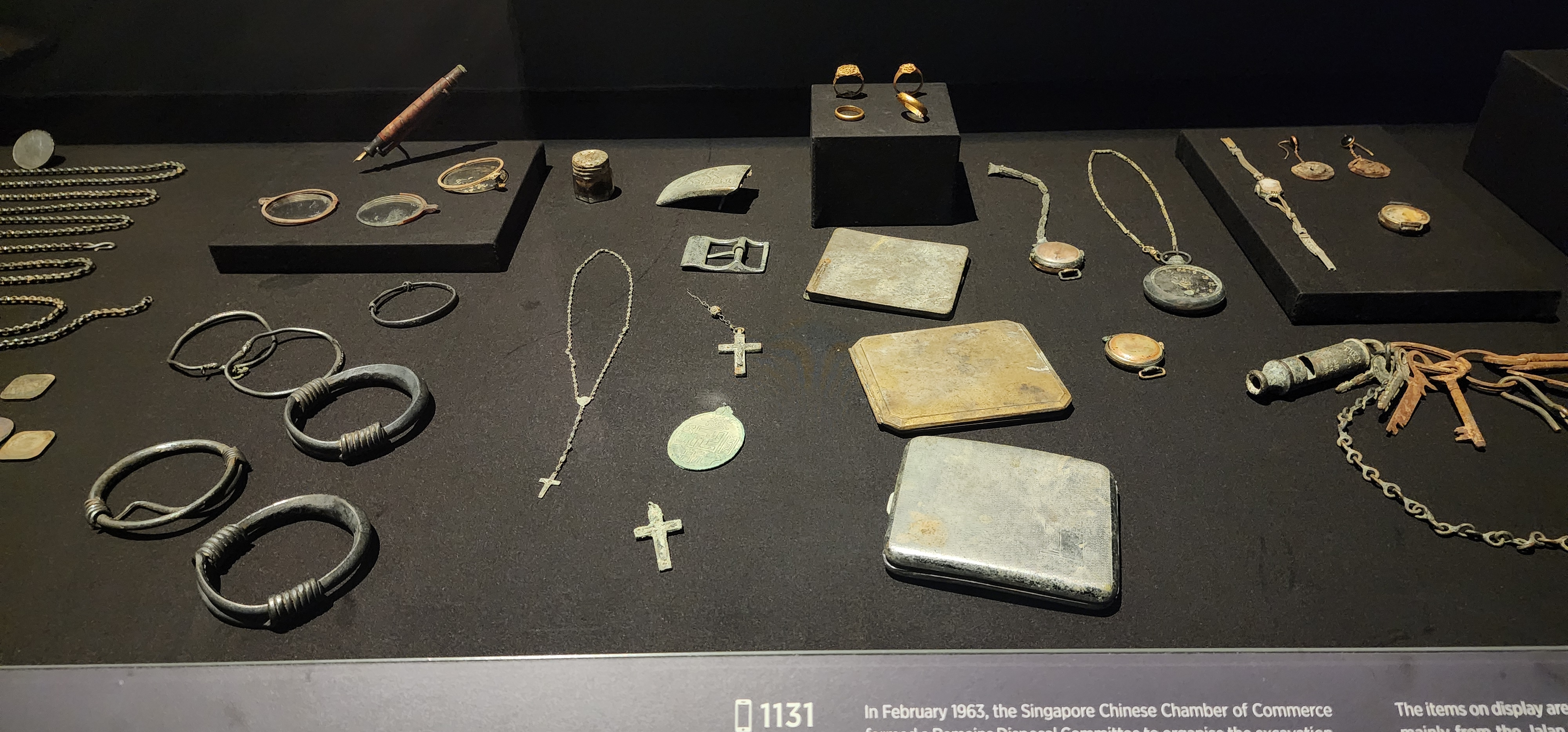
Personal items found in mass graves resulting from the Sook Ching massacre of 1942 by the Imperial Japanese Army

== See also ==
- List of museums in Singapore
- Museum Planning Area
