= Tao Nan School =

Tao Nan School（DàonánXúexiào） 道南学校
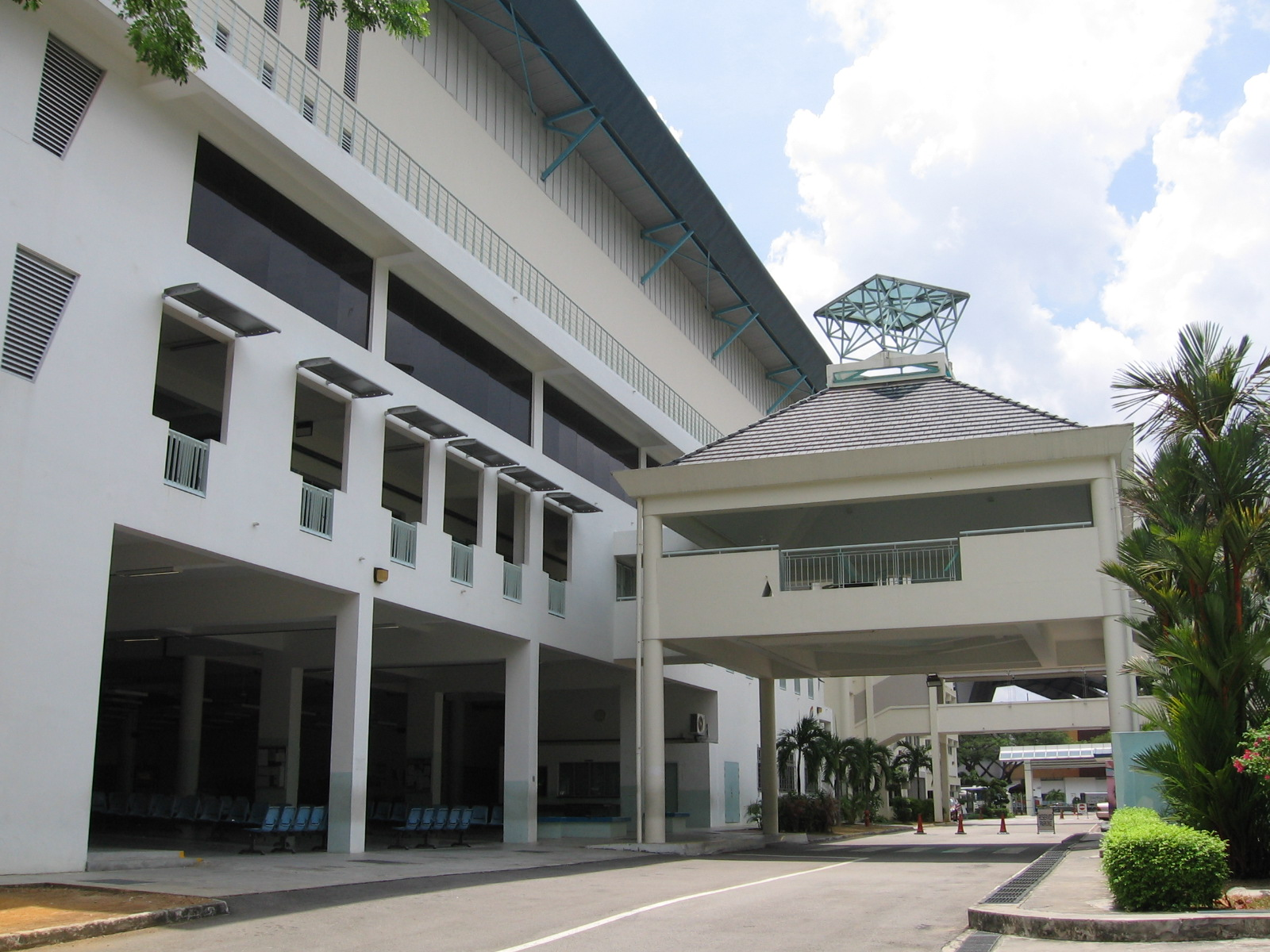

Location
- 49 Marine Crescent, Singapore 449761; 1.305375°N 103.911164°E

Information
- Type: Government-aided
- Motto: Sincerity and Perseverance
- Established: 18 November 1906; 119 years ago
- Session: Single (Since 2017)
- School code: 5240
- Principal: Poh Qinyu
- Enrolment: Approx. 2,242
- Colour: Blue white
- Website: http://www.taonan.moe.edu.sg

Tao Nan School (abbreviation: TNS; simplified Chinese: 道南学校; traditional Chinese: 道南學校) is a co-educational primary school in Marine Parade, Singapore. One of the six Singapore Hokkien Huay Kuan schools. Along with Ai Tong School, Chongfu Primary School, Kong Hwa School, Nan Chiau Primary School and Nan Chiau High School, Tao Nan School is among the 30 most popular primary schools listed by the Ministry of Education.

Tao Nan School is also offering the Gifted Education Programme that started in 1996. In 2007, it also started the Bi-Cultural Chinese Elective Programme (BiCEP) to develop effective bilingualism in its students. Tao Nan celebrated its 100th anniversary in 2006 with a carnival held on November 4. To provide better infrastructure to support the teaching and learning of its students, Tao Nan School underwent the PERI Upgrading from 2014 to 2015 and operated at the holding site in Bedok South Road. With the completion of the Upgrading Exercise, it returned to Marine Parade in 2016.

== School crest ==
The school crest consists of a leaping lion and an open book on a blue shield. The lion represents the Lion City, which is Singapore. Its leaping position symbolises bravery and continuous progress and advancement in the face of difficulties. The open book represents the unquenchable thirst for knowledge. At the base of the crest is the school's motto: "Sincerity and Perseverance". The entire crest signifies the acquisition of abundant knowledge and the training of the strong and healthy body.

== History ==
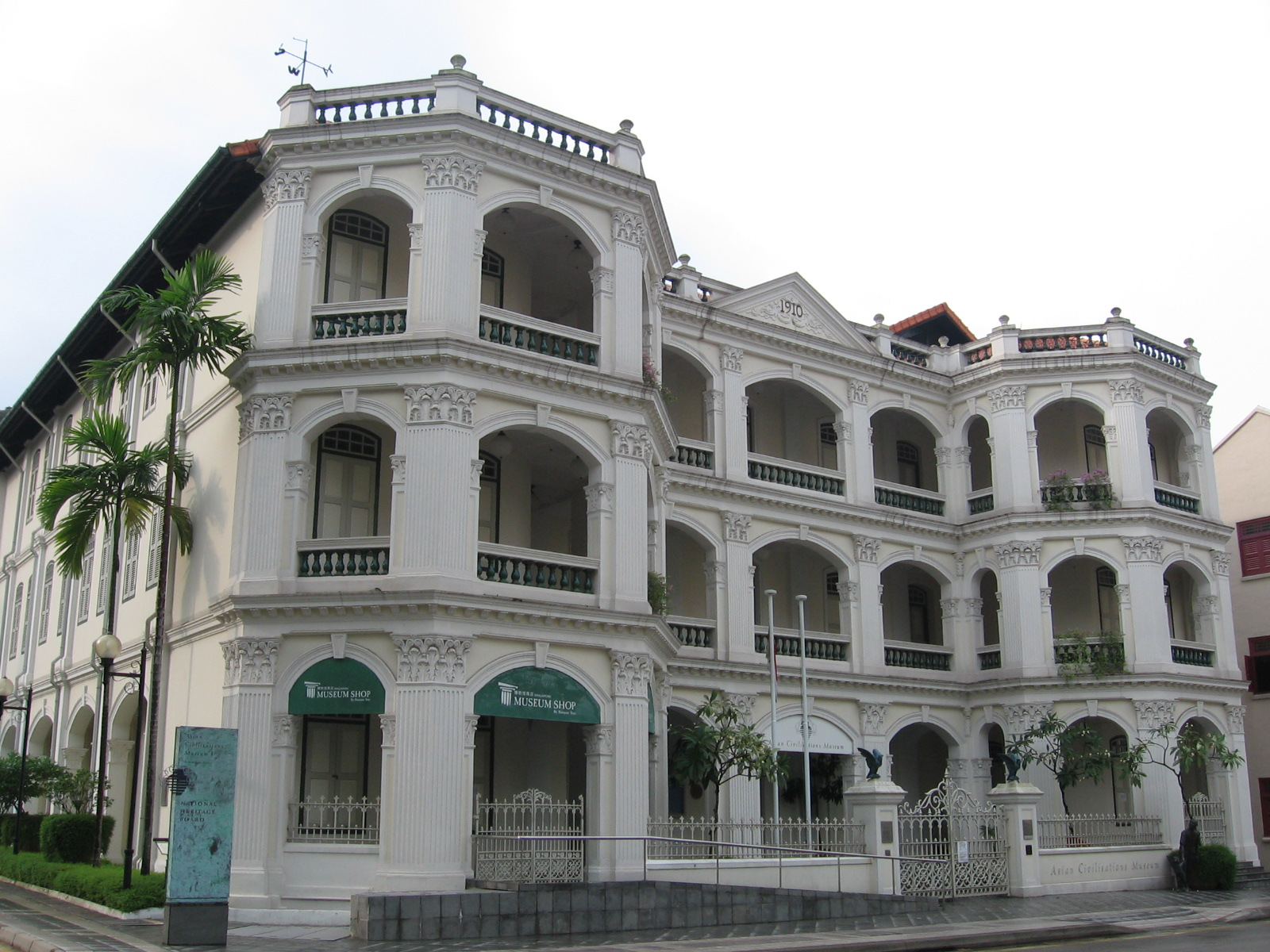
Tao Nan School once occupied this building on Armenian Street from 1911 to 1981. The old building now houses the Peranakan Museum, and has been gazetted as a national monument.

The Hokkien Clan Association (otherwise known as the Hokkien Huay Kuan) started Tao Nan School on 18 November 1906. It was one of the six modern Chinese schools in Singapore with a curriculum influenced by the educational reforms in China at the end of the 19th century. The school was initially named Tao Nan Study Hall (道南學堂, Taonan hsüeht'ang). Taonan hsüeht'ang (道南學堂) can be translated as "spreading our philosophy, our culture and ideas to the South".

Classes were first held at the residence of Tan Kim Ching on North Bridge Road. With support from the Hokkien community, a purpose-built school was constructed. Benefactors include Tan Boon Liat, Lee Cheng Yan, Low Kim Pong, Tan Kah Kee, and Oei Tiong Ham, Majoor der Chinezen, the sugar magnate from Semarang, Central Java, whose donation largely financed the purchase of land on Armenian Street. Although it was originally set up to serve the Hokkien community and the lessons were held in Hokkien, it became the first Chinese school to accept speakers of other Chinese dialects.

The move to Armenian Street coincided with the 1911 overthrow of the Qing dynasty. Tao Nan became the first Chinese school to change the medium of instruction from the Hokkien dialect to Mandarin. One of the teachers was the philanthropist Lee Kong Chian (1894–1967). Pioneer artist Pan Shou was the headmaster from 1932 to 1940.

In 1982, Tao Nan School moved to a new campus in Marine Parade, where it still remains to this date. It was named a SAP (Special Assistance Plan) school in 1990 and a Gifted Education Programme Centre in 1996. In 2014, it moved to a temporary campus in Bedok South, while the Marine Parade campus underwent PERI Upgrading. It moved back into the Marine Parade campus in 2016. With 110 years of history (as of 2016) it is one of Singapore's oldest primary schools.

== Culture ==
=== Sports' Day ===
Every year, there is a sports day event held by the Singapore Hokkien Huay Kuan; all members (i.e. Ai Tong School, Kong Hwa School, Chongfu Primary School, Nan Chiau Primary School) and Tao Nan itself.

=== Co-curricular activities (CCA) ===
Tao Nan has numerous Co-curricular activities ranging from uniform groups like Brownies and Scouts to cultural groups like Chinese Dance and Chinese Orchestra.

Sports & Games

- Wushu
- Track and Field
- Badminton
- Swimming
- Netball
- Basketball
- Sailing

Clubs & Societies

- International Chess Club
- Art Club
- Science Club
- Chinese Drama
- Media Resource Library
- Comics Club
- Chinese Club
- Physical Science

Uniformed Groups

- Scouts
- Brownies
- Girls' Brigade
- Boys' Brigade

Cultural Groups

- Guzheng
- Chinese Dance
- Chinese Orchestra
- Choir

=== Electives ===
- Advanced Mathematics Enrichment Class (AMEC) (For GEP students only)
- Mathematics E2K (For mainstream students; GEP students has it covered in lesson time)
- Science E2K (For mainstream students; GEP students has it covered in lesson time)

== Notable alumni ==
- Lee Kong Chian, founder of Lee Rubber and Lee Foundation, Singapore's largest private charitable foundation
- Yeo Cheow Tong, Cabinet Minister (1990–2006), Member of Parliament
- Eleanor Lee, actress and singer currently based in China

== See also ==
- Old Tao Nan School
