= National Heritage Board (Singapore) =

Statutory board in Singapore

- Lembaga Warisan Negara (Malay) 国家文物局 (Chinese) தேசிய மரபுடைமைக் கழகம் (Tamil)

Agency overview
- Formed: 1 August 1993; 33 years ago
- Preceding agency: National Archives, National Museum and Oral History Department
- Jurisdiction: Government of Singapore
- Annual budget: S$104 million (2010)
- Minister responsible: David Neo (acting), Minister for Culture, Community and Youth
- Deputy Ministers responsible: Low Yen Ling, Minister of State for Culture, Community and Youth; Alvin Tan, Minister of State for Culture, Community and Youth; Eric Chua, Parliamentary Secretary for Culture, Community and Youth
- Agency executives: Yeoh Chee Yan, Chairman; Chang Hwee Nee, CEO; Alvin Tan, Deputy Chief Executive (Policy & Community); Chan Yin Teng Jennifer, Deputy Chief Executive (Corporate Development); Ting Wei Jin Kennie, Group Director (Museums)
- Parent agency: Ministry of Culture, Community and Youth
- Child agencies: National Museum of Singapore; Asian Civilisations Museum; Peranakan Museum
- Website: www.nhb.gov.sg
- Agency ID: T08GB0036B

The National Heritage Board (NHB) is a statutory board under the Ministry of Culture, Community and Youth (MCCY) of the Government of Singapore. It was formed on 1 August 1993.

== National museums and heritage institutions ==
The National Heritage Board operates the following national museums and heritage institutions.

Museums

1. Asian Civilisations Museum
2. National Museum of Singapore
3. Peranakan Museum
4. Singapore Philatelic Museum (to be rebranded as Children's Museum Singapore)
5. Reflections at Bukit Chandu

Heritage Institutions

1. Language
2. Preservation of Sites and Monuments
3. Heritage Conservation Centre - architecture and building project
1. Indian Heritage Centre
2. Malay Heritage Centre
3. Sun Yat Sen Nanyang Memorial Hall

== Museum Roundtable ==
The Museum Roundtable is an initiative led by NHB since 1996.

There are more than 50 members for this initiative, consisting of public and private museums, heritage galleries and attractions in Singapore such as the Singapore Art Museum, the National Museum of Singapore, the Asian Civilisations Museum, the Science Centre Singapore and the National Library of Singapore.

It regularly organises joint-events with the NHB and other private and public partners in an attempt to elevate Singapore's heritage and museological landscape. Examples of such key events are International Museum Day, which is held annually in May, and Children's Season, which aims to cultivate museum-going interests in children with exhibits and installations at various participating museums.

== Publications ==
- Fashion Designers Society (Singapore) (1993). Costumes through time, Singapore. Singapore. National Heritage Board. National Heritage Board and Fashion Designers Society. ISBN 9971883872.
- Sharma, R. C. (Ramesh Chandra) (1994). Alamkara : 5000 years of Indian art. National Heritage Board. ISBN 978-0-944142-97-4.
- National Heritage Board (1995). The legacy of Majapahit. Singapore: National Heritage Board. ISBN 9971884534.
- Kwok, Kian Chow (1996). Channels & confluences : a history of Singapore art. Singapore: National Heritage Board; Singapore Art Museum. ISBN 9810074883.
- Sabapathy, T. K.; Koay, Susie (1996). Modernity and beyond : themes in Southeast Asian art. Singapore Art Museum. National Heritage Board. ISBN 9810074875.
- 王, 賡武; 李, 楚琳 (1997). The Chinese collections (中国文物収藏). Singapore. National Heritage Board. National Heritage Board. ISBN 9971885646.
- National Heritage Board (1998). Singapore : journey into nationhood. Singapore: Landmark Books. ISBN 9813065214.ISBN 9813065206
- 劉, 抗; 中华人民共和国文化部; Singapore. Ministry of Information and the Arts (2000). Journeys : Liu Kang and his art =(艺程 : 刘抗其人其艺). National Arts Council : Singapore Art Museum, National Heritage Board. ISBN 9810432704.
- Singapore Art Museum; Singapore. National Heritage Board (2001). The president's young talents exhibition. Singapore Art Museum, National Heritage Board. ISBN 9810440294.ISBN 9810481454ISBN 9789810970741
- Uma Devi, G (2002). Singapore's 100 historic places. National Heritage Board. Archipelago Press. ISBN 9789814068239.
- National Heritage Board (Singapore) (2003). Reflections of our heritage. National Heritage Board.
- Chen, Ruixian (2004). 无时无涯 = Embracing infinity. Singapore Art Museum. National Heritage Board : National Arts Council. ISBN 9810500661.
- National Heritage Board (2005). Born in Singapore DVD-ROM. National Heritage Board. - The collector's edition
- Singapore History Museum (2005). Singapore History Museum : a year in review 2004-2005. Singapore History Museum, National Heritage Board.
- Krahl, Regina; Effeny, Alison (2010). Shipwrecked : Tang treasures and monsoon winds. ArtScience Museum (Singapore). Arthur M. Sackler Gallery, Smithsonian Institution; National Heritage Board : Singapore Tourism Board.
