= Armenian Street, Singapore =

Street in Singapore

Coordinates: 1°17′39″N 103°50′56″E

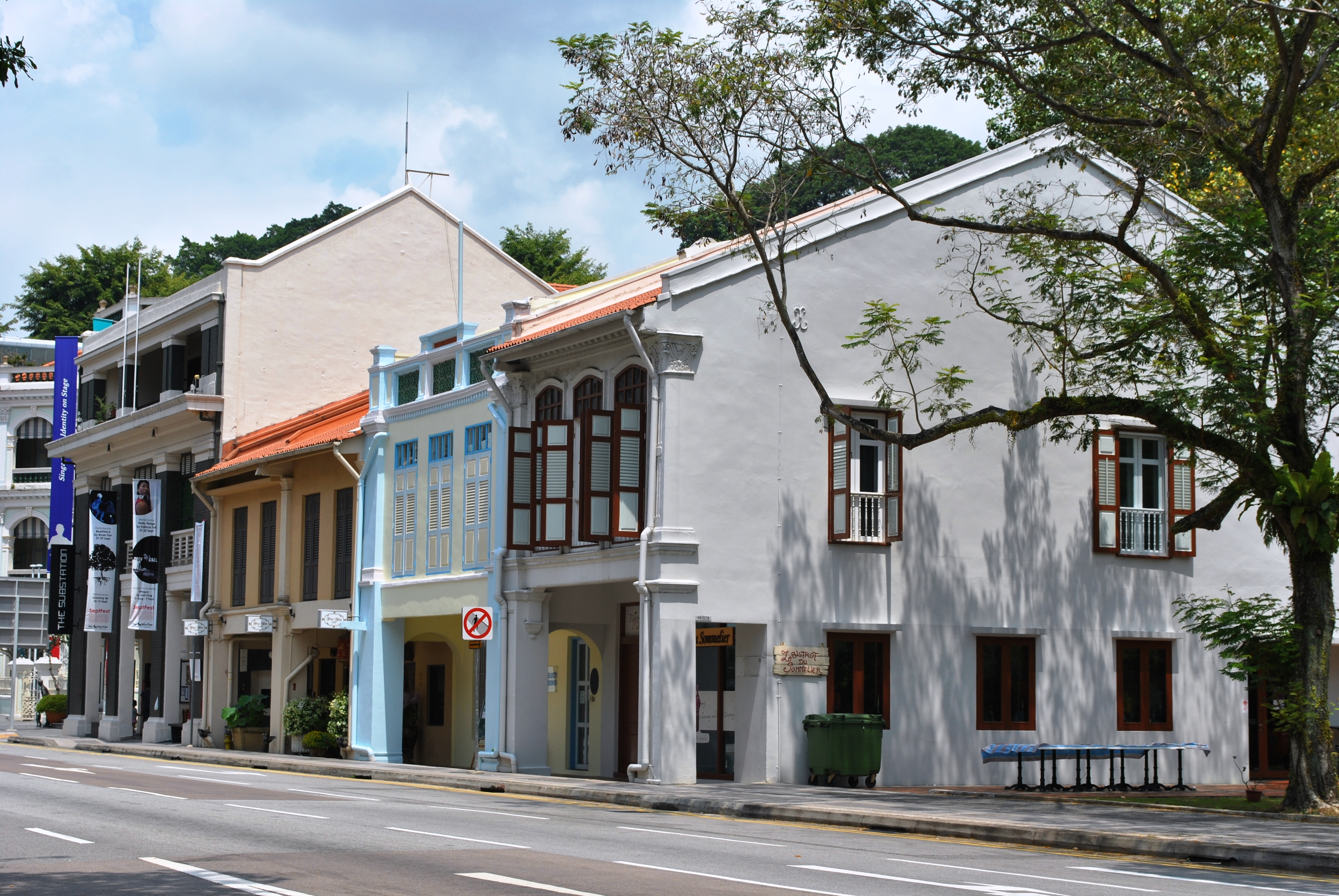
Armenian Street, Singapore

Armenian Street (Chinese: 亚米尼亚街) is a street in Central Singapore located in the Museum Planning Area. The street covers a short distance that starts from Coleman Street and ends at the junction of Stamford Road and Waterloo Street. The road houses a couple of landmarks including The Substation and the Old Tao Nan School which is the Peranakan Museum, part of the Asian Civilisations Museum. The museum officially opened in 2008.

== See also ==
- List of places named after Armenia
