= Ai Tong School =

Ai Tong School (ATS) 爱同学校

Location
- 100 Bright Hill Drive, Singapore 579646
- 1°21′38″N 103°49′58″E

Information
- Type: Government-aided, mixed, SAP
- Motto: Sincerity and Perseverance
- Established: 12 October 1912; 113 years ago
- Session: Single
- School code: 5625
- Principal: Mr Wong Jia Wang
- Colours: Red🟥, blue🟦, white⬜
- Website: http://www.aitong.moe.edu.sg/

Ai Tong School (simplified Chinese: 爱同学校; traditional Chinese: 愛同學校; pinyin: Àitóng xuéxiào) is a primary school located in Bishan, Singapore. It is one of the five affiliated primary schools under the Singapore Hokkien Huay Kuan. As a Chinese-medium school, Ai Tong emphasises strongly on the learning of Chinese culture, language and values. Ai Tong School is considered to be one of the most popular primary schools in Singapore, with places in the primary 1 intake frequently being oversubscribed.

The name Ai Tong (爱同) is derived from the Chinese values of "Bo Ai" (博爱) and "Da Tong" (大同) which means 'Love for all humanity' and 'Equality/Harmony' respectively. This name was given by Pastor Ong Kah Mok, one of the founders of this school.

Notable alumni include Eric Chua Swee Leong, Senior Parliamentary Secretary for Social and Family Development & Culture, Community and Youth; Chantalle Ng class of 2007, Singaporean actress and also daughter of Singaporean actress Lin Meijiao and Singapore actor Huang Yiliang and the 2 sons of Singaporean Actress Pan Lingling and her husband Huang Shinan.

== History ==
Ai Tong School was first established in a Methodist church on Boon Tat Street when it took over the running of a school by missionaries. Although it had an initial intake of 30 pupils, this soon increased to 120 pupils in 1960. In 1917, the school was moved into its own campus, located at 209, Telok Ayer Street, to cope with the larger enrolment.

However, soon after its move, Ai Tong School faced financial difficulties that almost forced the school to sell away its campus. It was rescued financially by Chinese businessman and philanthropist Tan Kah Kee, who provided financial assistance to the school. In 1923, the school faced another financial crisis, and Tan Kah Kee decided to provide funding for the school on a permanent basis. The Singapore Hokkien Huay Kuan subsequently took over the responsibility for running the school in 1929.

After the Japanese occupation of Singapore ended, a branch school located on the old premises of Gan Eng Seng School was started. During this time, there were a huge backlog of students who wanted an education, since many students in Singapore dropped out of school during the occupation. As a result, the enrolment of the school increased to more than 1,600 students. This campus soon proved to be inadequate.

In 1950, Ai Tong School took in female students from the defunct Ai Hwa school and became a co-ed school; it had existed as a boys' school ever since its founding. In 1955, the main school moved to the new Hokkien Huay Kuan Building together with Chong Hock Girls School (the now Chongfu Primary School). This building had facilities like a science laboratory and a geography/history room, a rarity at that time. Two years later, the private school became a government-aided school.

In the 1960s and 1970s, due to the bilingual policy by the Singapore government, enrolment in Chinese-medium schools like Ai Tong School drastically decreased. Initially, this caused the closure of smaller Chinese schools, and by taking in students from some of these schools, Ai Tong's enrolment soon increased to 2360 students. However, after that, Ai Tong suffered the same problem and its enrolment soon fell below 800 students. The problem became worse when, in 1979, only two students registered to join the school in 1980, though one later dropped out. More students were later transferred into the school because the neighbouring English-medium schools were at their full capacity.

Against this backdrop, the school's management decided to move the school to Ang Mo Kio to address the problem of declining enrolment. The construction work for a new school building began at Ang Mo Kio Avenue 3 in 1978. Classes at the new Ai Tong School campus started in 1980, and the school was officially declared open in 1981. The move from its old campus, in addition to the hard work of the principal and staff of the school, helped the school to increase its enrolment from less than 100 before 1981 to 2357 in 1987. Following guidelines from the Ministry of Education, English language was taught as the first language and Chinese as the second language from 1984 onwards.

In 1990, Ai Tong became one of the first primary schools to be granted the status of a Special Assistance Plan school by the Ministry of Education. Schools under this plan have a special focus on teaching Chinese values, and they run special programmes related to the learning of Chinese culture and language.

On 9 July 1992, Ai Tong School moved to 100, Bright Hill Drive, located within Sin Ming estate, to cope with rising enrolment numbers. This campus was officially opened on 9 July 1993 by the then-Minister for Foreign Affairs, Wong Kan Seng, who was also the Member of Parliament for Thomson GRC (of which Sin Ming is a part). An extension block to the school was later added in 1998 to increase the number of special rooms that the school had. The school undergone further refurbishment between November 2002 and 2004 under the Programme for Rebuilding and Improving Existing schools.

On 31 December 2013, Ai Tong School moved to 4300 Ang Mo Kio Avenue 5, Singapore 569869 while renovation works at the previous campus started. The new campus was completed in 2015, and Ai Tong School has since moved back to its original location from 2016 onwards.

== Academics ==
Ai Tong School's curriculum has a strong Chinese influence, and also offers lessons on the Chinese culture and history. It is a designated SAP school, and thus it teaches both the English language and Chinese Language as a first language. Ai Tong has consistently produced top scorers at the national Primary School Leaving Examinations, and is widely regarded as a "top school" in Singapore.

Ai Tong has a twinning programme with a school in Suzhou, China, and it conducts student exchanges between the two schools. In addition, students at the Primary 5 level also get the opportunity to attend cultural exchange programmes to other places in China.

== Affiliations ==
Ai Tong School is affiliated to the Singapore Hokkien Huay Kuan (SHHK) since 1929. It is the second oldest school amongst the five schools that are affiliated to the SHHK, the oldest being Tao Nan School. Other schools that are affiliated to the SHHK includes: Chongfu Primary School, Nan Chiau Primary School, Nan Chiau High School and Kong Hwa School. These schools share a common motto and mission, as well as having joint programmes like the Bi-Cultural Chinese Elective Programme (BICEP).

== Notable alumni ==
- Ong Teng Koon, Member of Parliament (Class of 1989)
- Peh Chin Hua, Former Member of Parliament.
- Yip Pin Xiu, Singaporean paralympian, medalist at the 2008 Summer Paralympics.
- Miko and Yumi Peh, twin sisters, who formed musical band By2, Mandarin pop artists.
- Chantalle Ng, actress
- Sun Xueling, Minister of State, MP of Punggol GRC
- Desmond Choo, MP of Tampines Changkat SMC, Mayor of Northeast CDC
