= Asian Civilisations Museum =

Museum in Singapore

- Muzium Tamadun Asia 亚洲文明博物馆 ஆசிய நாகரீகங்களின் அருங்காட்சியகம்
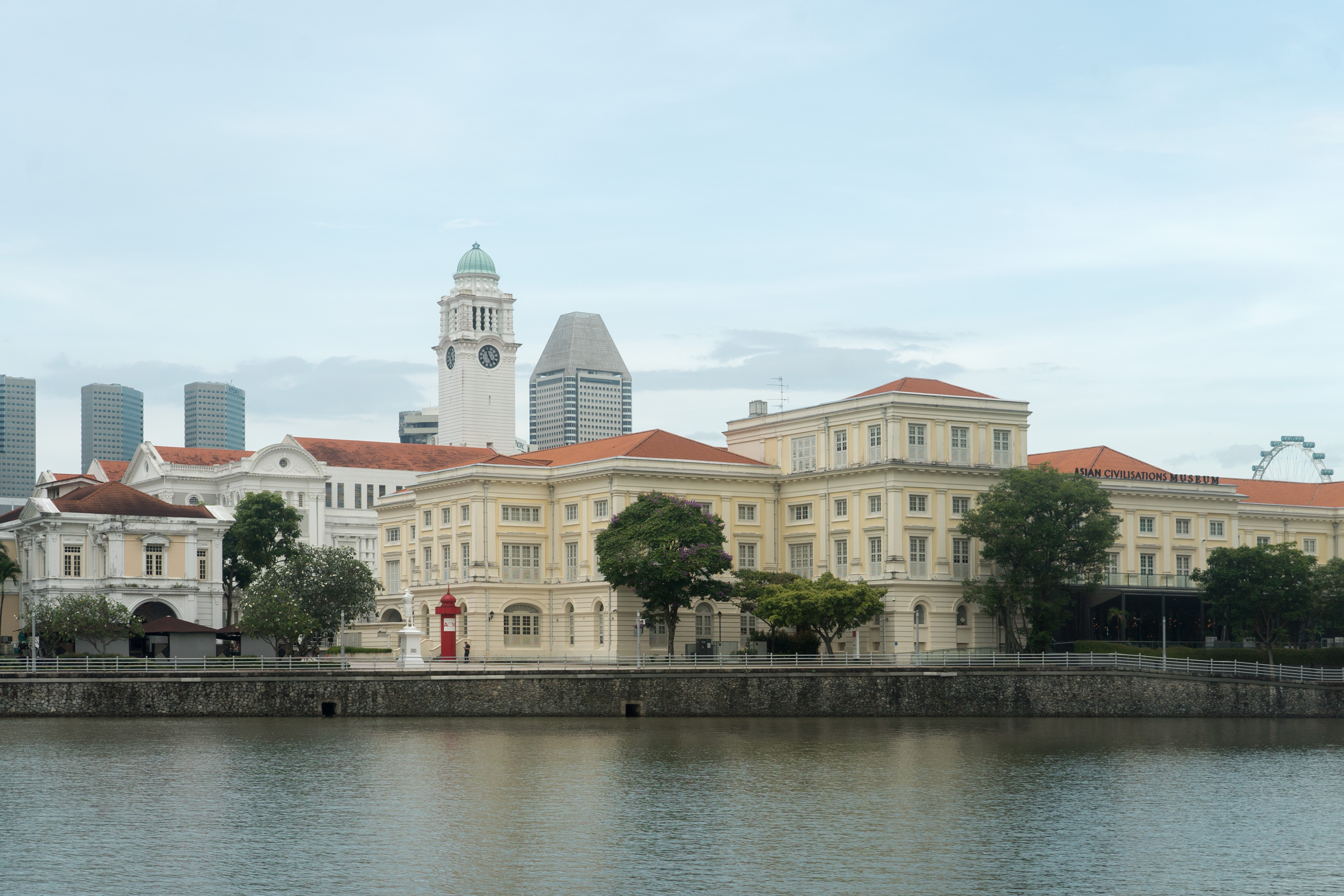

- Location within Singapore
- Established: 22 April 1997; 29 years ago
- Location: 1 Empress Place; Empress Place Building; Singapore
- Coordinates: 1°17′15″N 103°51′05″E
- Type: Southeast Asian, South Asian, West Asian and East Asian Heritage
- Public transit access: EW14 NS26 Raffles Place; EW13 NS25 City Hall; CC3 Esplanade
- Website: Asian Civilisations Museum

The Asian Civilisations Museum (ACM) is an institution which forms a part of the four museums in Singapore, the other three being the Peranakan Museum, the National Museum of Singapore and the Singapore Art Museum.

It is one of the pioneering museums in the region to specialise in pan-Asian cultures and civilisations. The museum specialises in the material history of China, Southeast Asia, South Asia and West Asia, from which the diverse ethnic groups of Singapore trace their ancestry.

== History ==
The museum first opened at the Old Tao Nan School building on 22 April 1997 at Armenian Street, with exhibits largely centred on Chinese civilisation. With the restoration of the Empress Place Building, the museum established its new flagship museum there on 2 March 2003, rapidly expanding the collection to other areas of Asia. The Armenian Street branch closed for renovations on 1 January 2006 and reopened on 25 April 2008 as the Peranakan Museum, specialising in Peranakan culture.

On 16 September 2006, the Museum officially launched its new logo with a new slogan The Asian Civilisations Museum – Where Asian Cultures Come Alive!. The logo shows the museum's location by the Singapore River. The reflected image highlights the Museum as a place for reflection while the orange represents activity and energy.

In late 2013, after undergoing a rebranding exercise, the Museum launched its new logo with a new slogan Singapore's Museum of Asia.

On 16 September 2014, the Museum was named the top museum in Singapore and ranked ninth in Asia by TripAdvisor's Travellers' Choice awards. The Museum was the only Singapore museum ranked among Asia's top 10 museums.

On 15 November 2015, the Museum unveiled its new spaces after it started its revamp in 2014. The revamp is carried out in phases: Phase 1 was unveiled on 14 November 2015. Phase 2 was completed in April 2016, with further enhancements to follow.

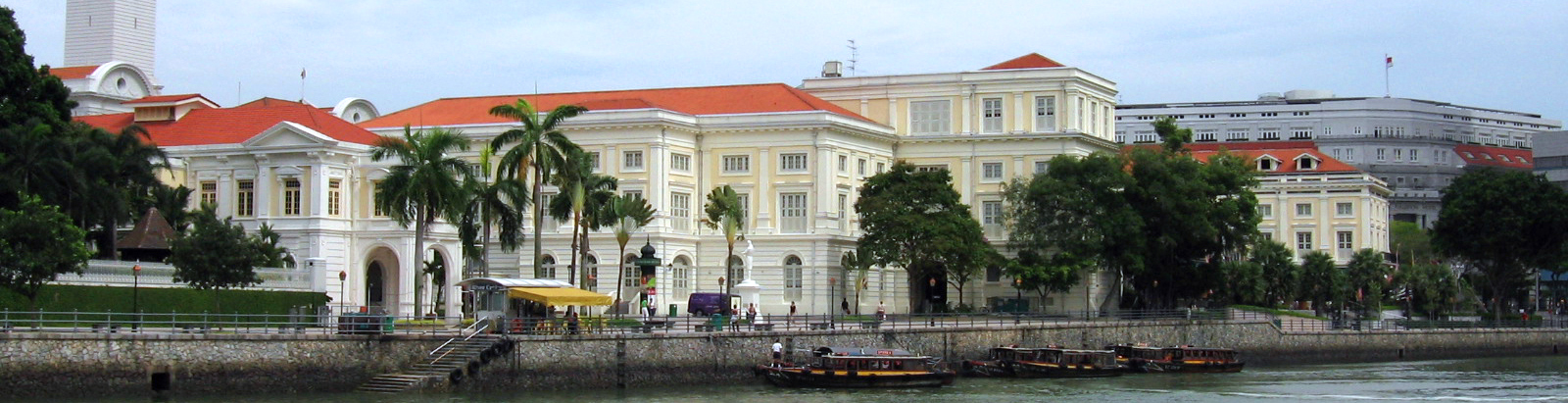
Asian Civilisations Museum, Empress Place

== Collection highlights ==
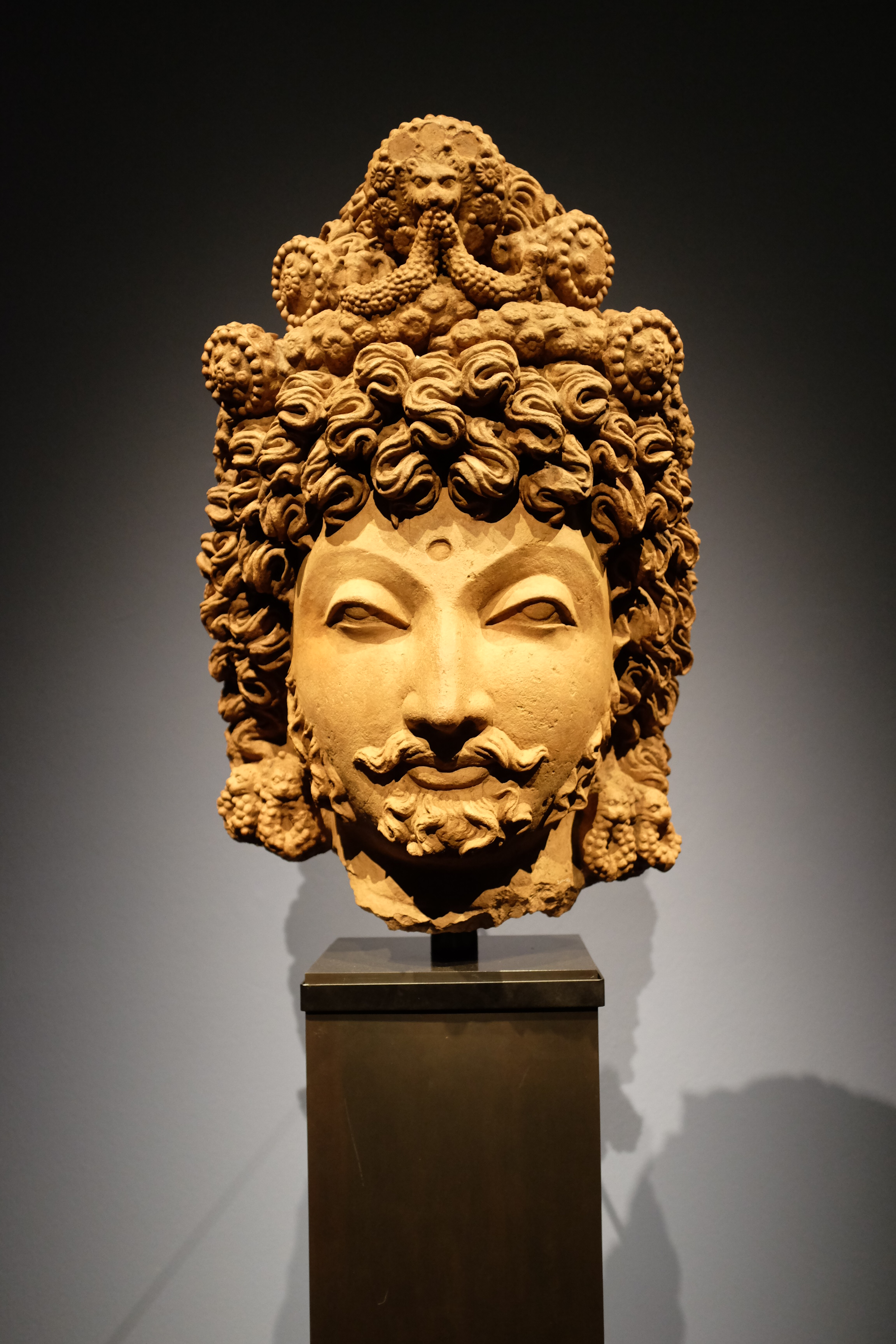
Head of a Bodhisattva, Gandhara, ca. 4th century

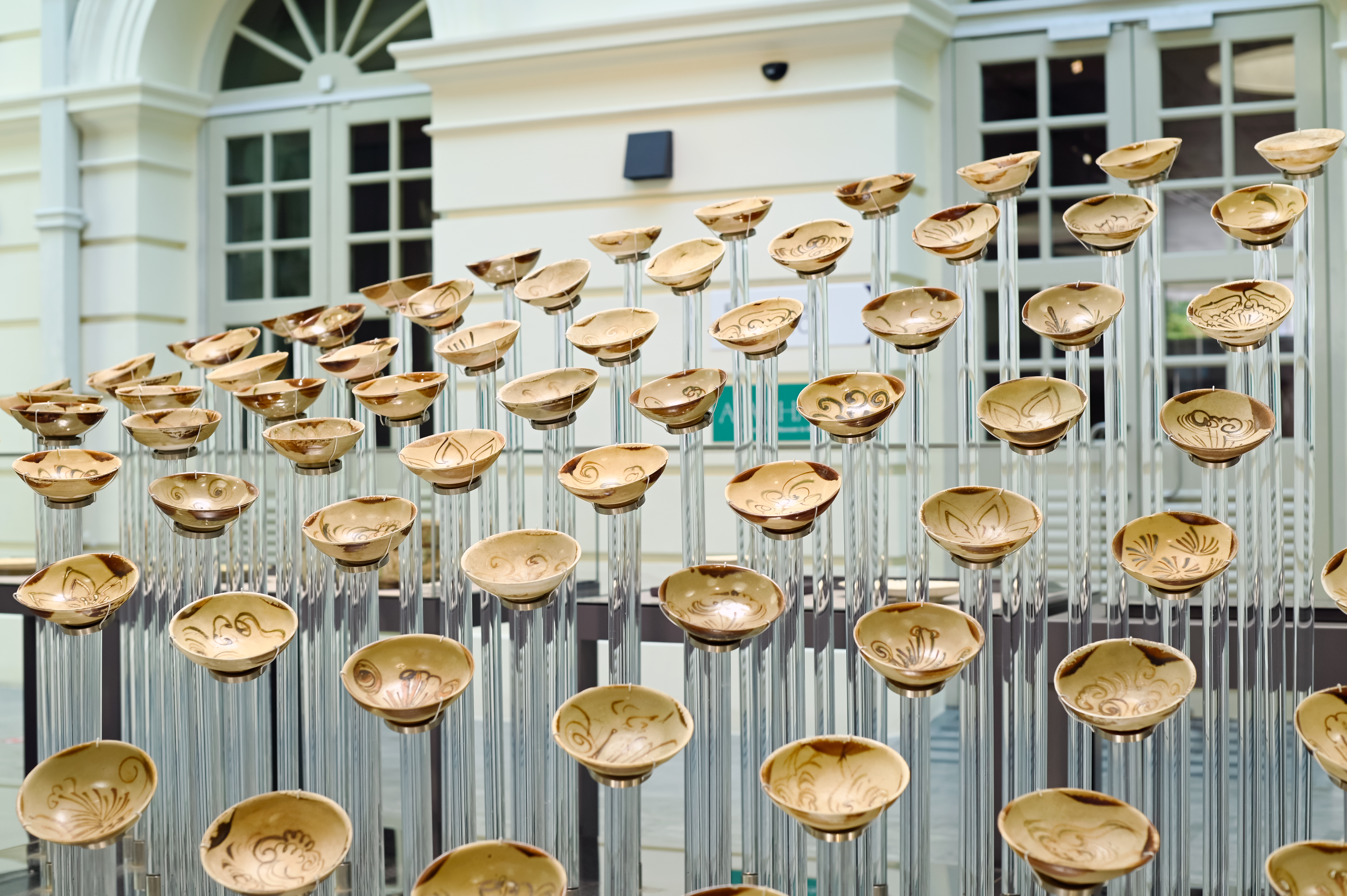
Ceramic plates recovered from the Tang Shipwreck.

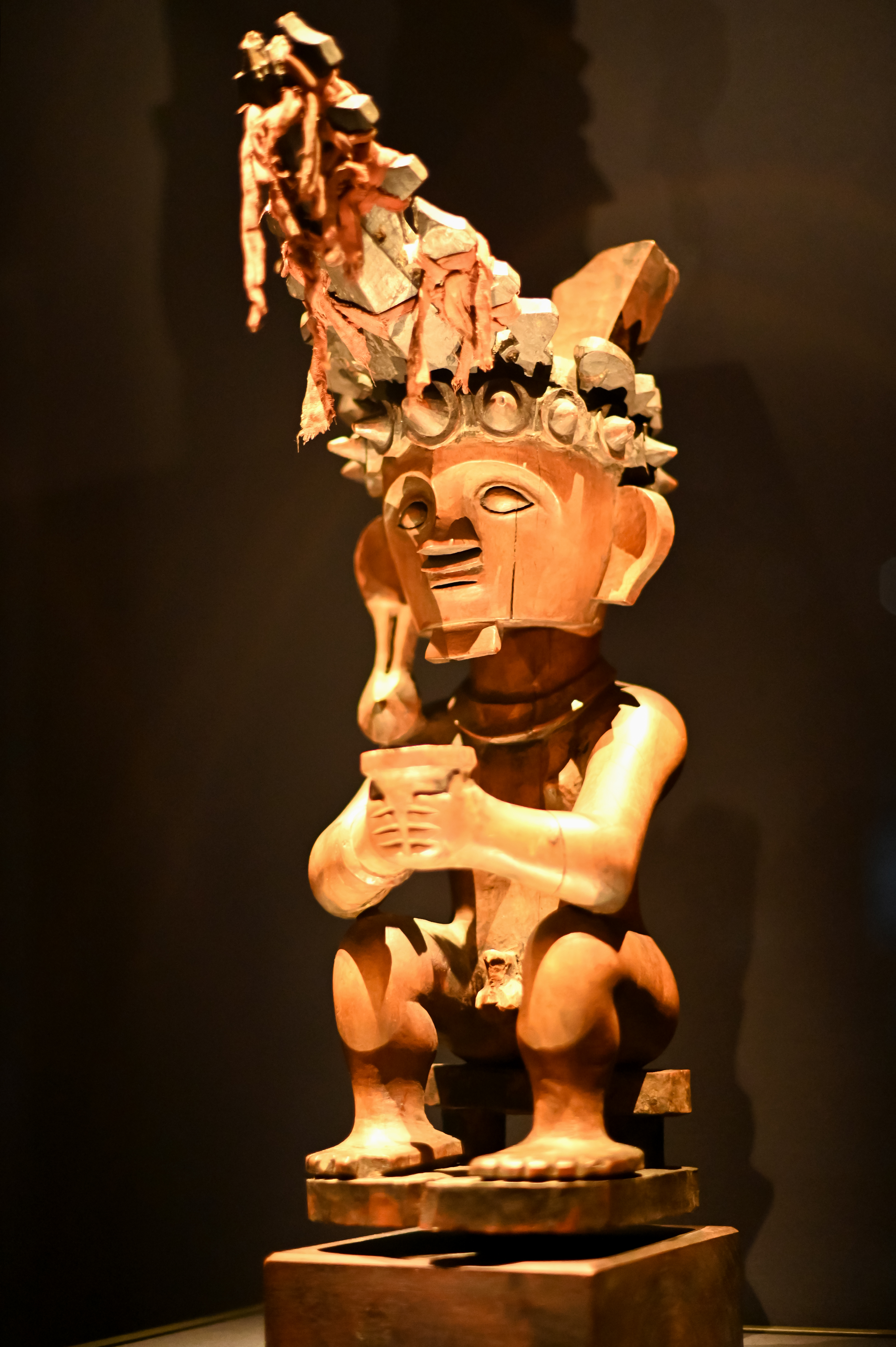
19th Century Ancestor Figure from Nias Island.

The Chinese collection is represented by fine Dehua porcelain figures, Taoist and Buddhistic statuary, export porcelain, calligraphy and other examples of decorative art.

The South Asian Galleries feature statuary from a range of periods, including Chola bronzes such as a sculpture of Uma, the consort of Shiva and of Somaskanda. The early Buddhist art of India is also represented by works hailing from the Mathura and Gandhara schools, including a rare sandstone Mathura Buddha dating to the Kanishka era, and the head of a Gandharan Bodhisattva. Other areas of note include South Indian woodwork, Nepali-Tibetan bronzes, textiles, late medieval miniatures and colonial prints.

The Southeast Asian collections are broad in scope and are rich in ethnological material. Representing the aristocratic art of ancient Southeast Asia are Khmer sculptures, Javanese temple sculpture (some on loan from Leiden), later Buddhist art from Burma/Thailand and the Sinicised temple art of Vietnam. Peranakan gold, textiles, tribal ornament and theatrical masks are other strengths of the collection.

The Khoo Teck Puat Gallery is the permanent home for the cargo recovered from the Tang Shipwreck, a sunken 9th century trading ship bound for Iran and Iraq, discovered in 1998 off Belitung Island in the Java Sea. The recovered cargo comprises more than 60,000 well-preserved ceramics produced in China during the Tang dynasty (618–907), as well as objects of gold and silver.

Certain gallery rooms are also used for temporary exhibitions. A recent exhibition included the display of Bronze Age masks from Sanxingdui, Sichuan Province, China.

On 25 June 2021, the museum launched an exhibition titled #SGFASHIONNOW. The exhibition, which is a collaboration between Lasalle College of the Arts' School of Fashion and the Textile and Fashion Federation (TaFF), is the first by the museum to showcase contemporary Singapore fashion.

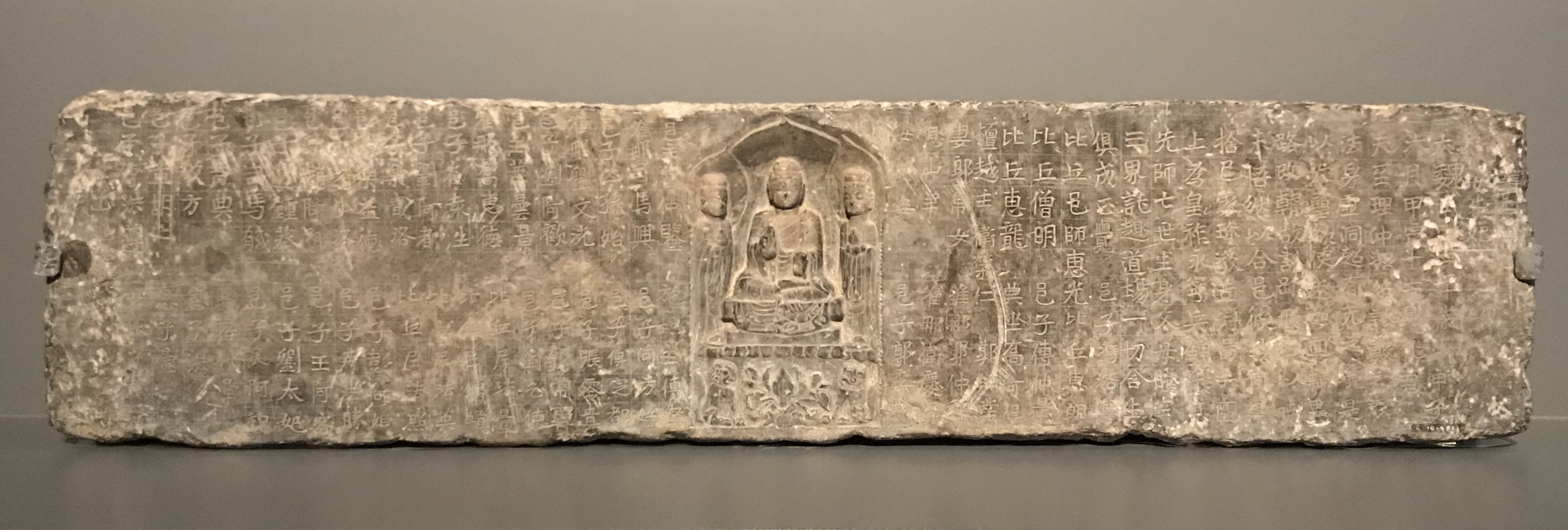
Eastern Wei Buddhist stele

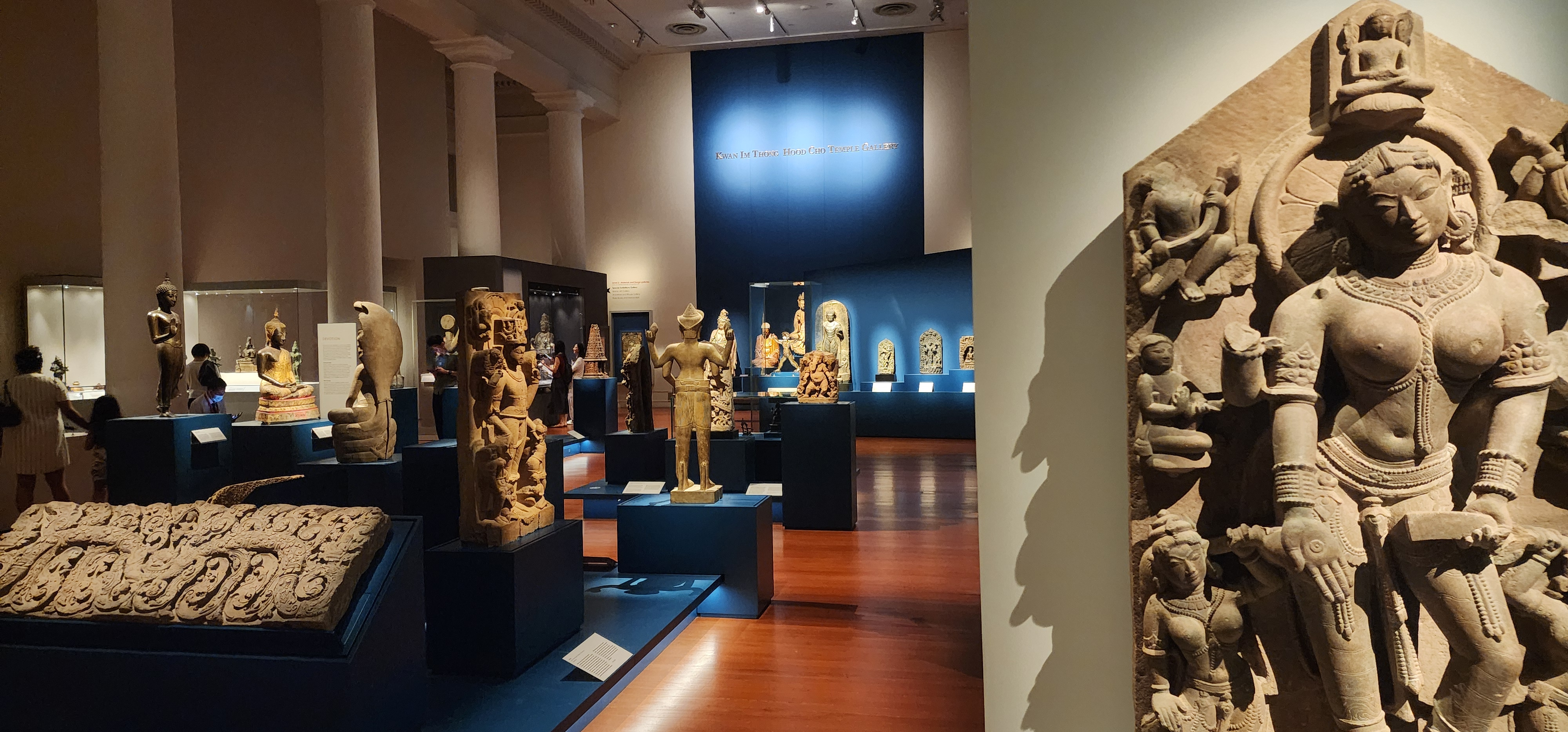
Kwan Im Thong Hood Cho Temple Gallery, Asian Civilizations Museum

== Museum Directors ==
- Dr Kenson Kwok (1997 - 2009)
- Dr Alan Chong (2010 - 2016)
- Kennie Ting (2016 - 2024)
- Clement Onn (2024 - )

== Facilities ==
The museum has a restaurant, Empress, featuring traditional Chinese dishes in a contemporary setting, and a café, Baker & Cook ACM, offering all day dining. There are ballrooms and halls available for functions. The museum shop has souvenirs and a wide range of books on Asian art.

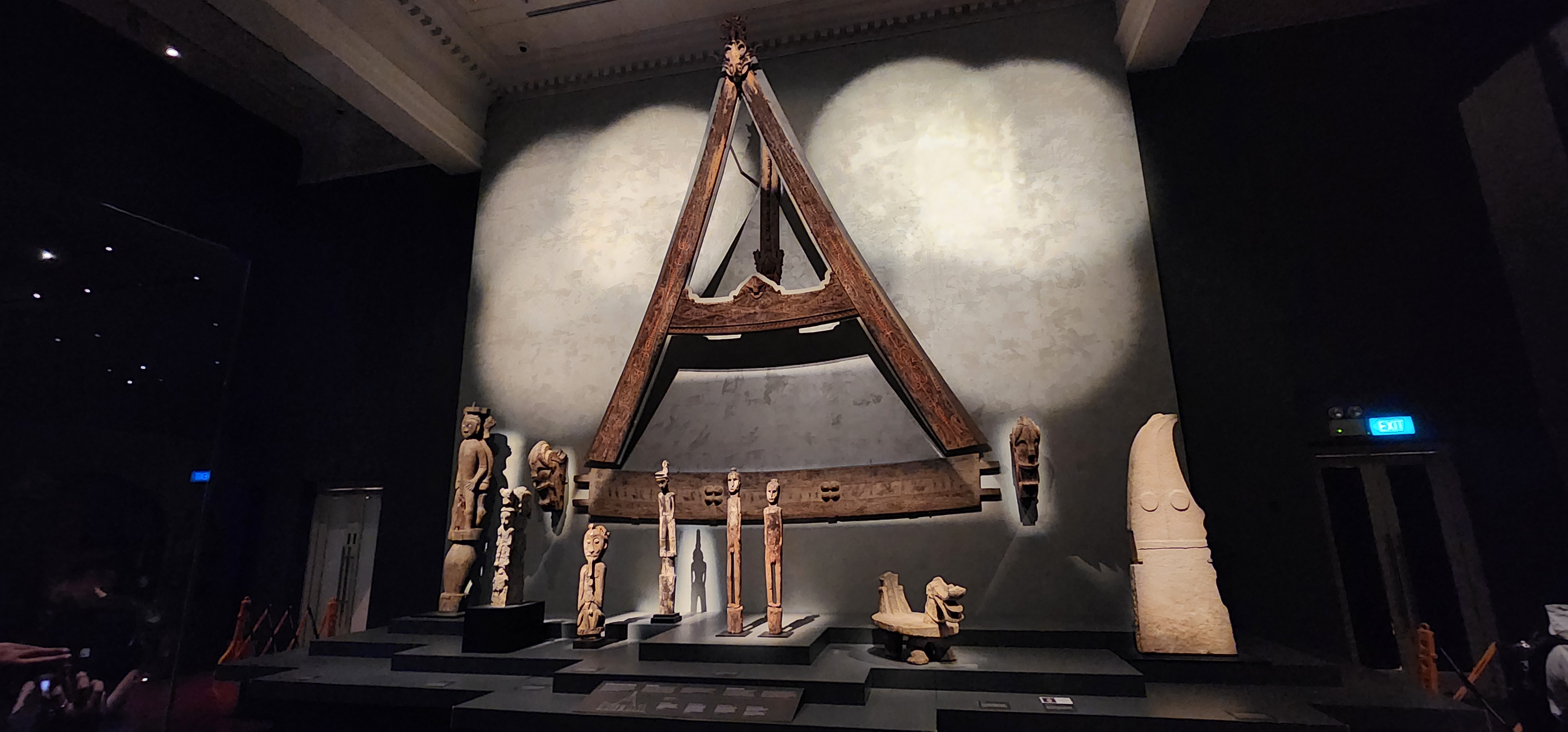
Granary facade parts from Toba Batak, Sumatra, Indonesia, early 20th century.

== Bibliography ==
- Lenzi, Iola (2004). Museums of Southeast Asia. Singapore: Archipelago Press. p. 200 pages. ISBN 981-4068-96-9.
