= Peranakan Museum =

Museum in Singapore

- Chinese: 土生文化馆; Malay: Muzium Peranakan; Tamil: பெரனாகன் அருங்காட்சியகம்

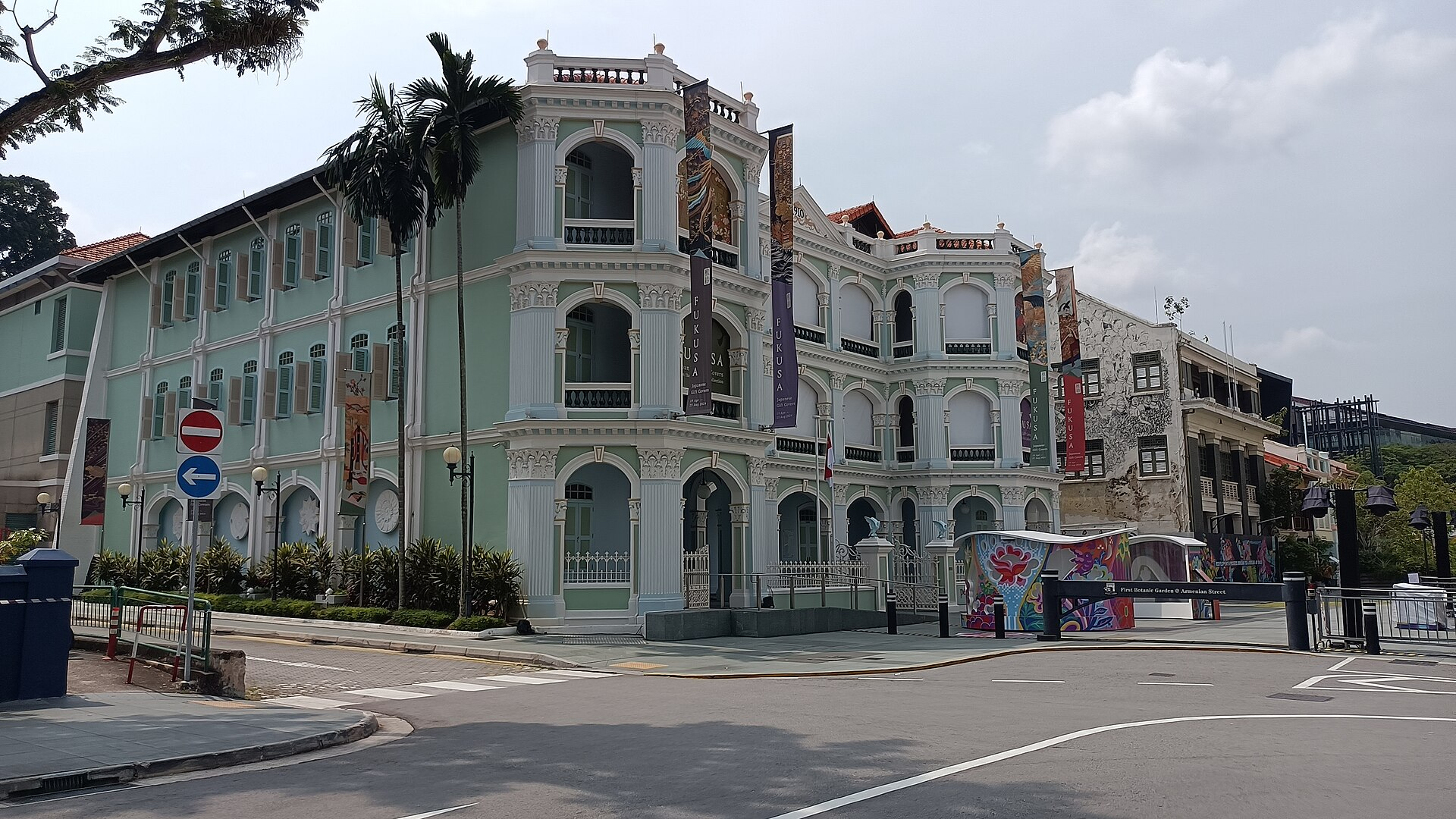
- Established: 25 April 2008; 18 years ago
- Location: Old Tao Nan School; 39 Armenian Street, Singapore 179941
- Coordinates: 1°17′39.2″N 103°50′56.9″E
- Type: Peranakan heritage of Singapore
- Curator: National Heritage Board
- Public transit access: NS25 EW13 City Hall; CC2 Bras Basah; DT21 Bencoolen
- Website: peranakanmuseum.org.sg

The Peranakan Museum is a museum and gallery in the Museum district of Singapore that specialises in the country's Peranakan culture. It is the sister museum of the Asian Civilisations Museum.

Conceived in 2006, it is the only museum of its kind in the world, exploring the history of Peranakan cultures in Singapore as well as other Peranakan communities in Southeast Asia. It is housed at the Old Tao Nan School building on Armenian Street, which once served as an extended wing to the artefact collection of the Asian Civilisations Museum.

== History ==
On 1 January 2006, the museum, then known as ACM 1 closed the Armenian Street wing for a major revamp. At its closure, the museum management chose Peranakan culture theme over a children's museum and a Chinese ceramic museum as their new showcase in the Tao Nan School space. This enabled the museum to house the world's most distinctive and comprehensive Peranakan museum collection of artifacts and wares, with a potential annual visitorship numbers of 112,000 people.

Furthermore, the revamp enabled 25 per cent more exhibition space for contextual displays for different aspects of Peranakan home and lifestyle. It also includes plans for Peranakan-themed eateries and shops in the row of four shop-houses adjacent to its building.

The museum officially opened on 25 April 2008, with ten permanent galleries showcasing main themes of Peranakan life. A central feature of the museum is the Peranakan Wedding Bed which once belonged to Mrs. Quah Hong Chiam of Penang, and the very bed where she gave birth to the first seven of her 11 children.

On 1 April 2019, the museum was closed for renovations works, which is expected to be completed by 2022. The museum reopened on 17 February 2023.

== Galleries ==
The different galleries are found in the following manner:

- Gallery 1 (Level 1)
- Galleries 2 – 5 (Level 2)
- Galleries 6 – 10 (Level 3)
- Special Exhibitions Galleries (Level 3)

Gallery 1 is titled Origins, and provides an introduction to Peranakan culture and to various Peranakan communities in Singapore, Malacca, Penang and Southeast Asia. Visitors to the subsequent rooms will learn about the story of the traditional 12-day Peranakan wedding, where significant ceremonies like the lap chai (exchange of gifts) and chiu thau (coming of age) are presented. Visitors can also see the elaborate wedding chamber and a wedding procession taking place indoors on Level 2.

Gallery 6, tilted Nonya, features the arts and crafts of Nonyas like beadwork, along with a display on the Nonya kebaya, and the womenfolks' role of transmitting cultural values to Peranakan children. Gallery 7 shows Religion, on Peranakans and their faiths. Gallery 8 illustrates the commerce, politics and social affairs of prominent Peranakans in Singapore's history in this exhibition titled Public Life. Gallery 9 on Food and Feasting, provides a grand banquet setting with the world's best collection of nonya porcelain.

Finally, the visual experience concludes with an introspection of modern Peranakans and how they feel about their heritage and the future of their culture in Gallery 10 (Conversations). Additional Special Exhibitions Galleries also features changing specific-themed exhibitions.

== Gallery ==
Peranakan Museum's central piece of display, the Peranakan Wedding Bed. Mrs. Quah gave birth to the first seven of her 11 children on this very bed

Father and Kid Statue

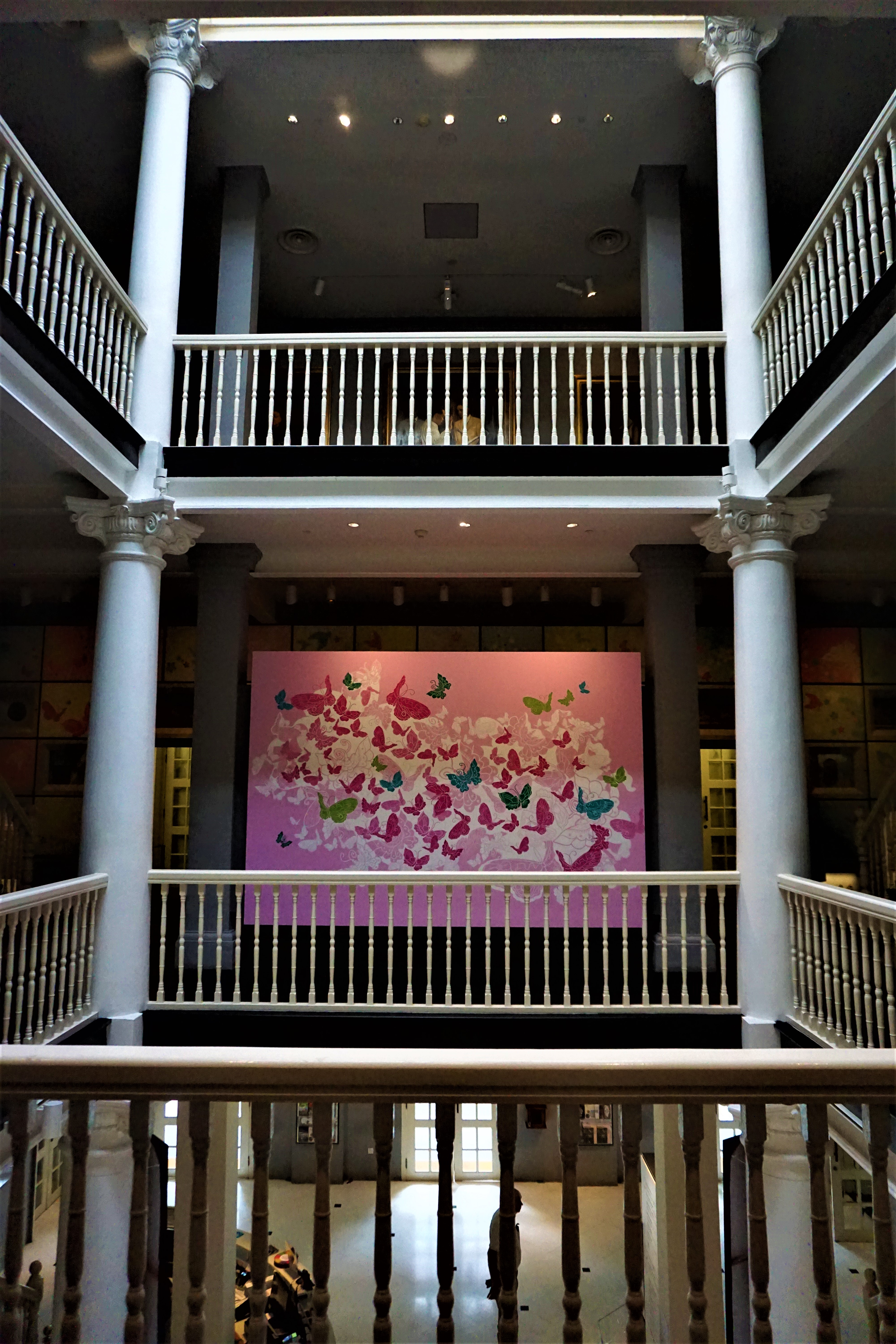
The museum's interior

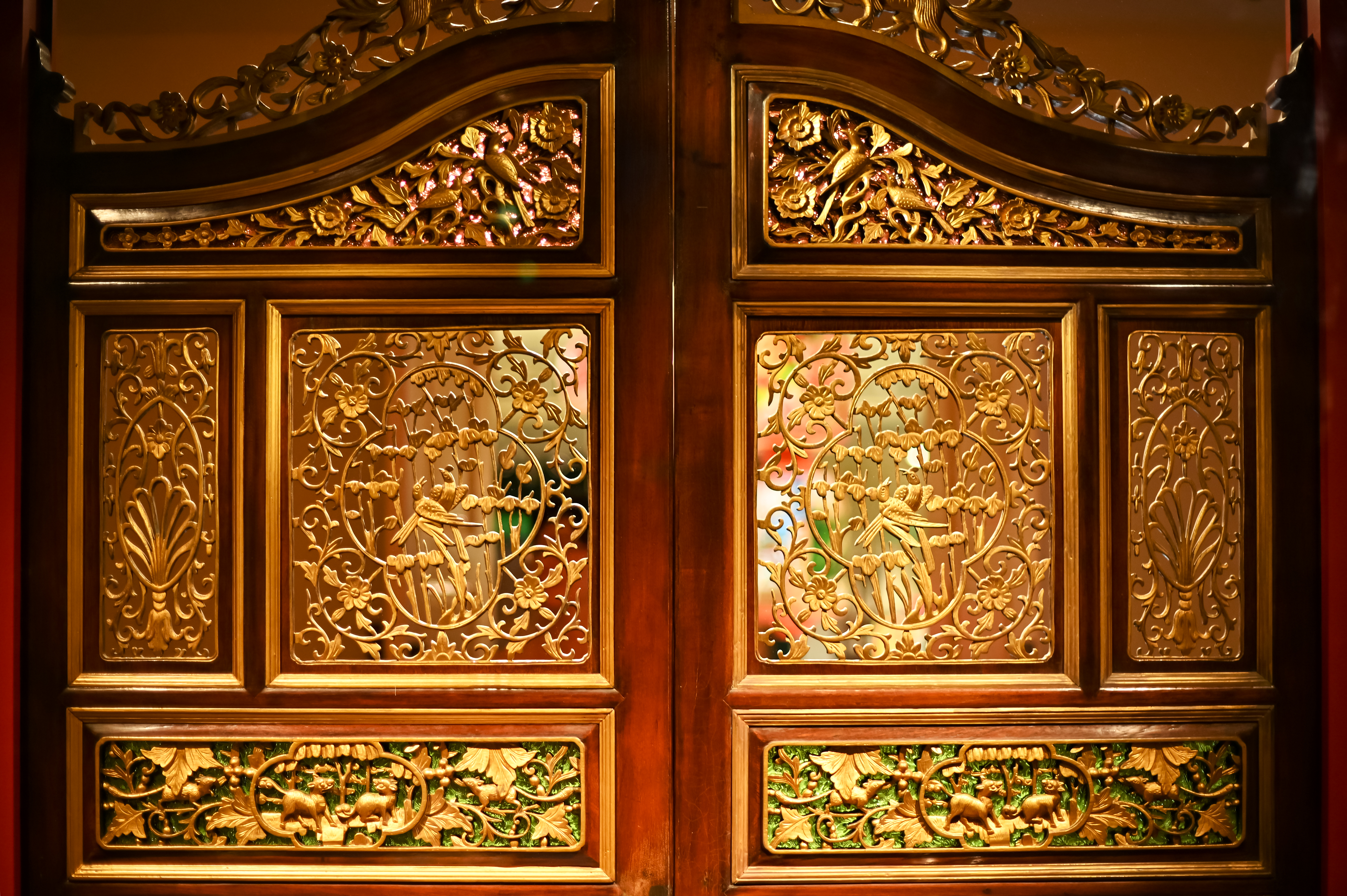
The ornate Pintu Pagar, or "Outer Gate," of a historical Peranakan home.

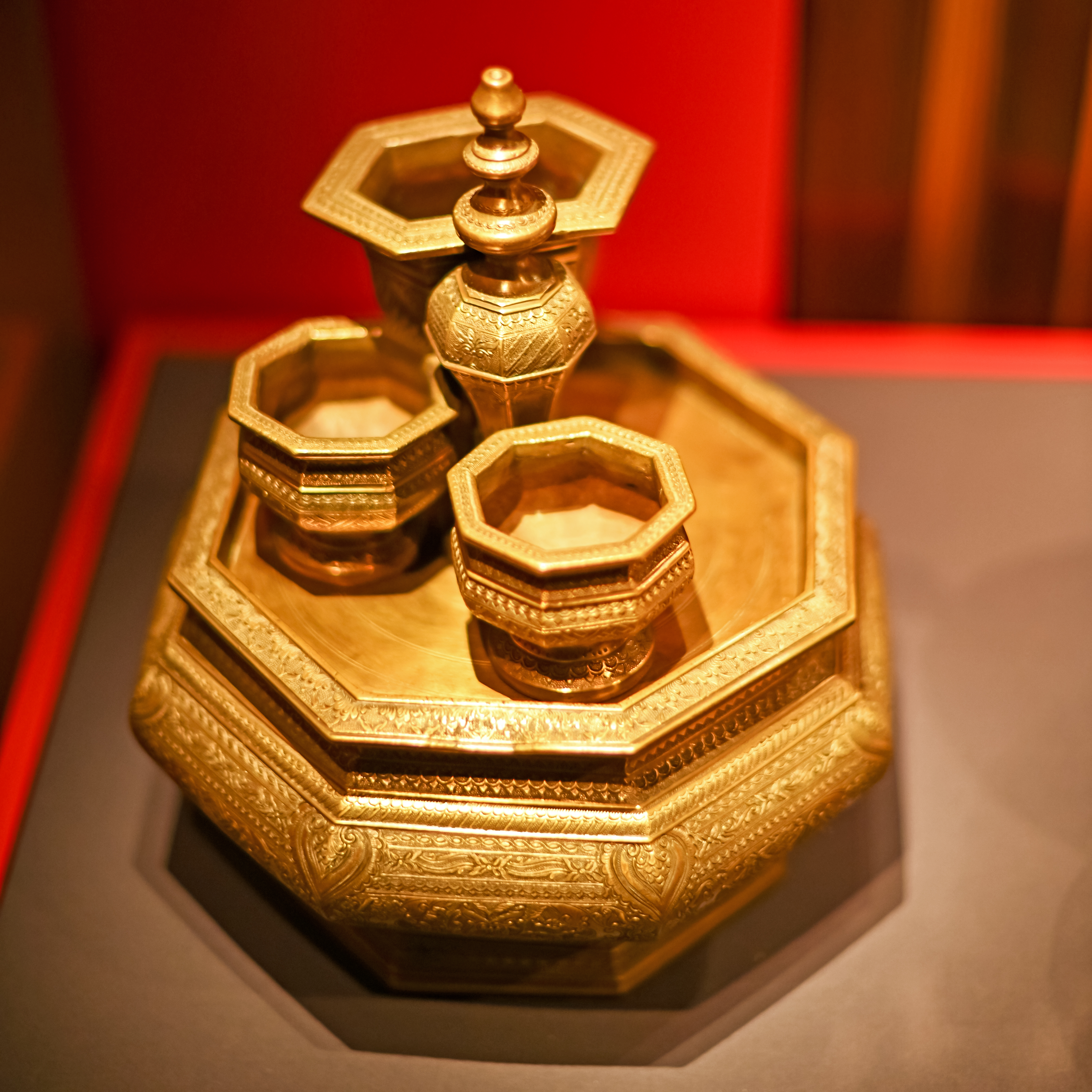
Sireh Set (For Betel Chewing)

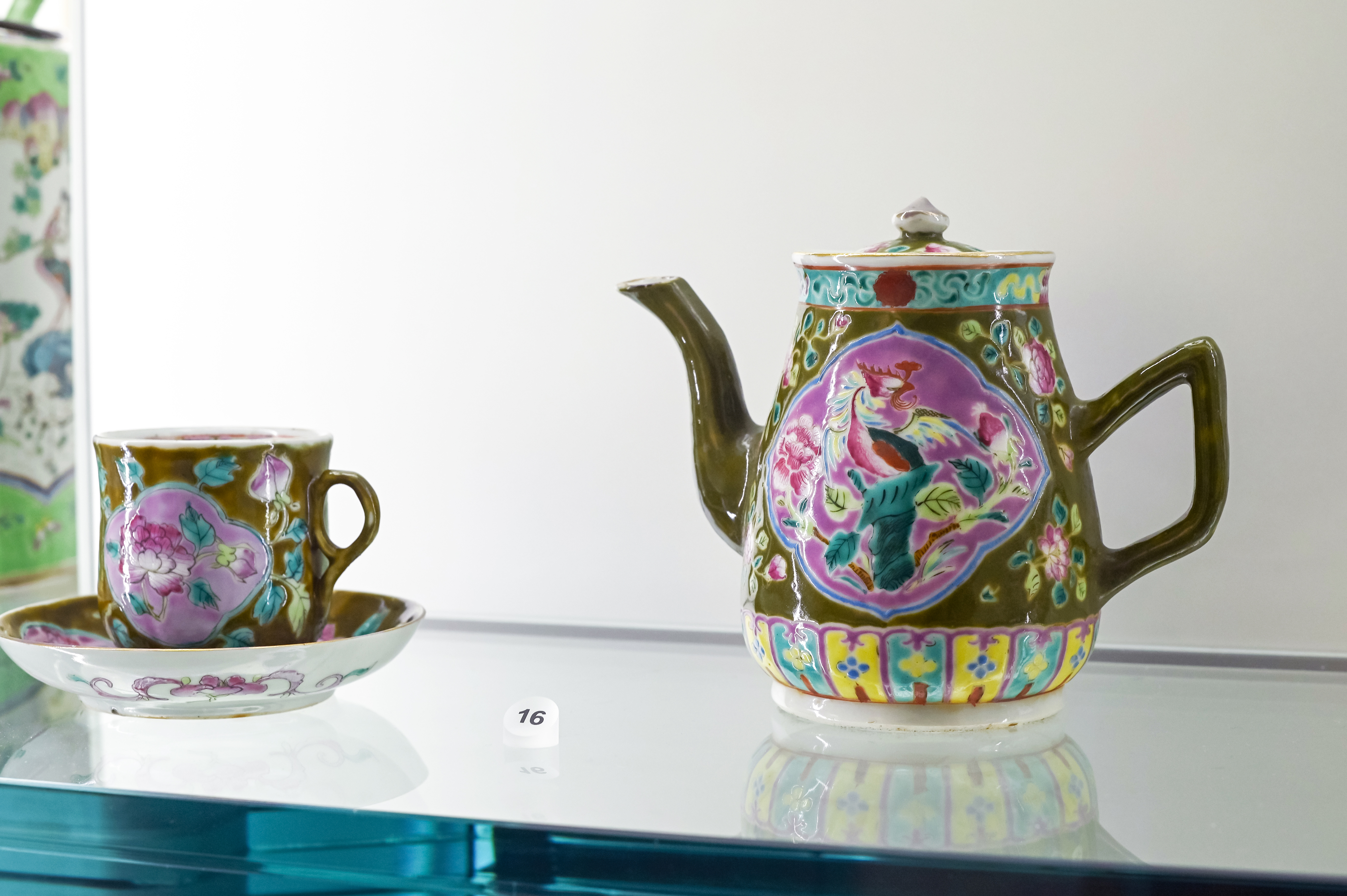
Nyonyaware—intricately decorated fine porcelain

== See also ==
- Baba House
- NUS Museum
