= People Like Us (Singapore) =

LGBT advocacy group in Singapore

People Like Us (PLU) (Chinese:我等之辈) is a gay equality lobby group in Singapore. Formed in 1993, it is an informal association of LGBT (lesbian, gay, bisexual, transgender) and heterosexual allies. Having been twice rejected by the government board which approves or prohibits organisations, the Registrar of Societies, it is now in its third incarnation as "PLU3". The term "PLU" has also gradually become slang for "homosexual" amongst members of Singapore's and Malaysia's gay subculture.

According to Joseph Lo, one of the earliest organiser of PLU, PLU aspires to be a space where gay, lesbian, and bisexual Singaporeans can "come together to help and support each other," leading the organization to coordinate discussion forums and social events for community building.

== Early years ==
From 1993 to 1996, PLU held monthly Sunday forums at The Substation. A topic would be chosen and a lead speaker found. Forum attendees also divided themselves into smaller break-out groups to discuss issues on a more personal level. Topics varied widely, including coming out of the closet, the law, insurance for singles, housing, and safe sex, along with lighter topics such as "homosexuals and beauty". Attendance ranged between 40 and 80 people for each forum.

An initial application to the Registrar of Societies for official recognition of the group was submitted by 10 members, two of whom were heterosexual, on 7 November 1996, and rejected without specification of reason on 8 April 1997. PLU subsequently submitted an appeal to the Minister for Home Affairs and the Prime Minister, which was rejected in May 1997.

== PLU2 ==
In 1999, members organized a "Millennium Project Forum" to discuss the status and experiences of gay people in Singapore.

A re-founding meeting in 2003 gathered together over 100 participants, but questions remained about future potential for recognition and strategy.

Lo, initially at the helm in organising and conducting PLU's activities, gradually took a back seat after Alex Au came on board. Au subsequently became the motive force behind PLU and the identifiable face of gay activism in Singapore, helping to reconstitute PLU in its later incarnations, earning him a gay award from Utopia in 2002.

== PLU3 ==
In February 2005, Mandarin-language Channel U broadcast a programme on the topic of "Do homosexuals have space for their activities?" This was the first time that the views of leading gay activists, in this case Eileena Lee and Charles Tan from PLU3, were given a relatively lengthy airing on primetime television (see List of Singaporean LGBTQ documentaries).

In 2010 PLU participated in compiling a report on the human rights situation in Singapore to be submitted in advance of the first United Nations review of human rights in Singapore. PLU also concluded an online survey of LGBT voters in Singapore in 2010 to ascertain issues of political importance to the Singaporean gay community.

== Impact and legacy ==
Joseph Lo and Huang Guoqin edited the book People Like Us: Sexual Minorities in Singapore (2003), a collection of essays, articles, and other materials from the history of the association. Lo said the book "could function as a manifesto providing new goals and directions for the community."

A popular web series named People Like Us, about fictional gay men in Singapore, was released in 2017 and continued through 2024.

== See also ==
- LGBTQ rights in Singapore
- LGBTQ history in Singapore
- List of LGBTQ organisations in Singapore
