= John C. Goss =

American artist and author (born 1958)

John C. Goss (born October 21, 1958, in Landstuhl, Germany) is an American artist and author and has lived most of his life in the Asia/Pacific region (Hawaii, California, Thailand).

== Education and early career ==
He received his MFA from California Institute of the Arts in 1984 and his BFA summa cum laude from Northern Illinois University in 1981. He also studied at the University of California, San Diego from 1981-1982. In 1989 he received a National Endowment for the Arts fellowship and was nominated for the Herb Alpert Award in the Arts in 1998.

His video and photographic works have been exhibited around the world, including the Whitney Museum of American Art, the American Film Institute, Hirshhorn Museum, the Berlin Film Festival, Pacific Film Archive, Walker Arts Center, San Francisco Museum of Modern Art, Hong Kong Arts Centre, International Center of Photography, The National Gallery of Canada, Massachusetts Institute of Technology, Institut d'Estudis Nord-Americans Barcelona, Museum of Fine Arts Boston, Harvard and Yale universities. Reviews of his work have appeared in October, Camera Obscura, Jump Cut, Artweek, Afterimage, and the New Art Examiner.

An early innovator in computer art, he created queer selfies using the Apple II in the late 70s and the first gay-themed hyper text novel, Devil's Lava Lamp Now, in 1992 on the Amiga. Some of those early experimental self-portraits from the video, Digital Reflections (a collaboration with Frank Deitrich and Deborah Gorchos), were exhibited at the Computer Culture Art Show at SIGGRAPH 1981.

In 1989, Goss collaborated with artists' Alan Pulner and Richard Zvonar to create Rapture Stations in the Virtual Funhouse, an interactive, computer-manipulated environment, at the Santa Monica Museum of Art. Described as a hyper-media theater machine, Goss conceptualized an innovative HyperCard "A.I. Ringmaster" that manipulated the exhibition in real time. Providing a controllable degree of randomness, the software could generate new theatrical scenes by scrambling existing text. It also generated an ever-changing environment, controlling on/off and fade levels for lighting, slide projectors, toys, MIDI sound settings, and everyday appliances. The soundscape used live samples of performers, messages phoned into the museum, and a record player available for use by the audience. Artists were invited to remotely contribute art and text which descended in from the museum's Fax machine hung from the ceiling.

In 1990, Goss staged his performance work, Forbidden Planet, at Highways in Santa Monica, CA, on Jan 25, 26, 27, and Feb 3, 4. The multi-media theatrical presentation examined sex and intimacy in the age of AIDS and telecommunications. Altaira Morbius, lead character from the sci-fi classic, Forbidden Planet, resumes her story after arriving on Earth in the midst of an epidemic and social upheaval. With cameos from Calvin Klein, Perry Ellis, Michael Jackson and Jesus (come again, now a Latino patient in a hospital's AIDS ward), Altaira decides that uptight Earth is the real forbidden planet and re-uses parts from her robot to create a global phone sex network to heal the planet.

== Special effects design ==
As a designer Goss created concert tour effects for Neil Diamond, George Michael, Deep Purple and Rush; theme park effects for Disney World and Disneyland; large-scale multi-media features for Caesars Palace and Luxor Hotel in Las Vegas; and special effects for international Expo pavilions (1986, 1988 and 1993).

== Activism ==
In the late 1980s/early 1990s Goss was a member of a Los Angeles-based collective of anonymous artists who created visual and performance components for various ACT UP Los Angeles demonstrations and HIV/AIDS awareness events in Los Angeles, Ohio, and Chicago. The collective changed names for each action and was variously known as The Tribe, The Altered Boys, Stiff Sheets, Bad Seed, and Fags in Flags.

In 1992 he produced a documentary and music video on AIDS/HIV educational efforts in Bangkok, Thailand.

In 1994, Goss and partners opened Southeast Asia's first gay and lesbian center, Utopia, in Bangkok. In 1995 he created the online Utopia, the Internet's first Asian gay and lesbian resource portal.

== Later career ==
His photographs appeared in the landmark pop cultural book, Very Thai (River Books Press Dist A C, 2005, by Philip Cornwel-Smith) with a second edition in 2013; and he authored 10 guidebook titles about LGBT life in Asia (2005–2007).

In the summer of 2007 he worked in Los Angeles as a production designer, art director (director of concept design) for the feature motion picture, Red Velvet. He also created digital effects, helmed second unit direction (the alligator scene), designed the movie poster, DVD cover, merchandise, and website graphics for the film.

In 2010, Goss moved to Palm Springs, California where he opened a home studio/gallery, Swank Modern Design. Swank Modern's inaugural exhibition, The Sensual World, featured photographs by Goss shot in Thailand, Singapore, Sri Lanka and Cambodia. He was also a member of the Advisory Board for the three-volume Greenwood Encyclopedia of LGBT Issues Worldwide published this same year.

Beginning is 2014, he published 18 large format portfolios of his photography from the preceding two decades: Observatory (Vol 1); Desert Modern (Vol 2); Find China (Vol 3); Mykonos (Vol 4); I, Japan (Vol 5); Thai Love Song (Vol 6); Wonder Walls (Vol 7); India: At First Sight (Vol 8); Tropical Regard II (Vol 9); Sri Lanka (Vol 10); My Penang (Vol 11); Offerings (Vol 12); Black Album (Vol 13); Singapore (Vol 14); Blossom World (Vol 15); Hawaii (Vol 16); Strange Fruit (Vol 17); and Full Spectrum (Vol 18).

In early 2019 he joined, and performs hula with, Kūhai Hālau O Kala'alohiikamakaokalaua'e Pā 'Ōlapa Kahiko under the guidance of kumu hula Carla Kala'alohiikamakaokalaua'e Culbertson, helping to perpetuate Hawaiian cultural heritage in the lineage of Frank Kawaikapuokalani Hewett as passed down from 'Iolani Luahine, Edith Kanaka'ole, Emma DeFries, and family cultural practitioners.

In early 2022, he was production designer for a new play by Joe Moe, Deny We Were, that premiered on May 11 at Wild Project in New York City. He also completed a two year graphic design packaging project for the Anthems & Antithets 4-disc collection of 88 new songs by Los Angeles composer, Brian Woodbury. That summer he performed with his hula hālau in Nā Pilina (Connections), a hula showcase, at the Palm Springs Cultural Center.

In June, 2023, Goss and his husband published a magazine format cookbook and interior design showcase, Asian Home, the first of three planned volumes (including Desert Home and Holiday Home). He directs, and they perform together in, a music video, Cold Genius Aria - The Cold Song or What Power Art Thou by Henry Purcell.

In 2024, Goss directed three music videos -- Father Neptune, One by One (Walking in the Dark), and Honey Bee -- based on songs by 1950s American singer/songwriter, Connie Converse, performed by Hope Levy. He also performed as Father Neptune in the video of the same name. That fall he performed kahiko and 'auana hula at the annual 'Hula Hiehie O Na Kupuna Festival' in Laguna Woods.

In 2025, Goss completed design and coloring for Brian Woodbury's comic book, Theseus Rex. He designed the poster for Joe Moe's new play, Good Mourning. He contributed historical research, video production, and performed in his hālau's hō'ike, 'Ike Aku, 'Ike Mai, a timeline of hula and Hawaiian music from the 1800s to the present.

== Personal life ==
In September 2013, Goss married Amarin Ratanarat, his longtime partner since 1996.

In February 2020, Goss confirmed his biological father, Grant Mitchell Salzman, through DNA testing and is also related to Harry Saltzman, producer of the early James Bond films.

== Filmography ==
Year	Title	Role
2025	Shobijin Sing the Mothra Song (music video)	Director, Editor, performer
2024	Christmas Time is Here: Sinister Victorian Christmas Greetings (music video)	Director, Editor, performer
2024	One by One by Connie Converse (music video)	Director, Editor
2024	Father Neptune by Connie Converse (music video)	Director, Editor, performer
2024	Honeybee by Connie Converse (music video)	Director, Editor
2023	Cold Genius Aria - The Cold Song or What Power Art Thou by Henry Purcell (music video)	Director, Editor, performer
2023	Hōpoe (video short)	Director, Editor, performer
2022	Where It Came From (music video by Brian Woodbury)	A.I. imagery, effects animation
2022	Ula No Weo (video short)	Director, Editor, performer
2022	Naue Ana La (video short)	Director, Editor, performer
2022	Kaimana Hila (video short)	Director, Editor, performer
2021	Nana Del Caballo Grande (video short)	Director, Editor, performer
2021	Kū Ka Pūnohu 'Ula I Ka Moana / Ka Ua I Hāmakua (video short)	Director, Editor, performer
2019	Kāne'ohe (video short)	Director, Editor, performer
2019	The Rocky Horror Silent Movie Show (video short)	Director, Editor, performer
2008	Red Velvet (feature film)	Production Designer, Art Director (Director of Concept Design), digital animation (uncredited), 2nd Unit Direction on alligator pit scene (uncredited), plus design for the movie poster, DVD cover, website graphics, and merchandise.
2000	Somatography by Erika Suderburg (video)	composer
1999	Guinevere (feature film)	cameo: man catching collapsing girl at party (uncredited)
1993	Wrecked for Life: The Trip and Magic of Trocadero Transfer (video)	Producer, Director
1992	Flowing Hearts: Thailand Fights AIDS (video)	Producer, Director
1992	Bangkok (Fighting AIDS) (video short)	Producer, Director
1992	Flying Saucers Over Hollywood: the Plan 9 Companion (feature film)	digital animation
1989	"Out" Takes (video)	Producer, Director
1989	Stiff Sheets (video)	Producer, Director
1986	He's Like (video)	Producer, Director
1986	Virtual Cockpits of Tomorrow (video)	Producer, Director, performer
1985	Wild Life (video)	Producer, Director
1983	Extremities (digital/video short)	Director
1983	Celeb-ration (video short)	Producer, Director, performer
1981	Presentiments (film/video short)	Producer, Director
1981	Be There, Aloha (film/video short)	Producer, Director
1981	Digital Reflections I with Frank Dietrich and Deborah Gorchos (digital/video short)	performer/soundtrack
1981	Digital Reflections II with Frank Dietrich and Deborah Gorchos (digital/video short)	performer/soundtrack
1980	Boys Will Be Beuys (video short)	Producer, Director
1980	Language Exercise (video short)	Director
1980	Art Attack/Making Art (video short)	Producer, Director
1980	Glasses (video short)	Producer, Director
1980	Fooling Myself (video short)	Producer, Director
1980	Dixie (video short)	Producer, Director
1980	Artbox (video short)	Producer, Director
1980	The Naked, the Damned, and Their Children (video short)	Producer, Director
1980	The Pilot (film/video short)	Producer, Director
1980	Yacking Media (film/video and sound installation)	Producer, Director
1980	Video Drawings (b/w video short)	Producer, Director
1980	Structure <--> Meaning (b/w video installation documentation)	Producer, Director
1980	Eclipse Piece (b/w video installation/performance documentation)	Producer, Director
1976	Anima-Fantastic (animated film, 1977 Hawai'i Film & Video Festival 1st Place and Audience Choice awards)	Director, Artist, Animator

== Performances ==
Year	Title	Role
2025	Hula Hiehie O Na Kupuna Festival, Laguna Woods, CA	performer, Noho Ana Laka I Ka Uluwehiwehi (oli), No Luna I Ka Halekai (hula kahiko), He'eia / Kāneʻohe (hula 'auana)
2025	'Ike Aku, 'Ike Mai, Hō'ike 2025, Sun City, CA	performer, Noho Ana Laka I Ka Uluwehiwehi (oli), No Luna I Ka Halekai (hula kahiko), A Lalo Māua o Waipi’o (mele 'āina), Halema’uma’u (hula kahiko), Ka'aahi Kahului (hula 'auana), Hi'ilawe (hula 'auana), Pidgin English Hula (hula 'auana), My Yellow Ginger Lei (hula 'auana), Kawailehuaa'alakahonua (hula 'auana), Eō E Ka Lahui (hula 'auana)
2024	Hula Hiehie O Na Kupuna Festival, Laguna Woods, CA	performer, Noho Ana Laka I Ka Uluwehiwehi (oli), No Luna I Ka Halekai (hula kahiko), Lehua Beauty / Kawailehuaa'alakahonua (hula 'auana)
2023	Kawaikapuokalani Hewett Day Hula Festival;	performer, Ke Ha'a La Puna (kahiko), Hōpoe ('auana)
2023	Hula Hiehie O Na Kupuna Festival, Laguna Woods, CA	performer, Aloha E Ka Laua'e O Makana (hula kahiko), Lei Ana Kaua'i (hula 'auana)
2022	Hula Hiehie O Na Kupuna Festival, Laguna Woods, CA	performer, Lonoikamakahiki (hula kahiko), E Ku'u Lei Hulu (hula 'auana)
2022	Nā Pilina (Connections), Palm Springs Cultural Center	performer, Lonoikamakahiki, Kawika, Ula No Weo, Aia I Molokai, and Ka Ua I Hāmākua (hula kahiko); E Kuʻu Sweet Lei Poina ʻOle, Kaimanahila, Kāneʻohe, E Kuʻu Lei Hulu, Kawailehua'aʻalakahonua, and He Waiwai Nui (hula 'auana)
2022	Kawaikapuokalani Hewett Day Hula Festival, online during Covid epidemic	performer, 'Ula Nō Weo (kahiko), Naue Ana La O Hōpoe ('auana)
2022	Deny We Were by Joe Moe, Fresh Fruit Festival, NYC, May 11, 13 & 14	Production Designer
2021	Masque Off!, Palm Springs	'Nana Del Caballo Grande' Director, performer
2021	Hula Hiehie O Na Kupuna Festival, online during Covid epidemic	performer, Ku Ka Pūnohu (oli), Ka Ua I Hāmākua I Ke Kai Opae'ula (hula kahiko solo), E Ku'u Lei Poni Mōʻī / E Ku'u Sweet Lei (hula 'auana)
2020	The Fraidy Bunch Haunted Campfire, Palm Springs	'Caleb Meyer' puppeteer, performer
2019	Hula Hiehie O Na Kupuna Festival, Laguna Woods, CA	performer, Aloha E Ka Lā (oli), Mai Kahiki Pele (hula kahiko), Naue Ana La O Hopoe E (hula 'auana)
2019	The Rocky Horror Silent Movie Show, Palm Springs	performer, 'There's a Light (Over at the Frankenstein Place)'
1992	Altered Boys, performance action in coordination with ACT UP/LA, Silverlake, Hollywood and Beverly Hills	contributing writer, performer
1990	Forbidden Planet, Highways, Santa Monica, CA, Jan 25, 26 & 27, Feb 3 & 4	Producer, Director, performer, author
1989	Against Nature: A Show by Homosexual Men, Beyond Baroque, Venice, CA, Jan 20	contributing writer, performer
1989	"1969, 1979, 1989," Highways, Santa Monica, CA, May 6	Producer, Director, performer
1989	Rapture Stations in the Virtual Funhouse, in collaboration with Alan Pulner and Richard Zvonar, Santa Monica Museum of Art, July 7–23	Co-Produver, Co-Director, design, contributing author
1989	ARDORILLNESSDEATHSALVATION, Highways, Santa Monica, CA, Nov 20	Producer, Director, performer
1989	Safeless, Jet Rag Warehouse, Los Angeles, Dec 8	Producer, Director, performer
1989	Stiff Sheets, Los Angeles and Chicago	contributing writer
1986	Pink Life, Randolf Street Gallery, Chicago, Dec 6, and LA Contemporary Dance Space	Producer, Director, solo performer
1986	Virtual Cockpits of Tomorrow, 7th Annual Los Angeles Choreographer's Showcase, Barnsdall Park Theater, Nov 6 & 7	Producer, Director, performer
1986	reMALE MOVES, LA Contemporary Dance Space	Producer, Director, performer
1981	Exotica! Far Away Stuff! Not Around Here Kind Things!, with Joe Moe, Sushi Performance & Visual Art, San Diego	Co-Producer, Co-Director, performer, co-author
1980	Art-a-lectics, Northern Illinois University Art Gallery	Producer, Director

== Selected bibliography ==
- 'Kyoto Journal' #83, July 2015
- 'The Greenwood Encyclopedia of LGBT Issues Worldwide' Vol 1 - 3, 2010, edited by Chuck Stewart. Advisory Board.
- 'Sacred Asia', Fah Thai, Nov-Dec, 2006, pp. 74–82
- 'Irony and Dissembling: Queer Tactics for Experimental Documentary' by Kathleen McHugh, Between the Sheets, in the Streets: Queer, Lesbian, and Gay Documentary, 1997
- 'Entropy, History, Space and Speeding Cars' by Erika Suderburg, Los Angeles, Editions Autrement, Paris, 1993
- 'Life in the Media World' by Greg Schneider, Artweek, Volume 22, number 17, May 2, 1991, p. 17
- 'Youthful Persuasions: John Goss Speaks Out' by Gabriel Gomez, Afterimage. Nov 1990, p. 9
- 'John Goss: Forbidden Planet' by Lance Carlson, High Performance, Summer 1990, p. 61
- 'Performance Art as Political Activism' by Lance Carlson, Artweek Focus, May 3, 1990, p. 23
- 'Virtual Art, Virtual Fun' by Jan Breslauer, LA Weekly, Jul 21-Jul 27, 1989, p. 39
- 'Funhouse Explores Mortal Passageways' by Zan Dubin, Los Angeles Times, Calendar, Sun, July 9, 1989
- 'October', number 43, Winter, 1987
- 'The Sissy Boy, the Fat Ladies and the Dykes' by Alexander Doty, Camera Obscura, number 25-26, p. 125
- 'Wild Life: Collaborative Process and Gay Identity' by Gabriel Gomez, Jump Cut, number 37, pp. 82–87
- 'John Goss/John Greyson' by Jamitre Trott, New Art Examiner, Dec, 1987.
