= Section 377A (Singapore) =

Defunct Singaporean law prohibiting sex between males

Section 377A was a law in Singapore that criminalised sex between consenting adult males. It was introduced under British colonial rule in 1938 when it was added to the Penal Code by the colonial government. It remained a part of the Singapore body of law after the Penal Code review of 2007 which removed most of the other provisions in Section 377. It was subsequently repealed in its entirety in 2023.

Prior to the repeal, Section 377A, while retained de jure in the Penal Code, had been for many years de facto unenforced – there had been no convictions for sex between consenting male adults in decades. While a small number of people were convicted under the law for private consensual acts between adults from 1988 until 2007, enforcement effectively ceased outright following the Penal Code review, despite the law being formally retained until 2022.

On 28 February 2022, the Court of Appeal of the Supreme Court of Singapore reaffirmed that 377A could not be used to prosecute men for having gay sex. That same year, an Ipsos survey found that 44% of Singapore residents supported retaining the law, with 20% opposing it and the remaining 36% being ambivalent. On 21 August 2022, Prime Minister Lee Hsien Loong announced during the annual National Day Rally that the government intended to repeal Section 377A, ending criminalisation de jure. On 29 November 2022, the Parliament of Singapore passed a bill to repeal Section 377A. The law was formally repealed after the bill was assented by President Halimah Yacob on 27 December 2022 and gazetted on 3 January 2023.

== Background ==
=== The Indian Penal Code ===
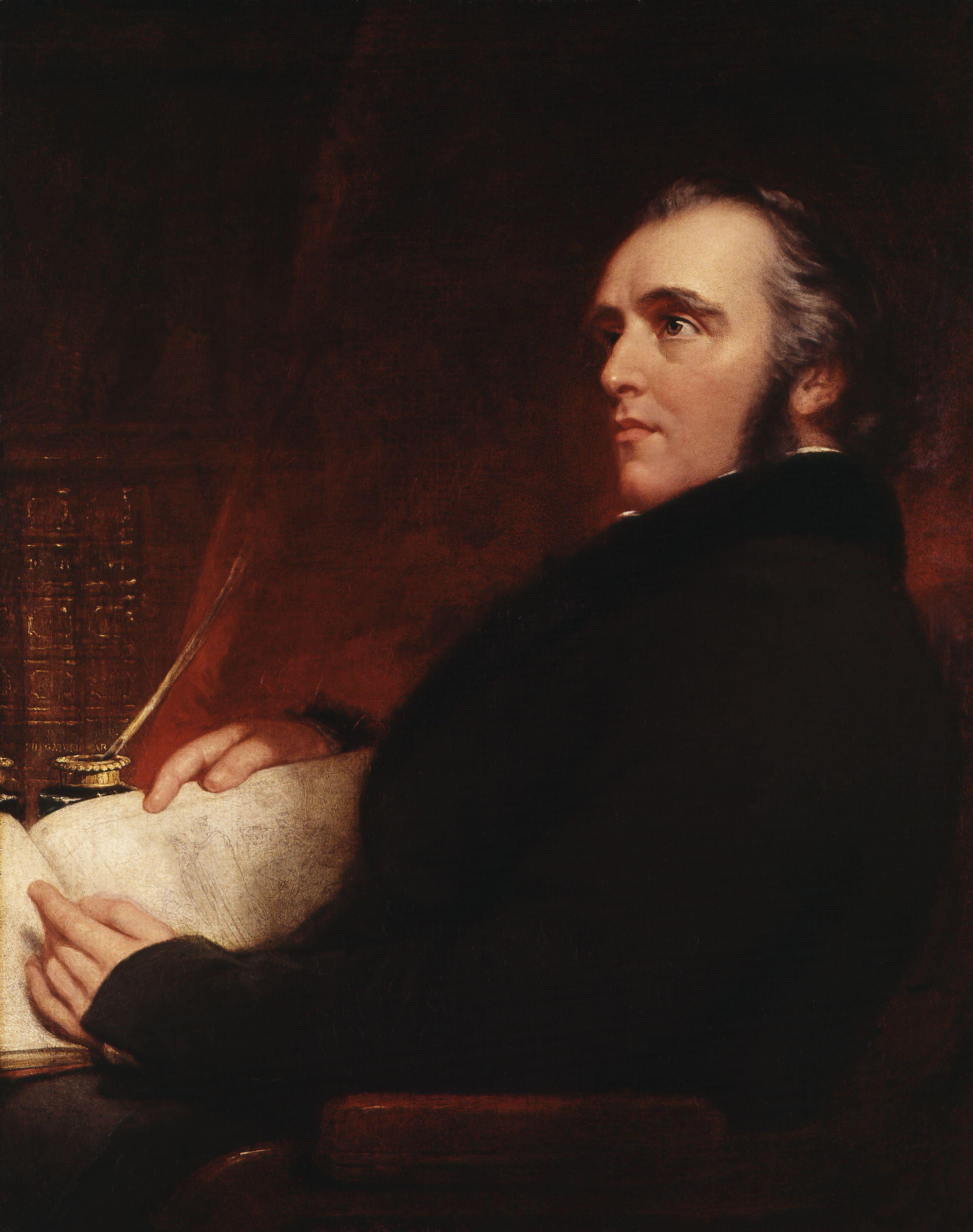
Lord Thomas Macaulay, who chaired the commission that introduced laws such as 377A.

The British Parliament formed the Indian Law Commission in 1833. Lord Thomas Macaulay was appointed to chair the commission. The 1837 draft of the Indian Penal Code was largely his work. It took 23 years for his work to be reviewed by the commission and the Supreme Court judges in Mumbai, Calcutta, and Madras. The code was adopted in 1860 and took effect 1 January 1862.

Macaulay's draft did not reflect existing Indian (or other Asian cultures) laws or customs. It was largely a rewrite of the British Royal Commission's 1843 draft code. The adopted draft included a Section 377 (quoted above), but there were many ambiguities in the section, including the question of what had to penetrate what. These in turn let future jurists redefine what these provisions actually punished. Under Buddhist and Hindu law in most of Asia, consensual intercourse between members of the same sex was never an offence. In the new Indian Penal Code, however, Section 377 criminalised "carnal intercourse against the order of nature", derived from words attributed to Sir Edward Coke in the seventeenth century.

Section 377A "(Outrages on decency" was added to the sub-title "Unnatural offences" in the Straits Settlements in 1938. Both sections were absorbed unchanged into the Singapore Penal Code when the latter was passed by Singapore's Legislative Council on 28 January 1955.

=== Original Section 377 ===
Unnatural sex or sodomy was not defined in the Indian Penal Code drafted by the British. Legal records show that Indian legislators in the 19th and early 20th centuries interpreted "carnal intercourse against the order of nature" between individuals (of all sexes – the law being non-gender specific with its use of the word "whoever") to include anal sex, bestiality and, often after much courtroom deliberation, oral sex as well, i.e. any form of sexual penetration which did not have the potential for procreation.

Therefore, both heterosexual and homosexual oral and anal sex were criminal offences. In this particular positive sense, Section 377 did not discriminate against homosexuals, although the permission of vaginal penetration left homosexuals exclusively prohibited from performing penetrative sex. The prohibition against oral sex was at odds with British sodomy law, whose case law did not cover oral penetration. Section 377, however, in early cases tried in India mainly involved forced fellatio with unwilling male children and one unusual case of sexual intercourse with the nostril of a buffalo.

In the Singaporean context, the Court of Appeal eventually held that heterosexual fellatio was exempted if indulged in as foreplay which eventually leads to coitus: This rationale explicitly confirmed that oral or anal penetration as a substitute for vaginal-penile penetration was permitted, whereas oral stimulation - including penetration of the oral cavity - could be practised as an introduction (or even prerequisite) to heterosexual sexual penetration, and hence outside the scope of the law.

[I]t is a fact of life, in humans as well as in animals, that before the act of copulation takes place there is foreplay to stimulate the sex urge. Kissing is the most common although there are several others...

Of course, this form of contrectation [fellatio or cunnilingus] may not recommend itself to everyone for stimulating the sex urge. Even a man and a woman engaged in consensual sexual intercourse may draw the line at fellatio or cunnilingus. But the fact remains that it is practised by some. We note...that [there is] some statistical evidence...of these forms of oral sex being practised in Singapore. We cannot shut our minds to it.

[W]hen couples engaged in consensual sexual intercourse willingly indulge in fellatio and cunnilingus as a stimulant to their respective sexual urges, neither act can be considered to be against the order of nature and punishable under s 377 of the Penal Code. In every other instance the act of fellatio between a man and a woman will be carnal intercourse against the order of nature and punishable under s 377.

The Singaporean margin note of the original Section 377 further explained that mere penetration of the penis into the anus or mouth even without orgasm would constitute the offence. The law applied regardless of the act being consensual between both parties and done in private.

Section 377 was repealed in the Penal Code (Amendment) Act 2007 and replaced with a new Section 377 criminalising sex with dead bodies ("Sexual penetration of a corpse"), which was substituted in its place.

=== Section 377A ===
Section 377A was introduced into the Singapore Penal Code in 1938 to criminalise all other non-penetrative sexual acts. It is descended from the Labouchere Amendment.

In the local context, "gross indecency" is a broad term which, from a review of past cases locally, has been applied to mutual masturbation, genital contact, or even lewd behaviour without direct physical contact. As with the former Section 377, performing such acts in private does not constitute a defence. The law does not criminalise sex between females, only between males.

Any male person who, in public or private, commits, or abets the commission of, or procures or attempts to procure the commission by any male person of, any act of gross indecency with another male person, shall be punished with imprisonment for a term which may extend to 2 years.

— Outrages on decency, Section 377A, Singapore Penal Code

Its original mother statute, Section 377 (since repealed), criminalised any sexual act that went "against the order of nature":

Whoever voluntarily has carnal intercourse against the order of nature with any man, woman or animals, shall be punished with imprisonment for life, or with imprisonment for a term which may extend to 10 years, and shall also be liable to fine. Explanation. Penetration is sufficient to constitute the carnal intercourse necessary to the offence described in this section.

— Singapore Penal Code, Section 377

== Public opinion ==
The Ministry of Home Affairs (MHA) was quoted in The Straits Times of 18 September 2007 saying that public feedback on the issue had been "emotional, divided and strongly expressed", with a majority of people calling for Section 377A to be retained. The MHA also said that it recognised that "we are generally a conservative society and that we should let the situation evolve".

On 3 October 2007, an online appeal was launched via the "Repeal 377A" website to gather signatories for an open letter to the Prime Minister calling for the repeal of Section 377A. In response, a counter-petition on the website "Keep 377A" was set up to give citizens a channel to voice support for the Government's retention of the law. By 1:30 p.m. on 20 October, Keep377A had overtaken Repeal377A by 7,068 to 7,058 signatories. As online petitions, both websites suffered the same doubts regarding the credibility of the numbers of their signatories. There was no mention of whether technical measures were taken to ensure that multiple-voting by the same person was prevented.

In 2018, an Ipsos survey found that 55% of Singapore residents supported retaining Section 377A.

Shortly after the Penal Code review report was released on 9 September 2018, a movement known as Ready4Repeal launched a petition to campaign for Section 377A to be repealed, even though MHA and Ministry of Law said there were no plans to do so. The petition attracted 44,650 signatures. Ready4Repeal also held a town hall meeting on 30 September 2018, which over 800 people attended. In contrast, a petition calling for Section 377A to be kept attracted more than 109,000 signatures after it closed on 24 September 2018.

In 2022, Ipsos made another survey, noting that this figure had dropped to 44% compared to its 2018 survey, amid changing attitudes towards same-sex relationships.

== Constitutional challenges ==
Section 377A was repeatedly challenged before the courts of Singapore as being unconstitutional. All challenges were chiefly based on Article 12 of the Constitution of Singapore, which guarantees all persons equality before the law, and Article 9 of the Constitution of Singapore, which guarantees all persons the right to life and the right to personal liberty.

=== Tan Eng Hong v. Attorney-General ===
On 24 September 2010, criminal lawyer M Ravi filed an application in the High Court to challenge the constitutionality of Section 377A on behalf of his client Tan Eng Hong, who was charged for allegedly having oral sex with another consenting adult male in a locked cubicle of a public toilet.

On 19 March 2011, Tan's case was thrown out of court by High Court justice Lai Siu Chiu, citing "a lack of a real controversy" for the court to deal with. This is important, as according to the Rules of Court (Cap. 322 § 80, O 18 r. 19, 1996 Rev. Ed.), only cases which are not "frivolous" may be argued. However, on 21 August 2012, the Court of Appeal reversed Lai's decision, ruling that 377A did "affect the lives of a not insignificant portion of [Singaporeans] in a very real and intimate way" and that the case would proceed once again in the High Court.

Tan's case was finally heard on 6 March 2013, and decided against him by justice Quentin Loh on 2 October 2013. In his ruling, Loh wrote that the issue was one of "morality and societal values" and if it were to be changed, it would have to be by Singapore's Parliament. Tan appealed the ruling to the Court of Appeal, and his case was joined at his request as an intervening party with Lim Meng Suang and another v. Attorney-General (below), which was also pending before the Court of Appeal, on 11 October 2013.

=== Lim Meng Suang and another v. Attorney-General ===
After Tan's successful appeal to be heard by the court, a separate constitutional challenge was filed on 30 November 2012 on behalf of Lim Meng Suang and Kenneth Chee Mun-leon, a gay couple of fifteen years, by attorney Peter Low. The case was heard in camera on 14 February 2013, and decided against them by justice Quentin Loh on 9 April 2013, for much the same reasons as his decision against Tan (above). Lim and Chee appealed to the Court of Appeal on 30 April 2013. In July 2013, after a successful crowdfunding campaign, they hired two highly esteemed lawyers: Deborah Barker, Senior Counsel at KhattarWong LLP, and British lawyer, Debevoise & Plimpton partner and former Attorney General for England and Wales Lord Peter Henry Goldsmith. Goldsmith had agreed to take the case without pay, but that September was disallowed from arguing the case before the court by Justice V. K. Rajah, as he believed that the legal issues were arguable by domestic lawyers, which is preferred by Singapore law.

On 29 October 2014, more than four years after the original challenge by Tan, the Court of Appeal, the highest court in Singapore, rejected Lim and Chee's challenge, finally ending the case. The court held that 377A was consistent with Article 9 as it is meant to protect against unlawful imprisonment, and that it was consistent with Article 12 as it only mentions religion, race and place of birth—not gender, sexual orientation, or sex. As in all judgments before, the court held that any legal remedy would have to come about through an Act of Parliament.

Compared to news of LGBT rights in other nations such as Russia and the United States, the case and final appeal received little attention outside Singapore. The Huffington Post featured Chee and Lim's story prominently under the headline "How One of the World's Richest Countries Is Limiting Basic Human Rights" and Bloomberg also published an article on the ruling.

=== Ong Ming Johnson v. Attorney-General and other matters ===
On 29 August 2018, Professor Ho Kwon Ping in his talk questioned the need for Section 377A in Singapore. After India's Supreme Court decriminalised sex between two people of the same sex, with Professor Tommy Koh encouraging a constitutional challenge of Section 377A and chief of Singapore government communications Mr Janadas Devan hoping that Section 377A would go, several constitutional challenges have been brought to the Supreme Court.

The first challenge after India's ruling was filed on 10 September 2018 by Johnson Ong, known by stage name DJ Big Kid, and was based on Article 9 of the Constitution. The second challenge was filed by LGBT rights activist Choong Chee Hong in November 2018 and argues that Section 377A is inconsistent with Articles 9, 12 and 14 of the Constitution. A third was filed by retired general practitioner Tan Seng Kee on 20 September 2019, also based on Articles 9, 12 and 14 of the Constitution. In addition, he argued that although the Government will not enforce the law on acts done in private, the Public Prosecutor can decide whether to prosecute someone under Section 377A, which would be inconsistent with Section 14 of the Criminal Procedure Code, which requires the police to "unconditionally investigate all complaints of suspected arrestable offences".

On 30 March 2020, justice See Kee Oon consolidated the three challenges into one case and ruled against them, arguing that the law was intended to safeguard morals and prosecute all forms of indecency between men whether in public or private, and not just male prostitution when the law was made in 1938. He also stated that there's no strong scientific evidence that a person's sexual orientation is unchangeable, and once again ruled that Parliament is the proper venue for repeal. Appeals were filed on 31 March 2020.

On 28 February 2022, it was ruled by the Court of Appeal that, because the law is not enforced, the constitutional challenges against it had failed.

== Repeal of Section 377A ==
On 21 August 2022, Prime Minister Lee announced during his 2022 National Day Rally speech that Section 377A would be repealed by the government. Lee stated that "I believe this is the right thing to do and something that most Singaporeans will now accept. This will bring the law into line with current social norms and, I hope, provide some relief to gay Singaporeans." Laws to repeal 377A were introduced on 20 October, with a two-day debate that started on 28 November.

=== Parliamentary vote ===
On 29 November 2022, the Penal Code (Amendment) Bill, which repealed Section 377A, passed in Parliament following a 10-hour debate that had begun the day prior. A total of 96 MPs voted on the topic of repeal, with all 83 People's Action Party (PAP) MPs and three WP's MPs voting in favour, while two other WP's MPs, Gerald Giam and Dennis Tan, as well as nominated MP Hoon Hian Teck, voted against. All members of the ruling party PAP voted according to the party's position as the party whip was not lifted, while WP lifted its party whip.

With a vote of 85 to 2, a constitutional amendment to protect the definition of marriage from legal challenge was approved. Two Workers Party MPs, Sylvia Lim and He Ting Ru, abstained from the vote. Hazel Poa and Leong Mun Wai, both Progress Singapore Party non-constituency Members of Parliament, declared that they would oppose the proposed amendment because they think a national referendum should be held to decide what constitutes marriage.

The bill was assented by President Halimah Yacob on 27 December 2022 and gazetted on 3 January 2023, thus Section 377A was struck off the books.

=== Post-repeal plans ===
The Law and Home Affairs Minister, K Shanmugam, told Parliament in November 2022 that only a "small" number of people were convicted under the section for private consensual acts between adults from 1988 until 2007, when enforcement effectively ceased outright. The Minister stated he would direct the Ministry for Home Affairs (MHA) to consider how these records could be purged. Days after the repeal bill passed, the MHA added that the records of 17 people convicted under Section 377A during that time period could have their criminal records expunged and rendered spent.

== See also ==
- Criminal law of Singapore
- LGBT rights in Singapore
- Paragraph 175 (Germany)
- Pink Dot SG
- Sodomy law
