= Transgender people in Singapore =

The history and subculture surrounding transgender people in Singapore is substantial. As with LGBT rights in the country in general, transgender rights in Singapore have also evolved significantly over time, including various laws and public attitudes in regards to identity documents, as well as anti-discrimination measures used by or pertaining to transgender people, in the areas of employment, education, housing and social services, amongst others.

Gender-affirming surgery is legal in the country since 1973, the first country in Asia to legalise it. However, a citizen of Singapore is only able to change their legal sex after undergoing gender-affirming surgery, being physically examined by a relevant practitioner (such as an endocrinologist or plastic surgeon), and being found that genitalia has been completely changed. A change in gender marker applies to most government documents, including the NRIC and passport, only excluding the birth certificate (if the citizen was born in Singapore). In 1996, marriage was also legalised for transgender people.

== Summary ==
| Right to change legal name | Right to change legal gender | Right to access medical treatment | Right to marry | Military service |
|---|---|---|---|---|
| Yes Deed poll and statutory declaration available | Yes Since 1973 | Yes Always legal | Yes Since 1996, after an amendment was made to the Women's Charter | Yes Since the 1990s (Note: See transgender people in Singapore#National service for more details.) |

== History ==
=== National service ===
The Ministry of Defence declared in 2016 that only individuals who had been legally declared female would not be required to serve, thus limiting exemption of service only to transgender individuals who have undergone sex reassignment surgery (SRS). However due to the difficulty of transitioning early, only a very small percentage of transgender people in Singapore undergo SRS before having to enter National Service.

Since 2016, the Ministry of Defence has changed its policy, allowing individuals diagnosed with gender dysphoria – whether prior to or during the pre-enlistee medical exam – to receive exemption due to distress caused and high rate of comorbidity with several other psychiatric conditions.

=== Sex reassignment surgery ===
Sexual reassignment surgery in Singapore are only conducted by approved gynecologists, such as Shan Ratnam. Surgery on genitalia had been done prior to 1971 but only for patients who had both male and female reproductive organs.

The first sexual reassignment surgery, a male to female sex reassignment surgery, was done in July 1971 at Kandang Kerbau Hospital. The person was a 24-year-old Chinese Singaporean and had extensively cross dressed by her grandmother when young and then frequent the transgender scene in her teen years. She underwent psychological analysis by psychiatrists to be suitable for the surgery and legal approval was obtained from the Ministry of Health.

In 1974, Ratnam also headed a team of surgeon to perform the first female to male sex reassignment surgery in Singapore and probably the first in Southeast Asia, was also offered at Kandang Kerbau Hospital and at Alexandra Hospital. A Gender Identity Clinic (GIC) and Gender Reassignment Surgery Clinic were set up at the National University Hospital two decades later. It was headed by Ratnam. For 30 years, Singapore was one of the world leaders in SRS, performing more than 500 such operations.

In the late 1980s, authorities requested hospitals to stop SRS for fear of exposure of HIV to surgical teams. The request was subsequently stopped in 2001.

Since 2013, no public hospitals in Singapore offer SRS. In 2014, The Straits Times, the main local newspaper, asked Ministry of Health (MOH) on why the surgery was stopped, MOH replied that the surgery was not subsidied and done with safeguards.

In 2024, Sengkang Group Representation Constituency's MP Jamus Lim asked MOH during parliament session on why SRS was stopped in 2014 and any plans to resume SRS, MOH replied that it still offered SRS for medically necessary care and not subsidied.

=== Transitioning as a minor ===
Through the public healthcare system, permission from guardians is required for those under 21 to undergo medical transition, but hormone replacement therapy is not available for those under 18; transition through the private healthcare system traditionally adheres to different guidelines. Minors additionally face barriers in social transition, particularly in the public education system, with a lack of accommodations for issues such as bathroom choice and school uniforms.

=== Legal reforms ===
In 1973, Singapore legalised SRS. A policy was instituted to enable post-operative transgender people to change the legal gender on their National Registration Identity Card (NRIC) but not their birth certificates and other documents which flowed from that. There was no specific provision in the statutes which allowed the Registrar to do this, so it existed probably only at the level of a policy directive.

=== Transgender marriage ===
Before 1996, Singapore legally did not allow transgender marriage but it was implicitly allowed before 1991. Before 1991, the Registry of Marriages (ROM) only verify the gender of couples based on their legal gender recorded on the NRIC which can be changed after a successful SRS.

In 1990, a woman successfully petitioned for and received an annulment from the High Court after discovering that her husband was transgender. In response, ROM began requiring couples to produce their birth certificates (of which gender markers are inalterable) during declaration of their intent of marriage.

This requirement to produce birth certificates before marriage was overturned when, in 1996, a bill was presented by Senior Minister for State for Community Development Ch'ng Jit Koon before the Parliament of Singapore to amend the Women's Charter with recognition of marriages involving transgender individuals among various changes. Minister for Community Development Abdullah Tarmugi said that the 1991 High Court ruling (Lim Ying v Hiok Kian Ming Eric) was taken into consideration for the amendment during a press conference. If the amendment was adopted, the person who had undergone a sex change procedure would be deemed a person of the new gender and allowed to marry as the new gender. On 24 January, Minister for Community Development Abdullah Tarmugi announced that post-operative transgender people are allowed to marry opposite-sex spouses.

== See also ==
- Singapore gay terminology
- LGBT rights in Singapore
- List of transgender-related topics
