= Pink Dot SG =

Annual LGBTQ event in Singapore

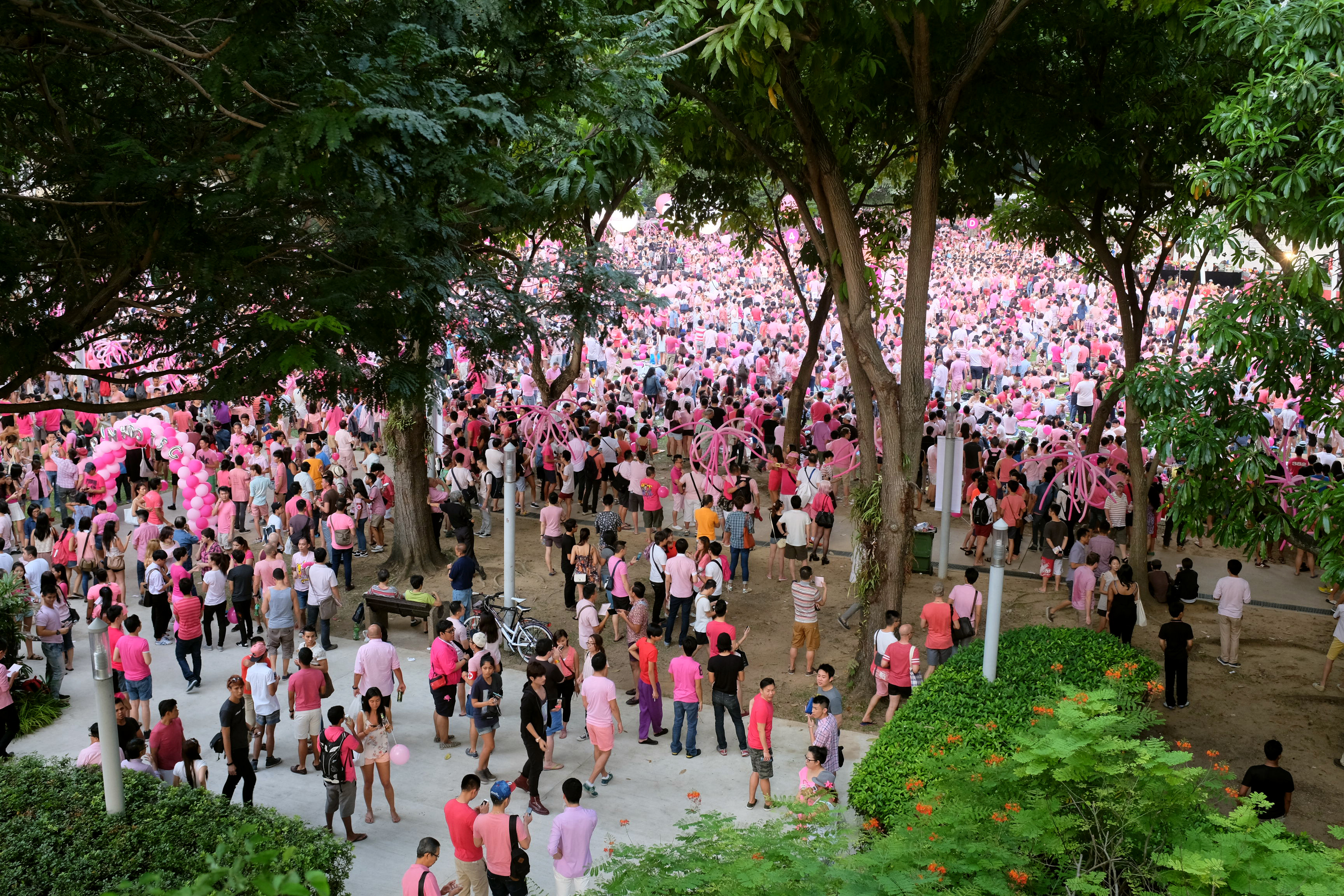
- The LGBTQ community converging at Hong Lim Park in Singapore for Pink Dot SG in 2014
- Status: Active
- Genre: LGBTQ
- Dates: 16 May 2009; 15 May 2010; 18 June 2011; 30 June 2012; 29 June 2013; 28 June 2014; 13 June 2015; 4 June 2016; 1 July 2017; 21 July 2018; 29 June 2019; 27 June 2020; 12 June 2021; 18 June 2022; 24 June 2023; 29 June 2024; 28 June 2025; 27 June 2026; 26 June 2027
- Frequency: Annual
- Venue: Speakers' Corner, Singapore
- Locations: Hong Lim Park, Singapore
- Coordinates: 1°17′11.73″N 103°50′47.02″E
- Country: Singapore
- Years active: 17
- Inaugurated: 16 May 2009
- Most recent: 27 June 2026
- Next event: 26 June 2027
- Attendance: 20,000–30,000
- Major events: Support for the LGBTQ community in Singapore
- Organiser: Pink Dot SG
- Website: pinkdot.sg

Pink Dot SG, known endonymously as Pink Dot, is a pride event that has occurred annually since 2009 in support of the LGBTQ community in Singapore. Attendees of Pink Dot events gather to form a "pink dot" to show support for inclusiveness, diversity and the freedom to love in the country. Pink Dot events typically include concert performances and booths sponsored by organizations that support the LGBTQ community and cause in addition to the event's name-brand formation.

The success of Pink Dot in Singapore has inspired similar events in several other countries, leading to the event to become known as Pink Dot SG — SG being an initialism for Singapore. It has been held each year in Singapore from 2009 to 2019 at the Speakers' Corner in Hong Lim Park on a Saturday in the months of May, June or July. The 2020 and 2021 editions were held as online livestreams, in view of the global COVID-19 pandemic. The 2022 edition and subsequent editions were held in-person once again.

== History ==
In September 2008, the rules governing activities conducted at Singapore's Speakers' Corner at Hong Lim Park were relaxed, allowing demonstrations organised by Singaporeans to be held at the park, providing that all participants are either citizens or permanent residents. This allowed the first Pink Dot SG event to take place at the Speakers' Corner on 16 May 2009.

A total of seventeen Pink Dot events have been held in Singapore, occurring annually on Saturdays in May, June or July. Many organisations around the world modeled LGBTQ events after the Pink Dot concept, often borrowing the "Pink Dot" prefix. For distinction, the Singapore events became known as Pink Dot SG.

The design of the Pink Dot SG mascot "Pinkie", a personification of the pink dot, was provided by graphic designer Soh Ee Shaun.

== Events ==
Each event from 2009 to 2019 took place on a Saturday at Speakers' Corner in Hong Lim Park with the exception of the 2020 and 2021 editions where it was held online due to the global COVID-19 pandemic. Since 2022, events were held in-person once again.

=== Pink Dot SG 2009 ===
Pink Dot SG 2009 was held on 16 May, launched with a campaign video titled "RED + WHITE = PINK". It was Singapore's first public, open-air, pro-LGBTQ event and established the record at the time for the greatest turnout for a gathering at Speakers' Corner in Hong Lim Park since the venue's inception. The event was deemed a milestone for Singapore's LGBTQ community.

Ambassadors of the event were local celebrities: actor Timothy Nga, actress Neo Swee Lin and radio DJ Rosalyn Lee. During the event, formations of the words "LOVE" and "4All" were created by participants. The event concluded with the formation of the titular Pink Dot.

The pioneer Pink Dot SG event was given extensive coverage in both international and local media. Locally, The Straits Times and TODAY newspapers covered the event. However, reports regarding the number of attendees were inconsistent. Organisers estimated an attendance of 2,500, while The Straits Times reported a turnout of 1,000, and TODAY reported "at least 500". Internationally, the event was covered by the BBC and the New York Times, with reports syndicated to publications around the world through wire services the Associated Press and Agence France-Presse.

=== Pink Dot SG 2010 ===
Pink Dot SG 2010 was held on 15 May, with the theme: "Focusing on Our Families". There was a turnout of 4,000 participants and the event received local media coverage by Channel News Asia and The Sunday Times. The event was also reported internationally by the BBC, the Associated Press, Reuters and Agence France-Presse.

Ambassadors of the event were local celebrities: actor Adrian Pang, actress Tan Kheng Hua and DJ Bigkid.

=== Pink Dot SG 2011 ===
External videos
- Campaign video for Pink Dot 2011, Youtube video

Pink Dot SG 2011 was held on 18 June with more than 10,000 participants. The event featured the theme song "I Want To Hold Your Hand" by the Beatles and a campaign video by Boo Junfeng.

The event had attracted Google as a corporate sponsor, and the multinational company continued to support the event in subsequent years. Local musical cabaret trio the Dim Sum Dollies made an appearance as the official ambassadors of the event.

Pink Dot SG 2011 was covered widely by local and international mainstream media. An aerial shot of Pink Dot SG was featured on xinmsn news for June's "2011 Year in Pictures". This was also the first time Pink Dot SG was featured in "Time Out Singapore" with a full article devoted to it. The event was also promoted in an article on CNNGo.

International Pink Dot events were held the same day in Anchorage, Alaska; Kaohsiung, Taiwan; and London, England.

=== Pink Dot SG 2012 ===
External videos
- Someday, campaign video for Pink Dot 2012, Youtube video

Pink Dot SG 2012 was held on 30 June and had the campaign theme "Someday" and the theme song "True Colors". At this event, 15,000 participants formed a glowing pink dot with mobile phones, torches and flashlights.

The event added Barclays as an official corporate supporter, alongside Google. Celebrity ambassadors were former actress Sharon Au, actor Lim Yu-Beng and drag queen actor-comedian Kumar.

Pink Dot SG 2012 was widely reported in the mainstream media and by international media agencies, including The Wall Street Journal, Taiwan's lihpao, Thailand's PBS, and Egypt's bikyamasr. Singer Jason Mraz, who was giving a performance on 29 June in Singapore, made a shout-out in a video in support of Pink Dot 2012, prior to the event.

The 2012 event inspired the launch of Pink Dot Okinawa, which had its first event the following year.

=== Pink Dot SG 2013 ===
External videos
- Music video for "Home", performed by Dick Lee, for Pink Dot 2013, Youtube video

Pink Dot 2013 was held the evening of 29 June. The event marked its fifth year under a campaign of "Home", the title of a local National Day song which doubled as the event's theme song. The campaign featured a video, directed by local filmmaker Boo Junfeng, depicting three individual true-life experiences. Like the previous year, the event included the formation of the Pink Dot with pink lights.

Pink Dot organisers claimed a record turnout of 21,000, which would make it the largest civil society gathering in the country. To accommodate the large number of participants, a second "satellite" focal point was created to channel traffic away from the busiest areas. There was a provision of activities and offerings hosted by more than 20 community groups and partners such as Oogachaga.

Pink Dot SG 2013's list of corporate contributors grew to include global financial firm JPMorgan Chase, local hotel Parkroyal on Pickering, contact lens specialist CooperVision and audio branding agency The Gunnery, in addition to Google and Barclays. Local actress Michelle Chia, theatre company W!LD RICE, artistic director Ivan Heng and sportscaster Mark Richmond were the event's ambassadors.

The event was covered by local and international media, including Indonesia-based Asia Calling, The Economist, the BBC, The Guardian and Reuters. The event was also featured in the YouTube-sponsored video "Proud to Love", a compilation of video clips supporting the LGBTQ community, equal rights and marriage equality. Additionally, before the event, the band Fun made a shout-out in a video in support of Pink Dot 2013.

=== Pink Dot SG 2014 ===
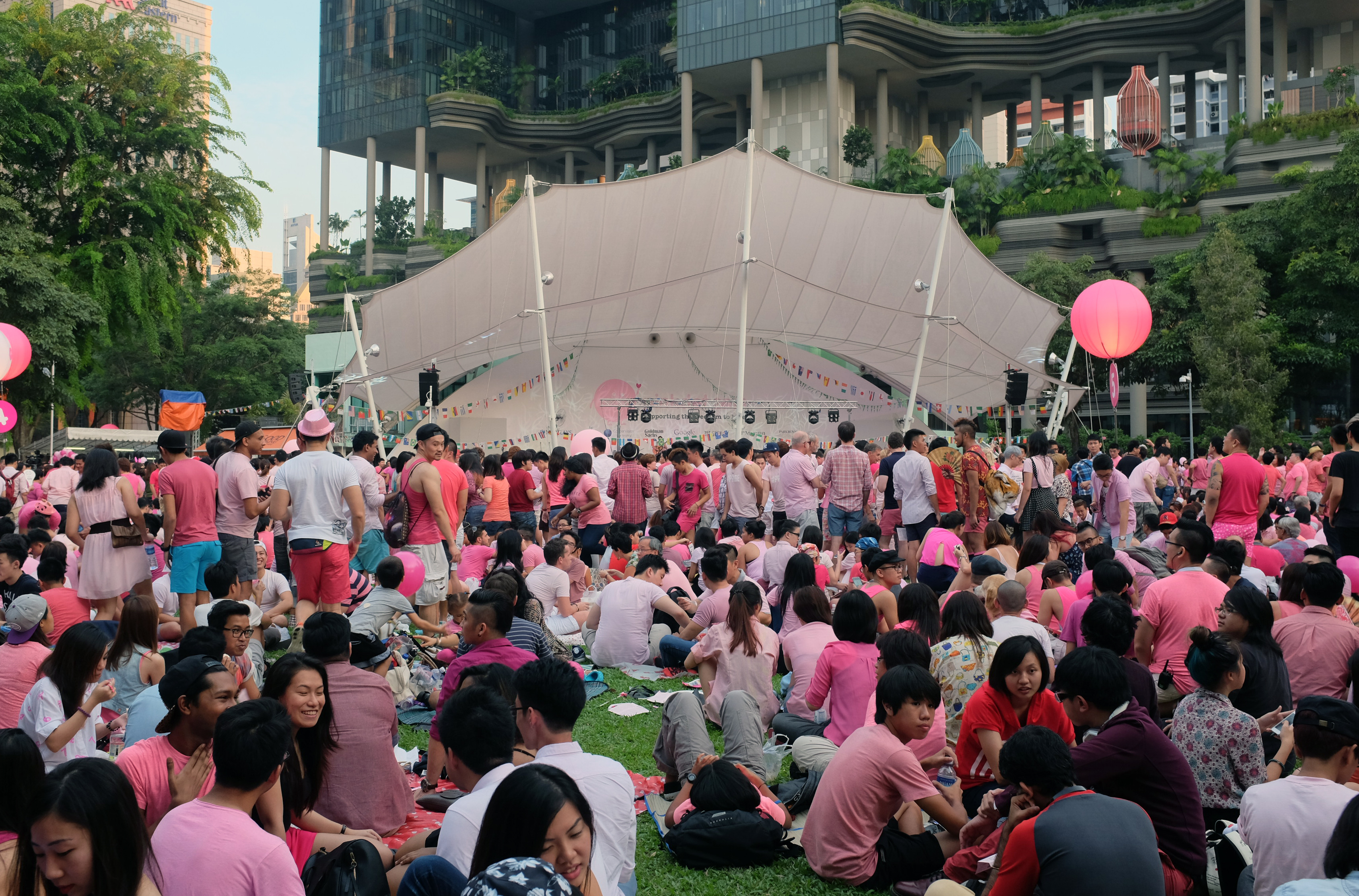
Participants of Pink Dot SG during the 2014 event

External videos
- BBC report on pushback against Pink Dot by religious groups and the "Wear White" movement, Youtube video

Pink Dot SG 2014 was held the evening of 28 June with a turnout of 26,000. The event's theme, "For Family, For Friends, For Love", highlighted the LGBTQ community's contributions to society, and its theme song was "We Are Family". In addition to the traditional Pink Dot formation with torches, 2014's event included a blue heart formation within the Pink Dot. Pink Dot SG 2014 also featured a "Community Voices" segment, in which local LGBTQ individuals and straight allies were invited to speak and share their stories.

Ambassadors of the event included Broadway performer Sebastian Tan, actor Brendon Fernandez and Nominated Member of Parliament Janice Koh. Taiwan-based Singaporean Pop Idol Stefanie Sun also supported the event through a 20-second video. Local YouTube stars Tree Potatoes made a shout-out in a video. Pink Dot SG 2014 saw energy company giant BP and multinational banking firm Goldman Sachs join a growing list of corporate sponsors.

Pink Dot SG 2014 in particular drew strong criticism from Singapore's religious Muslim and Christian communities which counter-demonstrated in a "Wear White" event, in which participants dressed in white apparel. In response, and foreseeing possible unruly behaviour, Pink Dot organisers deployed security personnel and collaborated with the Singapore Police Force (SPF) for the first time; the event nevertheless proceeded without incident. Local media covered the controversy with full-page articles and the event itself was widely reported by foreign media.

=== Pink Dot SG 2015 ===
Pink Dot SG 2015 was held the evening of 13 June. The date was chosen to prevent a clash with the Islamic month of Ramadan. The event ran under the campaign title "Where Love Lives" and included a campaign video directed by local filmmaker Boo Junfeng. The event coincided with the launch of a pioneering LGBTQ support network for local universities.

The celebrity ambassadors for Pink Dot SG 2015 included local actor Patricia Mok, Campus SuperStar winner Daren Tan and local YouTube celebrities Munah Bagharib and Hirzi Zulkiflie. However, Munah did not appear at the event, for unknown reasons. Veteran actor Patricia Mok said she wanted the local older population to support the LGBTQ community.

The list of corporate sponsors grew to include three new companies – social network Twitter, movie exhibitor Cathay Organisation and financial news company Bloomberg – in addition to Google, JP Morgan, Barclay, Goldman Sachs and The Gunnery. However, PARKROYAL hotel on Pickering, which had sponsored previous events, discontinued its sponsorship, deciding to "[channel] resources to support other equally meaningful causes". Contact Lens specialist CooperVision also did not continue its support.

Pink Dot SG 2015 drew increased focus from both anti-LGBTQ and pro-LGBTQ groups. Both sides received wide coverage on local mainstream media. The event was attended by 28,000 people, a record.

=== Pink Dot SG 2016 ===
Pink Dot SG 2016 was held on 4 June at 3 pm. Organisers did not provide an estimate of crowd size, but said the number of participants exceeded the capacity of the park. The event's ambassadors were TV host Anita Kapoor, local hip-hop artist Shigga Shay, and getai singer Liu Lingling. The event had 18 corporate sponsors, adding major sponsors Apple, Microsoft, and Facebook.

=== Pink Dot SG 2017 ===
Pink Dot SG 2017 was held on 1 July. Ambassadors included singer Nathan Hartono, paralympian swimmer Theresa Goh and actor Ebi Shankara.

Since 2017, Singapore's Ministry of Home Affairs has banned foreign residents and entities from organising and participating in the event, stating that LGBTQ discourse in the country are to be restricted to its own citizens and permanent residents. In their view, it is said that this is to prevent foreign interference as well as to better gauge LGBTQ acceptance amongst its people.

Only Singaporean citizens and permanent residents were thereby permitted to attend the rally; the identity card of each participant was verified at police checkpoints as they entered the barricaded park. Organisers said that 20,000 Singaporeans and residents attended the event, a drop from 25,000 and above in previous years – likely due to the ban on foreigners.

In addition, foreign companies such as Airbnb, Apple Inc., Facebook, Goldman Sachs, Google, Microsoft, NBCUniversal, Salesforce.com, Twitter and Uber were not permitted to directly sponsor the event. Despite the new regulations, 120 Singaporean companies donated to the event, making up for the loss of contributions from the multinationals.

=== Pink Dot SG 2018 ===
Pink Dot SG 2018 (aka Pink Dot 10) was held on 21 July, celebrating its tenth edition with the message We Are Ready. Performers for the event included local singers Tabitha Nauser and Sezairi Sezali.

As part of the commemoration of this milestone, the first edition of Pink Fest was organised with several events across the few weekends leading up to Pink Dot.

=== Pink Dot SG 2019 ===
In 2019, during the 11th Pink Dot, Lee Hsien Yang, the brother of the Prime Minister of Singapore Lee Hsien Loong, his wife and second son Li Huanwu as well as Li's husband Heng Yirui attended the event.

=== Pink Dot SG 2020 ===
The 12th Pink Dot in 2020, supposed to be held on 27 June, was cancelled in view of the coronavirus pandemic, the first time it did so. In its place was a livestreaming session where people can tune in, with the theme Love Lives Here. Despite petitions by religious groups on Change.org calling for restrictions on this livestreaming event, Singapore's Ministry of Social and Family Development ruled that the event did not contravene any laws or regulations.

Performances involved local artistes like Joanna Dong and Charlie Lim. Instead of the usual massive light display at the end, a digital map of Singapore was unveiled displaying pink lights across the island, all representing messages of support sent in by members of the public.

=== Pink Dot SG 2021 ===
The 13th Pink Dot in 2021 was held on 12 June, again as a livestream due to ongoing COVID-19 restrictions. The event was hosted by Pam Oei and Harris Zaidi. Interviewees included pageant queen and LGBTQ activist Andrea Razali, and lawyer Remy Choo, one of the lawyers involved in the legal challenges to strike down Section 377A. Performers and artistes included Joshua Simon, Charlie Lim, and TheNeoKELELims (which consists of Neo Swee Lin and Lim Kay Siu). Like the previous year, members of the public could contribute with messages of support to a virtual light display that was unveiled at the end of the event.

=== Pink Dot SG 2022 ===
The 14th Pink Dot in 2022 was initially planned to be held over two days on 18 and 19 June, but the organisers ultimately decided to host it as a single day on just 18 June, marking its return as a physical event since the start of the global COVID-19 pandemic. Being a large scale event held during a pandemic, additional safety measures such as providing proof of vaccination and scanning the contact-tracing SafeEntry code were in place.

Unlike previous physical events, the pink dot formation involved white umbrellas and pink placards, and participants could write messages on these placards. A webpage was also set up for people to upload pink light-up pictures in support. Notable attendees include Member of Parliament (MP) Henry Kwek, which according to organisers, was the first time an MP from the governing People's Action Party (PAP) attended a Pink Dot event. MP Jamus Lim of the largest opposition Workers' Party (WP) was also present at the event.

Held from 3pm to 7pm, Pink Dot SG 2022 featured a concert with local acts, including singer Preeti Nair, dance group Limited Edition, and drag performance group Singapore Drag Royalty.

=== Pink Dot SG 2023 ===
The 15th Pink Dot was held on 24 June 2023, and was the first edition since Section 377A was repealed.

Politicians spotted attending the event included PAP's Eric Chua and Derrick Goh; WP's Louis Chua and He Ting Ru; and PSP's Hazel Poa along with several members.

Reverting to the traditional mass light formation of the pink dot, volunteers and attendees assembled to form a light display featuring the word "Family" at around 8.40pm. This theme reflected the shift in advocacy post-377A, championing the inclusion and support of families that do not fit the traditional mould.

=== Pink Dot SG 2024 ===
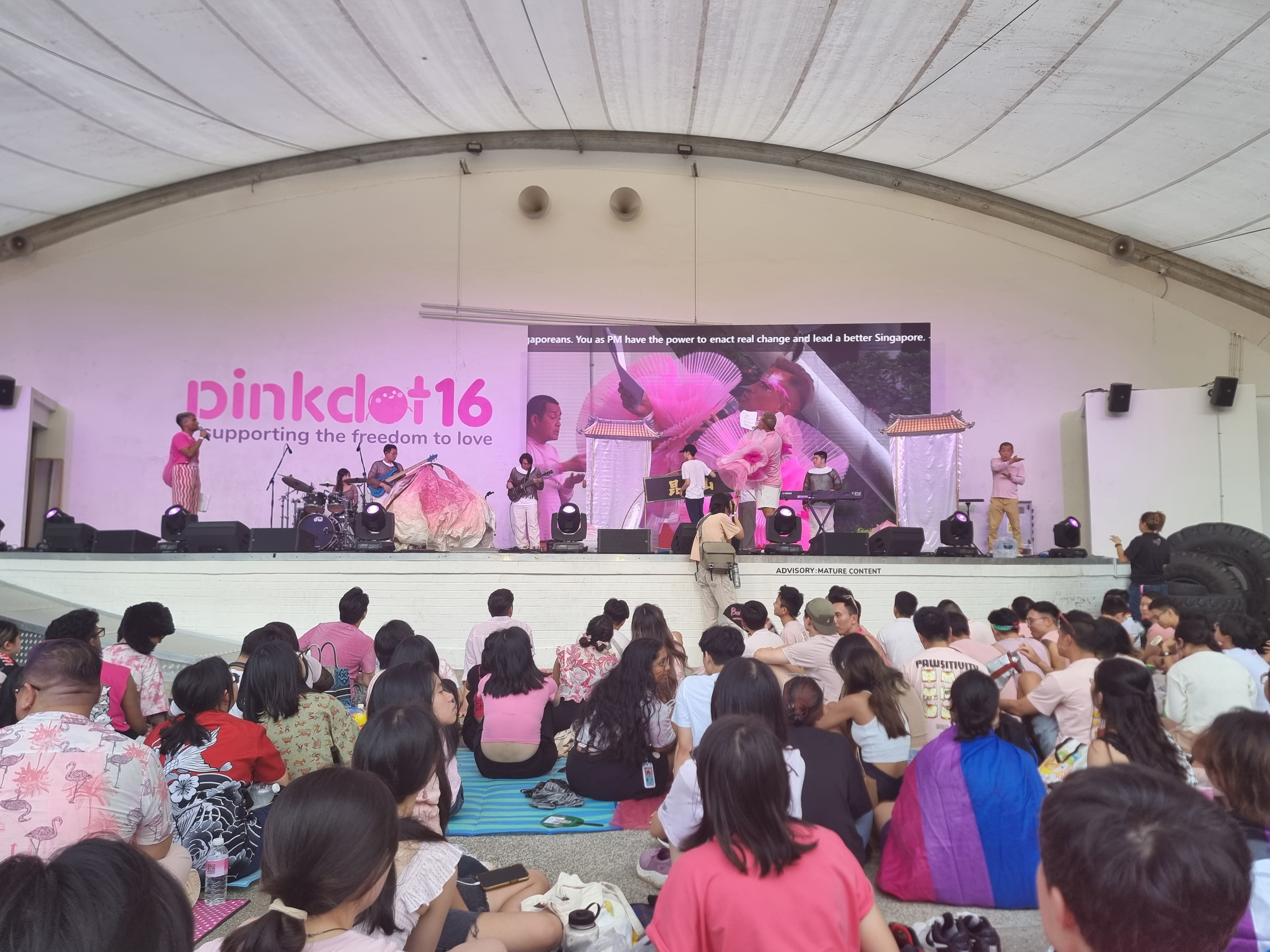
Stage for the event

The 16th Pink Dot was held 29 June 2024. Attendees were encouraged to pen messages to newly sworn in Prime Minister Lawrence Wong.

Politicians spotted attending the event included PAP's Eric Chua, Darryl David, Carrie Tan, and Derrick Goh; WP's Jamus Lim, Louis Chua, and He Ting Ru; and PSP's Jeffrey Khoo and Lim Cher Hong.

The pink dot light formation for the finale featured the word "Equality".

=== Pink Dot SG 2025 ===
The 17th Pink Dot was held on 28 June 2025, with the theme "Different Stories, Same Love".

Politicians spotted attending the event included PAP's Alex Yeo and Ng Shi Xuan; WP's Louis Chua and He Ting Ru; and PSP's Samuel Lim.

A community time capsule was sealed, to be reopened in 2050.

=== Pink Dot SG 2026 ===
The 18th Pink Dot was held on 27 June 2026, with the theme "Come get personal", encouraging people to listen to each others' stories and meet new people.

Politicians spotted attending the event included PAP's Darryl David; and WP's Jamus Lim, Louis Chua, and He Ting Ru.

The event consisted of more small-scale performances and talks instead of large-scale performances compared to previous years.

== International events ==
Many LGBTQ organisations and individuals around the world were inspired by the event in Singapore to organise their own Pink Dot events. Three were held on the same day as Pink Dot SG 2011, and many others followed the success of this event. Pink Dot events have been organised in places such as Hong Kong, Montreal, Toronto, New York, Okinawa, Utah, Anchorage, London, Penang and Taiwan. Common to all events was the gathering of participants in a Pink Dot formation.

=== Pink Dot Anchorage ===
As an Alaska PrideFest event, Pink Dot Anchorage organised a gathering on 18 June 2011 at the Anchorage Town Square. Approximately 100 participants attended and created a heart-shaped formation.

=== Pink Dot Montreal ===
Pink Dot events were held at Place Émilie-Gamelin in Montreal, Quebec, Canada from 2012 to 2014. The movement sought to promote trust and honesty between LGBTQ individuals and their friends and families, so that they could coming out of the closet and bring change through open conversations.

The first event on 18 August 2012, attracted nearly 300 participants. Prior to the event, a competition was held in which LGBTQ individuals were invited to submit their personal coming-out stories. The top three writers were sent an invitation to the event, and their stories were read in front of other participants.

On 17 August 2013, a second Pink Dot MTL event was held. The event had a one-page feature in the local gay magazine Fugues.

On 16 August 2014, a nighttime Pink Dot event was held. It began at 11 pm and featured glowsticks.

=== Pink Dot New York ===
Pink Dot picnics were held on 7 June 2011, 6 October 2012 and 22 June 2013 in Central Park, New York City. Approximately 30 participants turned up for each event. Pink Dot NY did not continue in subsequent years.

=== Pink Dot Okinawa ===
==== 2013 ====
Pink Dot Okinawa was inspired by Singapore's Pink Dot. Pink Dot OK 2013 was the island's first LGBTQ event and was held on 14 July with a turnout of 800 people. The event was held in a park in Naha city, Okinawa, Japan due to its large tourist crowd and diverse culture.

Pink Dot OK 2013 featured pre-night club events, a pre-event beach party, an LGBTQ book fair and an after-party. The event was covered by local media, including the Okinawa Times and Ryukyu Shimpo. The mascot for the event was Pinkmaaru, a winking cartoon animal with the event's name, "Pink Dot OK".

==== 2014, 2015 and 2016 ====
Pink Dot OK 2014 was held on 20 June in Naha city with an estimated turnout of 12,000. Star Trek actor George Takei made a shout-out to the event.

Pink Dot OK 2015 was held on 19 July at Tembusu Square on Kokusai street in Naha city.

Pink Dot OK 2016 was held on 17 July in Naha city.

=== Pink Dot Penang ===
Pink Dot Penang was launched in 2011 in Penang and was well received in the local LGBTQ community. A group called "Penang Freedom to Love" was formed after the event to continue spreading the idea of "love has no boundaries".

A 2014 Pink Dot event was planned to be held on 29 March at the 1926 Heritage Hotel in Penang, Malaysia by Penang Freedom to Love, SUARAM and other local groups. With the slogan "Sit in solidarity in the day, Dance together in the night", Pink Dot Penang was meant to be a two-part event, including a workshop during the day and a party at night. The event was cancelled on 16 March, however, due to religious pressure from Malaysia's Perkasa and other Muslim activists, who made police reports claiming the event was a "sex festival".

No Pink Dot events in Penang has been held ever since.

=== Pink Dot Toronto ===
On 21 May 2016, ACAS (Asian Community AIDS Services) and the Chinese Canadian National Council's Toronto Chapter organised Pink Dot TO in Toronto, Ontario at Market 707 in support of LGBTQ Asians in Canada. The event featured speeches, a march and performances.

=== Pink Dot Kaohsiung ===
==== 2011 ====
A Pink Dot gathering was organised by the Taiwan Adolescent Association on Sexualities on 18 June 2011 in Kaohsiung, Taiwan. Participants gathered at the Kaohsiung Cultural Center.

==== 2015 ====
Pink Dot TW 2015 was held on 16, 17 and 30 May at Kaohsiung Aozihdi Park, National Cheng Kung University, and HuaShan Grand Green, respectively. Originally planned to be held on 20 May, the HuaShan event was postponed due to bad weather. The event's slogan was "Let's get closer, let the picnic be pinker", with a campaign video of the same title.

=== Pink Dot Utah ===
Pink Dot Utah is a campaign inspired by the Singapore event with the theme "Support, Love, Courage". It aimed to engender an appreciation of Utah's diversity, including diversity of race, language, religion, sexual orientation, and gender identity or gender expression. The campaign encouraged individuals in the LGBTQ community to share their life stories, which are then featured on the campaign website. Pink Dot Utah was organised by the Support Love Courage Council.

==== 2011 ====
Pink Dot Utah 2011 was held on National Coming Out Day, 11 October, at the Spring Mobile Ball Park in Salt Lake City, Utah. More than 3,000 participants attended. Several community organisations and businesses were in attendance, including representatives from First Baptist Church and Utah's Latino community. Organisers invited Emmy award-winning composer Kurt Bestor and co-host of Fox News's Live at Five and News at Nine Newscasts Hope Woodside as celebrity ambassadors. The event was covered by local newspaper The Salt Lake Tribune.

==== 2012 ====
A second Pink Dot Utah event was held on 22 September 2012 in Jordan Park, Salt Lake City, Utah. The event announced winners of a "Pinkdot Baby Contest", in which parents submitted photos of their babies with a "pink" theme. The event featured performances by celebrities and speeches by various speakers. The event was supported by Mormons Building Bridges, a group that encourages heterosexual members of the Church of Jesus Christ of Latter-day Saints to offer love and support to their LGBTQ brothers and sisters. The event was mentioned on the LGBTQ blog JoeMyGod.com.

Another Pink Dot event, Pink Dot St. George, was held in Utah on 3 November 2012 in Vernon Worthen Park, Saint George, Utah, featuring speeches by three speakers. The programme received local media coverage by Dixie Sun News.

== Reception ==
=== Counter-campaigns by religious groups ===
In 2014, Pink Dot SG drew strong opposition from some Muslim and Christian religious groups in Singapore. One response to the event was FamFest, or the Red Dot Family Movement, which was organised by LoveSingapore, a network of Singaporean churches. FamFest was initially planned to be held on the same day as Pink Dot 2014 at the Padang. However, the event was cancelled after its application was rejected by the Ministry of Social and Family Development, which deemed the location unsuitable. FamFest continued as a virtual rally on Facebook.

In response to the appearance of a Muslim woman in the Pink Dot SG 2014 campaign video, Islamic religious teacher Ustaz Noor Deros called for a Wear White campaign in defence of traditional Islamic values. Notably, an evening prayer marking the fasting month coincided with the Pink Dot SG 2014 event. Faith Community Baptist Church (FCBC) and the LoveSingapore network of churches also called on their members to join local Muslims in the campaign to dress in white, and worshipers at the mosque and the two churches were seen wearing white in the days following the event.{{

In light of possible unrest by these religious groups, security personnel of the Singapore Police Force (SPF) were deployed at Pink Dot SG 2014 for crowd management and protection purposes. The event managed to proceed without interference, with Wear White campaign organisers telling supporters to keep at a distance from the Pink Dot gathering and the FCBC announcing that its members did not intend to picket the event.

=== Other religious groups and Pink Dot 2014 ===
Leading up to Pink Dot SG 2014, and in response to other reactions about the event, other religious groups in Singapore made statements about their stands on LGBTQ issues.

On behalf of the Muslim community, the Islamic Religious Council of Singapore (MUIS) advised Muslims not to be confrontational towards the LGBTQ community. The MUIS indicated that it does not approve of the "pervasiveness" of the LGBTQ lifestyle, but cautioned against mosques being involved in the Pink Dot or Wear White initiatives. Minister-in-charge of Muslim Affairs Yaacob Ibrahim issued a statement saying that Singaporeans who wanted to express support for a cause or lifestyle choice should express it in a way that does not divide the community. He emphasized tolerance and the need "to keep the social fabric as tight as possible".

The National Council of Churches of Singapore (NCCS) stated: The council also wishes to state that while it does not condone homosexual or bi-sexual practices, it also does not condemn those who are struggling with their gender identity and sexual orientation.

On behalf of the Catholic Church, Archbishop William Goh stated:

This kind of lifestyle should not be promoted by Catholics as it is detrimental to society, is not helpful to integral human development and contrary to Christian values. Thus, whilst the Church urges compassion, acceptance, patient understanding and mutual respect for these individuals, she believes that there are ways to ensure justice and the protection of their dignity without the risk of endangering the future of the marriage institution, family and society.

Goh later released a second statement apologising for any insensitivity in his previous statement and added that while the Church does not disapprove of non-sexual same-sex relationships, it is Catholic teaching that marriage is between a man and a woman and that sex before marriage is not allowed.

=== Corporate sponsorship ===
Up until 2017, the Pink Dot SG events featured a growing number of corporate sponsors each year. The involvement of corporations in the local LGBTQ scene drew criticism from various socially conservative groups.

In 2015, furniture retailer IKEA, upon receiving feedback from pro-LGBTQ groups, announced a review of its support for a magic show staged by a pastor known for his views against homosexuality. The pastor was also responsible for previous anti-Pink Dot movements, while IKEA is known globally to be a supporter of the LGBTQ community. However, after the review, IKEA Singapore decided to continue support for the magic show. This decision has drawn criticism from pro-LGBTQ groups, including the organisers of Pink Dot, and support from socially conservative organisations.

=== 2016 online threat ===
In 2016, a Christian member of the Facebook group "We Are Against Pinkdot in Singapore" threatened to "open fire" on the community. The post was widely shared on social media and attracted much attention. The individual later apologised and claimed his post was taken out of context and was meant to be figurative.

The Singaporean police investigated the individual, and the person later plead guilty to a lessened charge after a plea bargain of "making a threatening, abusive or insulting communication under the Protection from Harassment Act (POHA)", and was fined SGD$3,500 and given a conditional warning. If convicted of the original charge, making an electronic record containing an incitement to violence, they could have been sentenced to up to five years in jail.

=== Pam Oei's Faghag Play ===
Pam Oei's one-woman cabaret show Faghag, staged by Wild Rice and directed by Ivan Heng, was part of Pink Dot SG's Pink Fest program, and it "serves as a crash course on the history of LGBTQ activism in Singapore in the 2000s".

Faghag became embroiled in controversy in 2021 when an LGBTQ community group, The Bi+ Collective, called out Pam Oei for "reclaiming a slur that was not a term for cis straight women to reclaim" and for riding on rainbow capitalism. This led to fierce responses from Pam Oei's supporters such as Alfian Sa'at and Ivan Heng, resulting in a heated debate on social media.

== Impact ==
=== Human rights recognition ===
Pink Dot SG was deemed significant enough to be included in the US Department of State's Human Rights Reports for 2009, released on 11 March 2010:

On May 16, a rally in support of "the freedom of lesbian, gay, bisexual, and transgender persons in Singapore to love" took place at Speakers Corner. Participants held pink umbrellas aloft and arranged themselves to form a large pink dot when seen from nearby high‐rise buildings. The rally took place without disturbance.

Pink Dot SG was also featured in the 2011 documentary film Courage Unfolds, by the International Gay and Lesbian Human Rights Commission and the Lesbian Activism Project of the Philippines. The documentary film highlights the issues faced by LGBTQ people in Asia.

=== Google's LGBTQ campaign ===
Google was notably the first major Pink Dot corporate sponsor and supported the event beginning in 2011. Google Singapore also launched a "Legalize Love" 2012 campaign seeking to promote a supportive culture for LGBTQ people in and outside the workplace. In Google Maps, Google presented a 360-degree panorama of Hong Lim Park featuring Pink Dot 2013 during both the day and night.

=== Section 377A of the Penal Code of Singapore ===
In 2012, Tan Eng Hong brought a court challenge of the constitutionality of section 377A of the Penal Code of Singapore, a law dating back to the British colonial era which de jure criminalises, albeit de facto unenforced, sex between mutually consenting men. It is legal among women. The challenge garnered much public debate and, in response, Pink Dot SG made the following statement in 2013:

WE RECOGNISE that the matter has been taken to the court, and we should let the law take its course. We understand the need to respect the sanctity of the Judiciary, and not undertake acts seen to pressure it, or prejudice a case that stands before it. WE ACKNOWLEDGE that a society as pluralistic and diverse as ours will have a multitude of viewpoints, which all of us have to respect and cherish, as it is this spectrum of opinions, beliefs and ideas that make Singapore strong, not the differences that seek to divide us from being truly, one united people.

==== Repeal ====
In February 2022, the Court of Appeal of the Supreme Court of Singapore reaffirmed that 377A cannot be used to prosecute men for having gay sex, and that it is "unenforcable in its entirety". In August 2022, Prime Minister Lee Hsien Loong announced that Section 377A would be repealed by the government, ending criminalisation both de facto and de jure.

In response to the repeal announcement, Pink Dot SG and various other LGBTQ community groups in Singapore released a community statement, praising the repeal as a "significant milestone and a powerful statement that state-sanctioned discrimination has no place in Singapore", and also acknowledging the repeal as "the first step on a long road towards full equality for LGBTQ+ people in Singapore". The bill was assented by President Halimah Yacob on 27 December 2022 and gazetted on 3 January 2023, thus officially repealing Section 377A, 16 years after it became de jure unenforced.

== See also ==
- LGBTQ pride events in Singapore
- LGBTQ rights in Singapore
- List of LGBTQ organisations in Singapore
- List of LGBTQ rights organisations
