= Alex Au =

Singaporean LGBT rights advocate

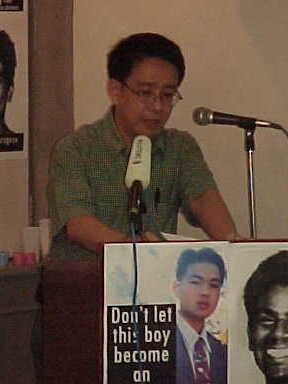
- Au in 2005
- Born: 1952 (age 73–74); Singapore
- Other name: Yawning Bread
- Education: Anglo-Chinese School; National University of Singapore
- Website: www.yawningbread.org (defunct)

Alex Au Waipang, (simplified Chinese: 区伟鹏; traditional Chinese: 區偉鵬; pinyin: Ōu Wěi Péng) also known by his Internet pseudonym as Yawning Bread, is an advocate of LGBT rights in Singapore. Au is a blogger and activist who provides analyses of Singaporean politics, culture, gay issues and miscellaneous subjects on his blog. He is also the co-author of two books, People Like Us: Sexual Minorities in Singapore and a French-language treatise on homophobia entitled L'Homophobie.

He was the owner of Rairua, Singapore's first nude gay sauna.

== Biography ==
Au, of Cantonese descent, was born in Singapore in 1952. He attended the Anglo-Chinese School for his primary and secondary education and obtained his tertiary degree from the National University of Singapore. After graduation, he worked in a managerial position at a British multinational corporation before branching out on his own as the proprietor of several business catering to the gay community, as well as freelance writing. He was one of the founding members, along with Joseph Lo and Dr. Russell Heng, of Singapore's main gay equality lobby group People Like Us, and also the founder and list owner of the Singapore Gay News List (SiGNeL), the first discussion forum for Singapore's gay community. In 2002, he was presented with the Utopia award for outstanding contributions towards the advancement of gay equality in Asia.

In July 2003, Au was identified by the now-defunct Channel i as a gay activist. His views were solicited in the wake of Prime Minister Goh Chok Tong's recent announcement that the hiring of gays in the civil service would henceforth be liberalized. In the run-up to the 2006 Singapore general election, Au provided extensive coverage of the opposition parties' rallies which were attended by large crowds. Au used his connections with People Like Us and with leading practitioners in the local gay arts scene to organize IndigNation, Singapore's first gay pride month in 2005 and Short Circuit, Singapore's first gay film festival in 2006.

In July 2012, the attorney general's chambers wrote to Au, demanding that he take down and apologize for a June 2012 post in his Yawning Bread blog that criticized the judiciary for showing deference to the executive. Au promptly removed the post. In October 2014, Senior State Counsel Tai Wei Shyong, acting for the attorney-general, urged the High Court to hold Au in contempt of court for two Yawning Bread articles that made it seem that there is a "systemic bias" in Singapore's judiciary against cases involving homosexuality. In his defence, Au's lawyers, Peter Low and Choo Zheng Xi, accused the AG of being "trigger-happy" in taking their client to court on "imputation, innuendo and insinuation". On 22 January 2015, Au was held to be guilty of scandalising the court in respect of one of his two Yawning Bread articles, and cleared of the second charge. The Court of Appeal rejected his appeal on 1 December 2015.
