= Oogachaga =

LGBTQ+ organization

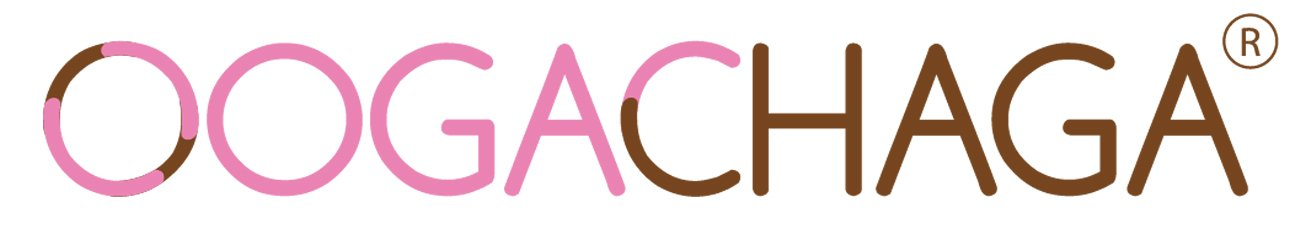
- Formation: 1999
- Founders: Jason Wee, Steve Wong, Kenneth Lau, Clarence Singam
- Type: Nonprofit organization
- Headquarters: 57B Pagoda Street, Singapore 059216
- Region served: Singapore (WhatsApp helpline serves Brunei, Indonesia, and Malaysia as well)
- Executive Director: Leow Yangfa
- Website: https://oogachaga.com/

Oogachaga is a Singaporean LGBTQ+ organization. The organization was founded in 1999 and offers counseling, support groups, and professional workshops. The organization also offers email/WhatsApp hotline services for people in Singapore, Brunei, Indonesia, and Malaysia.

== History ==
Oogachaga was founded in 1999 by Jason Wee with his friends Kenneth Lau and Steve Wong; it was created to be a network of support groups for young gay people. The group was named after the song a hallcinated baby danced to in the show Ally McBeal; the song, "Hooked on a Feeling", begins with an opening chorus repeating "ooga-chaga."

The organization initially started as a single support group in a member's living room. Clarence Singam, Wee's significant other, joined as a cofounder after being invited to a support group that helped him accept himself.

In 2000, the organization began offering a volunteer-run counseling service. The organization started providing workshops for practitioners in 2003. In 2004, Oogachaga became legally registered as a nonprofit. The organization's first women's support group, Oogachaga Women, started in 2005. Oogachaga opened Singapore's first LGBT+ helpline, OC line, in 2006.

In 2008, Oogachaga set up a counseling center with full time staff. The following year, they expanded their counseling services to be available over email with the launch of CARE email counseling. A small-scale transgender support pragram was launched in 2011. In 2012, the organization launched an LGBTQ+ resource portal called Congregaytion. Hotline services expanded to WhatsApp in 2013, and the next year saw the introduction of a hotline aimed towards queer women called Women on Wednesdays.

Former executive director Bryan Choong spoke at the pre-UPR (Universal Periodic Review) session in Geneva, Switzerland at the end of 2015. Oogachaga began collaborating with Pink Dot on the UPR; they made joint submissions in 2016 and 2021.

In 2017, Minister for Law and Home Affairs K. Shanmugam visited Oogachaga's office in Chinatown to discuss LGBT issues. He spoke with Bryan Choong; they discussed drug use in the LGBT community and criticisms around that year's Pink Dot event including alleged harassment towards sponsors. The Oogachaga and Congregaytion websites were redesigned in 2018 due to the contributions of the Canadian High Commission in Singapore.

In May 2021, Oogachaga and the US Embassy cohosted a webinar called "The Economic Case for LGBT Equality: Exploring Global Trends with Professor Lee Badgett." Singapore's Ministry of Foreign Affairs made a statement on the event, reminding the US embassy not to "interfere in domestic social and political matters."

== Services ==
Oogachaga provides services with its team of sixty volunteers and four full time staff members. One of Oogachaga's projects is the Mature Men Project. It includes support groups with weekly activities, tea sessions to discuss personal issues (Mature Men Teatime), and surveys on the needs of older queer men. The project is aimed towards men age 40 and older and funded by the MAC AIDS Fund.

Oogachaga also offers group sessions open to both LGBT+ and non-LGBT+ people. For instance, the organization offered sharing sessions in 2014 called "Open Door" which were for gay and bisexual men as well as straight men. In 2023, Oogachaga started provided support groups under the My Family Matters initiative; the support groups were aimed towards family members of LGBTQ+ people and cohosted by Pink Dot.

Oogachaga's phone helpline ended in July 2022 due to lack of demand, but the email and WhatsApp counseling lines are still operating. The WhatsApp service accepts clients from Singapore, Brunei, Malaysia, and Indonesia. Oogachaga also offers professional counseling for individuals and couples or families at the cost of $120 and $160 respectively.

Oogachaga offers training workshops for counselors and social workers. Between 2009 and 2016, the organization "conducted more than 50 training sessions and workshops for close to 1,500 counselling professionals in the social work, general healthcare and mental healthcare sectors." Workshops include sensitivity training and education on gender identity and sexuality. The workshops teach professionals how to interact with LGBTQ clients and their families as well as help their clients cope with minority stress, homophobia, transphobia, and their sexuality.

== See also ==
- LGBTQ rights in Singapore
- LGBTQ culture in Singapore
