= Utopia (website) =

Asian LGBTQ website

Utopia is a website offering free information about LGBTQ culture in 20+ countries in the Asia-Pacific region.

Utopia was preceded by the opening of Southeast Asia's first gay and lesbian center, one year earlier, on December 15, 1994. Goss and partners from Singapore, Thailand and the United States opened the Utopia complex in the Sukhumvit Road area of Bangkok and it included an LGBT bookshop, cafe, pub and guesthouse. The center went on to host author readings, women's workshops, AIDS/HIV education and fundraising, and Bangkok's first International Lesbian and Gay Film/Video Festival: Hearts of Light (Oct 11-19, 1996), programmed by Canadian filmmaker, Paul Lee.

Utopia was the first website providing pan-Asian LGBT information in a non-pornographic format. The website went on to garner recognition from TIME Magazine, Lonely Planet, Yahoo!, Gay Times, Advocate and BBC World Service.

Utopia was a founding sponsor of the first Bangkok Gay Festival in 1999.

The annual Utopia Awards was established in 2000 to give special recognition to gay and lesbian pioneers in Asia and other worthy groups and individuals who have made outstanding contributions to Asia's LGBT community.

From 2005 to 2007, Goss began publication of ten landmark Utopia Guide books to gay and lesbian life in China; Cambodia/Laos/Myanmar/Vietnam; Thailand; Singapore; Malaysia; Indonesia; Japan; South Korea; Taiwan; and Asia (16 countries).
