= LGBTQ rights in Singapore =

- Singapore
- Legal status: Legal (Note: Homosexuality always legal for females, for males de facto since 2007, de jure since 2022.)
- Gender identity: Legal (Note: Gender-affirming surgery (also known as sex reassignment surgery) is legal and recognised.)
- Military: Yes
- Discrimination protections: Protections from incitement of religiously motivated anti-LGBT harassment and violence

Family rights
- Recognition of relationships: No
- Adoption: Limited

The rights of lesbian, gay, bisexual, transgender and queer (LGBTQ) people in Singapore have evolved over the decades. Same-sex sexual activity is legal for both males and females. Until January 2023, sexual activity between men was illegal under Section 377A of the Penal Code, while sexual activity between women was never illegal. In February 2022, the Court of Appeal in the Supreme Court ruled that 377A was "unenforceable in its entirety", and the law was officially repealed in January 2023. Singapore does not recognise same-sex marriage or civil unions. Transgender rights in Singapore are also progressive in the region; in 1973 it became the first Asian country to legalise sex reassignment surgery.

On 21 August 2022, Prime Minister Lee Hsien Loong announced that the Government intended to repeal Section 377A of the Penal Code, effectively ending criminalisation both de facto and de jure. On 22 August 2022, Home Affairs and Law Minister K. Shanmugam added that the Constitution would be amended to protect Parliament's right to define marriage instead of the judiciary, which is the Supreme Court, leaving open the possibility for Parliament to legalise same-sex marriages or civil unions through a simple majority. On 29 November 2022, the repeal of Section 377A of the Penal Code was passed in Parliament.

Same-sex marriages are not recognised, including the adoption of children by same-sex couples, although a gay Singaporean man with a male partner in 2018 won a landmark appeal to adopt a child that he had fathered through a surrogate. In 2018, Education Minister Ong Ye Kung reassured the LGBTQ community that discrimination against the LGBTQ community at work, in housing and education will not be tolerated. Since 2019, protections against anti-gay violence and aggravated discrimination were also put into legislation; Shanmugam stated that "LGBTQ persons, non-LGBTQ persons, we are all equal. We are not any lesser by reason of our sexual orientation."

While Singaporean society is generally regarded as conservative, LGBTQ pride festivals such as Pink Dot have taken place every year since 2009 with increasing attendance amounting to the tens of thousands. In line with worldwide trends, attitudes towards members of the LGBTQ community among Singaporeans are slowly changing and becoming more socially accepting and tolerant.

== Legality of same-sex sexual activity ==
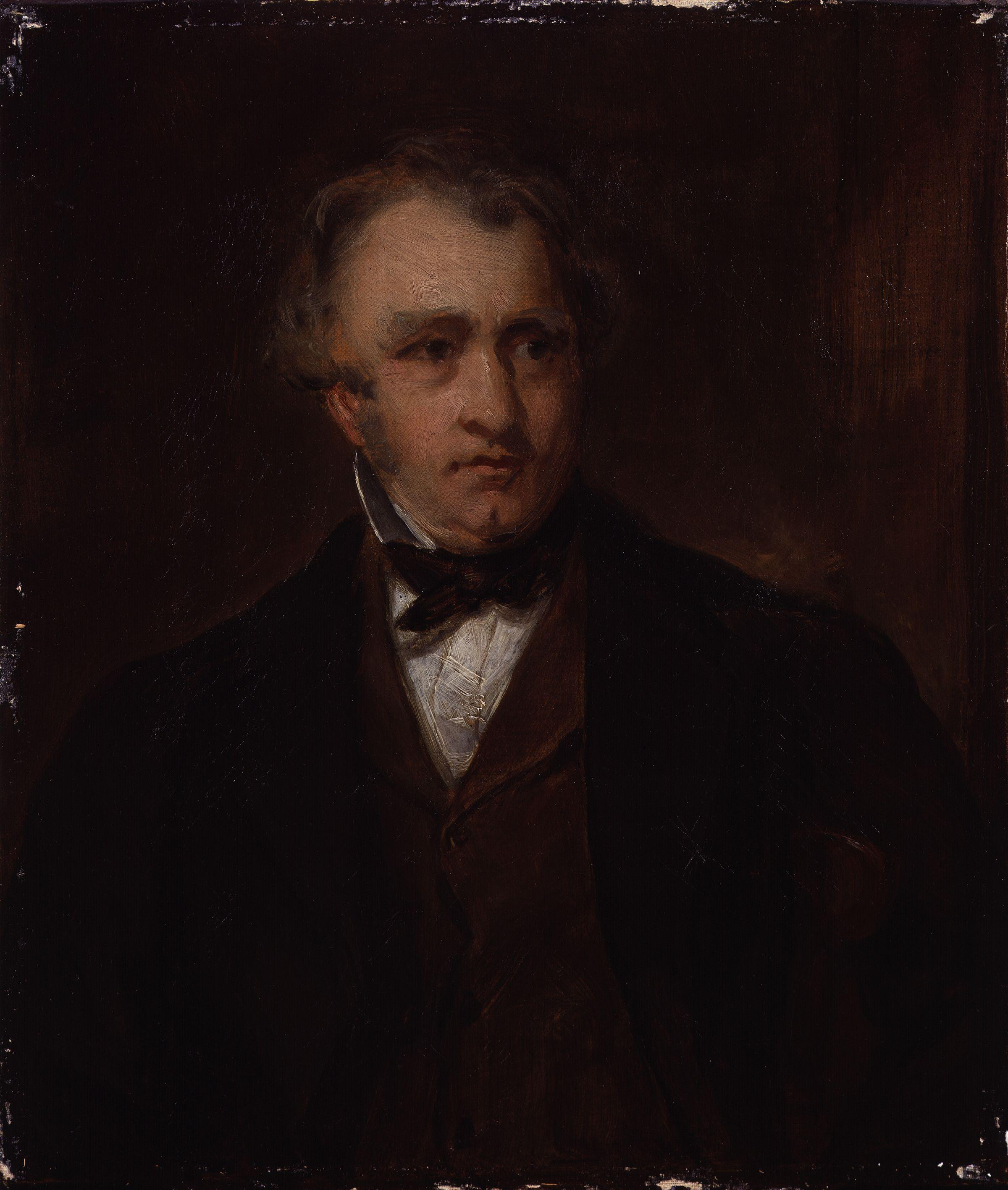
The British Whig politician Thomas Macaulay chaired a commission to criminalise sodomy in various British colonies.

Singapore law inherited from the British Empire in 1871 prohibited sodomy regardless of sex. As such, heterosexual and homosexual anal or oral sex was illegal. In 2007, such sexual activity was legalised except for sex between men. The punishment was two years' imprisonment.

In 2018 Attorney-General Lucien Wong declared that he still had the legal power to prosecute under Section 377A. This statement was made amid public debate over the law and in response to opinions of former attorneys-general that the public prosecutor had, in effect, been limited from pursuit of such cases. Wong said that while "the public prosecutor did not pursue cases between consenting adults and in private places as it was not in the public interest" an attorney-general could direct that such a prosecution be mounted, "if reports are lodged with police, particularly in relation to minors". The statement was made prior to the ruling by the Singapore Court of Appeals that the section was unenforceable as a proscription of same-sex sexual activity. Public indecency and protection of minors were the only cases pursued under the section from 2007, even prior to the ruling.

In June 2019, at the Smart Nation Summit, Prime Minister Lee Hsien Loong reiterated that Singapore would keep Section 377A "for some time" saying, "Whatever your sexual orientation is, you're welcome to come and work in Singapore... You know our rules in Singapore. It is the way this society is: We are not like San Francisco, neither are we like some countries in the Middle East. [We are] something in between, it is the way the society is."

While Singaporean courts ruled in 2022 that section 377A was entirely unenforceable as regards private consensual same-sex sexual activity, police are able to act on reports of public indecency (public acts by persons of any gender) from the community. Prosecution under this section of any matters involving minors is also still possible. All recent prosecutions under the section — between 2007 and 2013 — were incidences of these types.

On 21 August 2022 Lee announced at the National Day Rally that the Government intended to repeal Section 377A, noting that there would be significant risk of the law being struck down in future legal challenges "on the grounds that it breaches Article 12 of the Constitution – the Equal Protection provision". Lee added that the repeal would be deliberated through Parliament. After a two-day debate on 28 and 29 November, Section 377A was officially repealed in Parliament.

=== Statutes ===
After an exhaustive Penal Code review in 2007, oral and anal sex were legalised between opposite-sex persons and between women. The changes meant that oral and anal sex between consenting heterosexual and female homosexual adults were no longer offences. However, Section 377A, which deals with these sexual acts, continued to criminalise them between consenting men. Despite this, the section had not been enforced since at least 2007. Lee stated amid the debates on the changes to the section that the law would not be proactively enforced. The parliamentary debates and the prime minister's statement played a role in the 2022 ruling of the Court of Appeal in the Supreme Court that the law was unenforceable.

In his concluding speech on the debate over the partial repeal of Section 377A, Lee told the members of parliament (MPs) before the vote that "Singapore is basically a conservative society... The family is the basic building block of this society. And by a family in Singapore, we mean one man, one woman, marrying, having children and bringing up children within that framework of a stable family unit."

==== Section 377A ("Outrages on decency") ====
Section 377A states that: "Any male person who, in public or private, commits, or abets the commission of, or procures or attempts to procure the commission by any male person of, any act of gross indecency with another male person, shall be punished with imprisonment for a term which may extend to 2 years." According to the United States Department of State, and Human Dignity Trust, the last attempted prosecution for consensual same-sex sexual activity occurred in 2010. Between 2007 and 2013, all nine convictions under 377A provisions, involved minors or public acts of gross indecency.

==== Section 354 of the Penal Code ("Outrage of Modesty") ====
Section 354 provides that if any person uses criminal force on any person intending to outrage, or knowing it would be likely to outrage, the modesty of that person, he shall be imprisoned for a maximum of two years, or with fine, or with caning, or with any two of such punishments. Crimes charged under section 354 require some physical contact involved.

==== Section 294 of the Penal Code ====
If the victim of an entrapment operation uses a symbolic gesture to signal intention to have sexual activity with the police decoy, he can be tried under Section 294 of the Penal Code, which covers the commission of any obscene act in any public place to the annoyance of others, subject to a maximum of three months imprisonment, a fine, or both.

==== Miscellaneous Offences (Public Order and Nuisance) Act ====
According to the National University of Singapore sociologist Laurence Leong Wai Teng, from 1990 to 1994 there were 11 cases where gay men were charged for soliciting. They were fined between $200 and $500.

=== Efforts to repeal 377A ===
Prior to 2022, human rights activists had called for the repeal of Section 377A, arguing that it infringes on privacy, the right to life and personal liberty, the latter two of which are constitutionally protected. In 2007, the Singapore Democratic Party (SDP) called for the repeal of Section 377A.

In 2012, Tan Eng Hong was found in the company of another man, and was initially charged with Section 377A but later pled guilty to a lesser charge. Tan decided to pursue his case against Section 377A on the grounds that it was inconsistent with Articles 9, 12, and 14 of the Singapore Constitution. These articles guarantee the right to life and personal liberty, and provide that all people are entitled to equal protection before the law. In deciding whether an appeal of Tan's case could be heard in the Supreme Court, the Court of Appeal found that Section 377A may "arguably" violate the right to equality before law as offered in Article 12. The ruling however did not go into the merits of the case on technical grounds.

Tan's case was heard in the Supreme Court jointly with another appeal challenging Section 377A, and a ruling was given on 29 October 2014. The ruling upheld the country's ban on same-sex relations between consenting adult men. The court held that Section 377A does not violate Articles 9 and 12 of the Singapore Constitution. The applicant's attorney argued that Section 377A criminalises a group of people for an innate attribute, though the court concluded that "there is, at present, no definitive conclusion" on the "supposed immutability" of homosexuality. The court ultimately held that law reforms permitting private homosexual sex were a question for the Singapore Parliament to address.

In September 2018, following the high-profile repeal of Section 377 of the Indian Penal Code by the Supreme Court of India, more than 50,000 people, including a former attorney-general and several former diplomats, signed a petition called "READY4REPEAL" urging the repeal of Section 377A as part of a major penal code review. However, government officials at the time refused to do so. The diplomat Tommy Koh and the former attorney-general Walter Woon have called on members of the LGBTQ community to challenge the law.

Soon after the repeal of Section 377 in India in 2018, a Singaporean DJ, Johnson Ong Ming, filed a suit with the High Court arguing that Singapore's Section 377A is "in violation of human dignity". Section 377 of the Indian Penal Code and Section 377A of the Singapore Penal Code are effectively identical, as both were put in place by the British Empire, raising hopes in Singapore that the discriminatory law would be struck down as well. Singapore's High Court gave the petitioner until 20 November to submit his arguments.

In November 2018 the LGBTQ rights activist Bryan Choong Chee Hong filed another case with the Supreme Court, arguing that Section 377A is "inconsistent" with portions of the Constitution, and "is therefore void". According to court documents, the petitioner argues that Section 377A is inconsistent with Article 9, Article 12, and Article 14 of the Constitution.

A third legal challenge was launched in September 2019 by Roy Tan Seng Kee, a retired medical doctor. Tan stated in a statement that, "by institutionalising discrimination, it alienates [LGBTQ people] from having a sense of belonging and purposeful place in our society, and prevents them from taking pride in Singapore's achievements."

All three cases were dismissed by the High Court on 30 March 2020 in a closed-door judgment by Justice See Kee Oon.

=== 377A officially repealed ===
On 21 August 2022 Lee announced that the government would table a motion in Parliament to repeal Section 377A, effectively decriminalising male homosexual acts. On 20 October 2022 the government tabled the bill. After a two-day debate, Section 377A of the Penal Code was officially repealed in Parliament on 29 November 2022.

== Recognition of same-sex relationships ==
Singapore currently does not recognise same-sex relationships in any form (such as marriage, civil unions or domestic partnerships). In the National Day Rally for 2022, Prime Minister Lee Hsien Loong announced that while section 377A will be repealed, the current heterosexual definition of marriage may be enshrined in the Constitution of Singapore.

The announcement of possibly enshrining the current heterosexual definition of marriage in the constitution was met with some initial misinterpretations. On 22 August 2022, Home Affairs and Law Minister K. Shanmugam clarified that the Constitution will be amended to protect Parliament's right to define marriage, instead of the judiciary, which is the Supreme Court of Singapore, leaving open the possibility for Parliament to change the definition of marriage through a simple majority in the future, such as legalising same-sex marriages or civil unions.

He clarified that the definition of marriage will not be enshrined in the Constitution, stating that "any political party or group that wants to push for same-sex marriage will be able to do so." – if they have a simple majority in Parliament. Subsequently, on 20 October 2022 the government tabled a draft constitutional amendment, which was debated by the Parliament on 28 November 2022 along with a bill repealing Section 377A. The amendment was passed on 29 November 2022.

Due to this constitutional amendment, and the precedent set by the Women's Charter reading that marriage not between a woman and man is void, only heterosexual marriages are recognised.

== Adoption and parenting ==
In December 2018, a gay Singaporean man won the right to adopt his son who was fathered in the United States through a surrogate, in a landmark appeal. The Singapore High Court overturned a 2017 ruling in which a district judge had barred the man from legally adopting his son because the child was conceived through in vitro fertilisation (which is only limited to heterosexual married couples) and brought to term through surrogacy, which is banned. In response, the Minister for Social and Family Development, Desmond Lee, announced in January 2019 that the government was seeking to strengthen Singapore's adoption laws to prevent more same-sex adoption cases. The Minister also stated that the government does not support "the formation of family units with children of homosexual parents through institutions and processes such as adoption". However, this statement has not yet been made into a law.

Children born out of wedlock are considered illegitimate under Singaporean law and are ineligible for certain social benefits unless they are legally adopted. This has led to difficulties for same-sex couples seeking to start families, as they are unable to adopt children. Despite the challenges, Singapore has been at the forefront of discussions on LGBTQ rights in Asia, having made progress towards decriminalising homosexuality and recognising same-sex relationships.

The case of the gay Singaporean who won the right to adopt his son in 2018 was a significant milestone for LGBTQ rights in the country. The court's decision to overturn the previous ruling was hailed as a victory for LGBTQ rights activists. However, the government's response to the case was less enthusiastic, sparking a renewed debate on the issue of same-sex adoption in Singapore. Advocates for LGBTQ rights argued that the government's stance was discriminatory and went against the principles of equality and non-discrimination.

The lack of legal recognition for same-sex couples in Singapore has meant that they are unable to access many of the same benefits and rights as heterosexual couples, including healthcare benefits, inheritance rights, and social security benefits. Despite these challenges, the LGBTQ community in Singapore continues to push for greater recognition and acceptance. In recent years, there has been a growing acceptance of LGBTQ rights, with many businesses and organisations showing their support for the community.

== Discrimination protections ==
In 2018 Education Minister Ong Ye Kung reassured the LGBTQ community that discrimination against LGBTQ community at work, in housing and education will not be tolerated.

In 2019 the Maintenance of Religious Harmony Act was amended to protect the LGBTQ community from religiously motivated violence. Legal action can be taken against a religious group or its members for urging violence against certain "target groups". The Explanatory Statement states: "The target group need not be confined to persons who practise a certain religion. The target group may be made up of atheists, individuals from a specific racial community, who share a similar sexual orientation, or have a certain nationality or descent like foreign workers or new citizens."

In 2022 Home Affairs and Law Minister K. Shanmugam confirmed that LGBTQ people were protected against threats or acts of violence.

== Military service ==
Prior to 2003, homosexuals were barred from being employed in "sensitive positions" within the Singapore Civil Service. During the 20th century, some conscripts in National Service were encouraged to attend conversion therapy. In the past, some Singaporean conscripts who openly declared their homosexuality may also be excluded from officer training, including being refused security clearances needed to perform higher roles in the army.

== Conversion therapy ==
In January 2006 the Ministry of Community Development, Youth and Sports (MCYS) granted S$100,000 (US$61,500) to Liberty League, an organisation affiliated with the "ex-gay" movement, to promote conversion therapy. The organisation says it "promotes gender and sexual health for the individual, family and society". However, due to pressure from gay rights activists, Liberty League returned this grant to the ministry, and the organisation has been defunct since 2014.

In May 2020 Minister for Health Gan Kim Yong indicated the government's position against conversion therapy in a written reply to a question from Nominated Member of Parliament Anthea Ong. The reply reads, "(The Ministry of Health) expects doctors and other healthcare professionals to practice according to evidence-based best practice and clinical ethics, and to consider and respect patients' preferences and circumstances (including sexual orientation) when providing care... members of the public can submit a formal complaint to the Singapore Medical Council (SMC) if a doctor is acting unethically or providing inappropriate treatment." Nevertheless, he added in a separate statement that the Ministry of Health had not received any such complaint from self-declared LGBTQ patients in the past three years.

== Living conditions ==
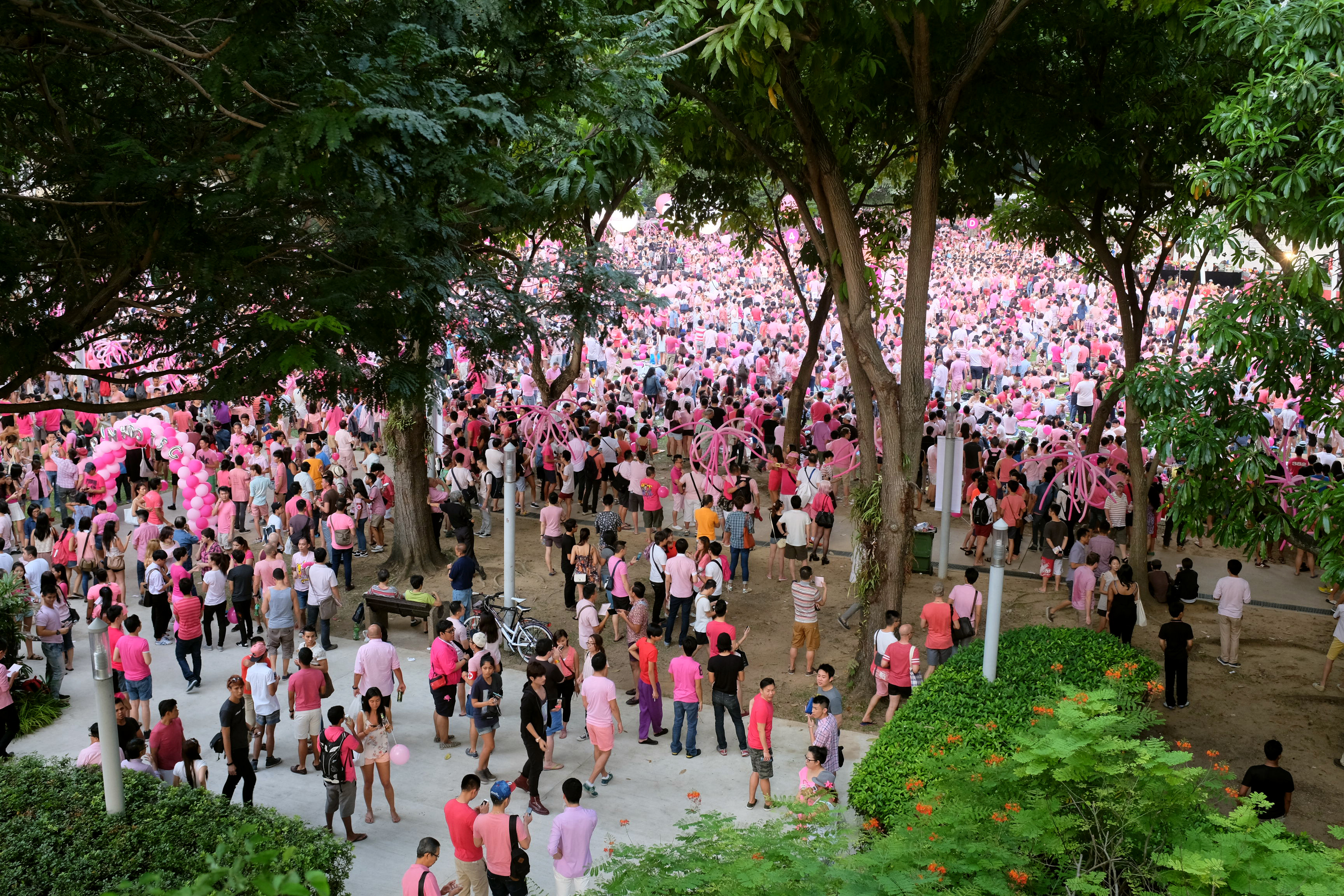
Members of the LGBTQ community converging at Hong Lim Park in Singapore for Pink Dot SG in 2014

In 2014 Singaporean government representatives spoke positively about LGBTQ Singaporean citizens at a United Nations anti-discrimination committee, stating that "homosexuals are free to lead their lives and pursue their social activities. Gay groups have held public discussions and published websites, and there are films and plays on gay themes and gay bars and clubs in Singapore."

=== Media ===
The Media Development Authority (MDA), a statutory board of the Ministry of Communications and Information (MCI), currently limits the "promotion or glamorisation of the homosexual lifestyle" on television and the radio. Examples include issuing higher age ratings (e.g. NC16, M18 or R21) for television shows or films that depicts sexual activity between persons of the same gender.

In July 2019 the Singaporean rapper Joshua Su, better known as The G3sha, came out as gay in a new song titled "I'm OK" that highlights his childhood, the homophobia he faced, and coming to terms with his sexuality. Days later, he pulled out of a TEDx radio talk in protest after claiming that he was censored and asked not to make "sensitive" comments about his sexuality.

=== Gender neutral toilets ===
Yale-NUS College and Tembusu College of the National University of Singapore have gender-neutral toilets for their students.

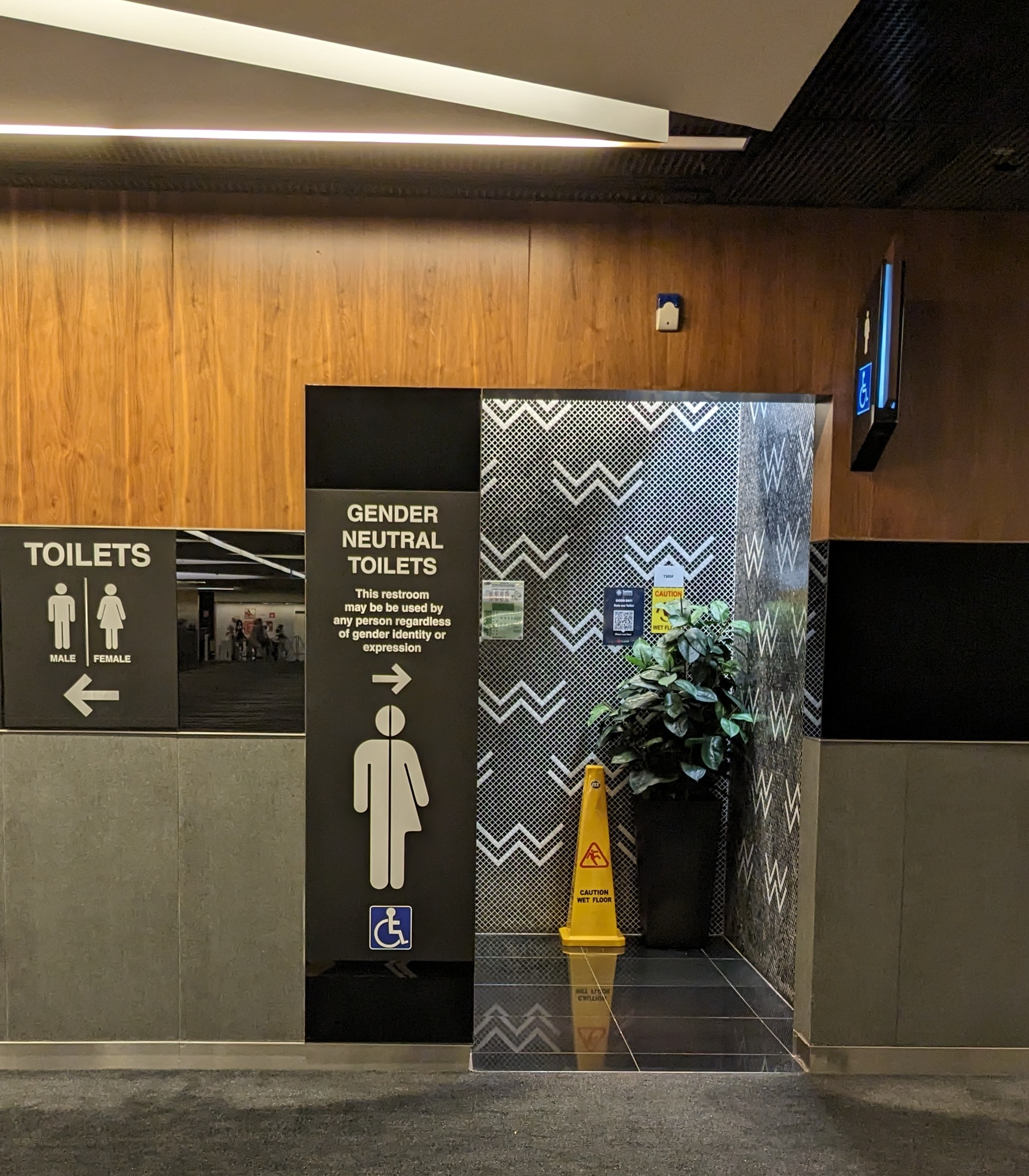
Temporary gender neutral toilet in Suntec Singapore Convention and Exhibition Centre for Wikimania 2023

During Wikimania 2023, which was held at the Suntec Singapore Convention and Exhibition Centre from 16 to 19 August 2023, a female toilet was temporarily converted to a gender-neutral toilet. The toilet attracted attention from the public when a picture was first posted on Instagram and subsequently on other forums. The Facebook group "We Are Against Pinkdot in Singapore" threatened a boycott against Suntec with users seeking petitions against the implementation of the gender neutral toilet. PinkDot SG and non-profit group Oogachaga responded that gender neutral toilets are a complement to gendered toilets and can co-exist together. They do not seek to replace traditional gendered toilets.

=== Public opinion ===
==== 2000s ====
A 2005 poll by the Nanyang Technological University found that 69% of Singaporeans viewed homosexuality negatively and 23% viewed it positively. In 2010 these numbers had changed to 64.5% negatively and 25% positively.

==== 2010s ====
In a 2013 Singaporean poll by the Institute of Policy Studies, 78% of respondents opposed same-sex marriage.

A 2018 opinion poll by Ipsos found that 55% of Singaporeans supported Section 377A. On the other hand, one-third of Singaporeans declared themselves more accepting of same-sex relationships and human rights than five years prior.

In 2019 a poll conducted by YouGov with 1,033 respondents showed that about one-third (34%) of Singaporeans backed same-sex partnerships, while 43% opposed their legalisation, and the remaining 23% were uncertain. Support was more notable among younger respondents: 50% of people aged 18 to 34 supported civil partnerships and 20% were opposed. In contrast, only 22% of those aged 55 and over supported. 41% of university degree holders agreed with the legalisation of same-sex partnerships, whereas only 26% of respondents without a university degree were in favour. Of those who considered themselves "very much" religious, only 23% supported civil partnerships. 51% of people who considered themselves "not at all" religious expressed support. Apart from irreligious people, majority support for same-sex partnerships was also found in respondents who identified as LGBTQ (71% against 22%) and those who personally knew a person in a same-sex relationship (52% against 33%).

A survey conducted by the Institute of Policy Studies between August 2018 and January 2019 revealed that Singaporean society was still largely conservative but becoming more liberal on LGBTQ rights. The survey showed that more than 20% of people said that sexual relations between adults of the same sex were not wrong at all or not wrong most of the time, a rise of about 10% from 2013. Around 27% felt the same way about same-sex marriage (up from 15% in 2013) and 30% did so about same-sex couples adopting a child (up from 24% in 2013).

A 2019 poll conducted by the Institute of Policy Studies found that opposition to same-sex marriage in Singapore had fallen to 60%, down from 74% in 2013. The poll also found that nearly six in ten Singaporeans aged between 18 and 25 believed same-sex marriage is not wrong.

In June 2019 an online survey conducted by Yahoo Singapore asked 887 Singaporeans how they would react to a number of LGBT-related situations. When asked about an LGBTQ family member coming out, 53% of the respondents said they would react negatively: 14% expressed a "strongly negative" response, while 39% reported a "somewhat negative" reaction. When asked about a colleague coming out, 53% reported a positive reaction, while 46% reported a negative reaction. When asked about the marriage of Li Huanwu — the grandson of Singapore's founding prime minister, Lee Kuan Yew — to his partner, Heng Yirui, 54% reacted negatively to the marriage. Meanwhile, 46% reacted positively to it. When asked about Pink Dot SG, 55% of respondents said that they strongly or somewhat support Pink Dot Singapore, but the remaining 45% opposed it. 80% of Singaporeans agreed that LGBTQ people face discrimination.

Also in June 2019, an online survey conducted by Blackbox Research revealed that 56% of Singaporeans were opposed to other countries following Taiwan's example in legalising same-sex marriage, while 44% answered "yes". When asked on how they felt that more than 300 same-sex couples were married in Taiwan the first week after the new law was passed, about 49% of those surveyed felt positive about the statement, with 14% feeling "strongly positive" and 35% feeling "somewhat positive". Conversely, 51% responded negatively to this, 20% felt "strongly negative" and 31% were "somewhat negative". The respondents were also asked about how they felt concerning the decriminalisation of homosexuality in Bhutan. About 55% of respondents felt positive, with 15% feeling "strongly positive" and 40% were "somewhat positive". Conversely, about 44% responded negatively, 11% felt "strongly negative" and 33% felt "somewhat negative".

==== 2020s ====
A TODAY Youth Survey in 2021 found high acceptance of LGBTQ people among Singaporean youth: "80% were willing to work with LGBTQ people (6% disagreed), 75% were willing to form close friendships with them (10% disagreed) and 58% were willing to accept LGBTQ family members (18% disagreed)."

In 2022, an Ipsos survey found that only 44% of Singapore residents support the retention of section 377A. Furthermore, 20% oppose the law its entirety, up from 12% in the last 2018 survey. For the remaining 36%, 32% said they neither support nor oppose the law, while 4% preferred not to say.

A poll by Pew Research Center in 2023 found that support for same-sex marriage in Singapore has risen to 45% and opposition has fallen to 51%. 53% of Buddhists, 60% of Hindus and 62% of irreligious people support same-sex marriage.

An Ipsos poll in June 2024 found an increase in support for gay rights with 54% of Singaporean agreed that same-sex couples should be able to get married or have legal recognition (25% disagreed, 21% were neutral) and 57% agreed that they should be able to adopt (30% disagreed, 13% were neutral). 73% agreed that LGBTQ people should be protected from discrimination.

=== Demographics ===
In May 2019 a study by the National University of Singapore estimated that there were 210,000 men who have sex with men (MSM) in Singapore. The study estimates were more than double the previous estimates of 90,000 MSM, and said they could be at risk of a concentrated epidemic of HIV.

=== Pink Dot ===
Pink Dot SG is an annual event that started in 2009 in support of the LGBT community in Singapore. In recent years, record crowds of approximately 28,000 have attended the rally, with a heavy bent toward younger demographics. On 29 June 2019, during the 11th Pink Dot, Lee Hsien Yang, the brother of Prime Minister Lee Hsien Loong, as well as his wife and second son Li Huanwu and Li's husband, Heng Yirui, attended the event. On 18 June 2022 the People's Action Party (PAP) MP Henry Kwek attended the 14th Pink Dot. Kwek's attendance was the first time that an MP from the governing PAP has physically shown their support for the event.

== Summary table ==
	Acceptability	Notes
Legal same-sex sexual activity	Yes	Females always legal, males de facto since 2007, de jure since 2022.
Equal age of consent	Yes	Since 2022.
Anti-discrimination laws in employment only	No	
Anti-discrimination laws in the provision of goods and services	Yes	
Anti-discrimination laws in all other areas (incl. indirect discrimination, hate speech)	Yes	Since 2019, specifically protection against incitement of anti-gay aggravated harassment and violence.
Same-sex marriages	No	
Recognition of same-sex couples	No	
Stepchild adoption by same-sex couples	No	However, in 2018, a gay Singaporean man with a male partner won an appeal to adopt a child that he fathered through a surrogate.
Joint adoption by same-sex couples	No	
Adoption by single people regardless of sexual orientation	Yes	
Conversion therapy banned	No	
Gays, lesbians and bisexuals allowed to serve in the military	Yes	Since 2003.
Access to IVF for lesbians	No	Can freeze eggs since 2022, but need to be in a legal marriage to use them. Same-sex marriage is currently illegal.
Commercial surrogacy for gay male couples	No	Illegal for all couples regardless of sexual orientation.
MSMs allowed to donate blood	No	Lifetime ban for any man who has ever had any sexual contact with a man.
Transgender right to change legal name	Yes	Deed poll and statutory declaration available
Transgender right to change legal gender	Yes	Since 1973, first country in Asia to do so. Requires that genitalia are "completely" changed from one sex to the other.
Transgender right to access medical treatment	Yes	Always legal
Transgender right to marry	Yes	Since 1996, after an amendment was made to the Women's Charter
Transgender people allowed in military service	Yes	Since the 1990s (Note: See transgender people in Singapore#National service for more details.)

== See also ==
- Human rights in Singapore
- LGBTQ rights in Asia
- LGBTQ culture in Singapore
- LGBTQ history in Singapore
- Recognition of same-sex unions in Singapore
- Transgender people in Singapore
- Pink Dot SG
