= SS Hong Moh =

Coordinates: 23°14′N 117°17′E

History

United Kingdom
- Name: SS City of Calcutta
- Owner: George Smith & Sons, Glasgow
- Operator: City Line Ltd.
- Port of registry: Glasgow
- Builder: Charles Connell & Co., Scotstoun
- Yard number: 125
- Launched: 8 September 1881
- Identification: Official number: 85862
- Fate: Sold, 1902

Straits Settlements
- Name: SS Hong Moh
- Owner: Lim Ho Puah (1902-11); Lim Peng Siang (1911-14)
- Operator: Wee Bin & Co. (1902-11); Ho Hong Steamship Co. (1911-21)
- Acquired: 1902
- Fate: Wrecked, 3 March 1921

General characteristics
- Type: Cargo ship
- Tonnage: 3,954 GRT
- Length: 400 ft (120 m)
- Beam: 42 ft 1 in (12.83 m)
- Draught: 30 ft 1 in (9.17 m)
- Propulsion: Triple expansion steam engine

SS Hong Moh was a passenger ship that was wrecked on the White Rocks off Lamock Island, Swatow, on 3 March 1921 with the loss of about 900 lives.

== City of Calcutta ==
The ship was built by Charles Connell & Company of Scotstoun, and was launched on 8 September 1881 as SS City of Calcutta for George Smith & Sons' City Line. The 3,954 GRT ship was 400 feet (120 m) long, 42 feet 1 inch (12.83 m) in the beam, with a draught of 30 feet 1 inch (9.17 m), and was powered by a triple expansion steam engine.

== Hong Moh ==
In 1902 the ship was sold to Lim Ho Puah of Singapore, and renamed SS Hong Moh to operate in the fleet of Wee Bin & Co. In 1911 the ship was transferred to Lim Peng Siang, the son of Lim Ho Puah, when the Wee Bin company was liquidated, and operated by the Ho Hong Steamship Company.

=== Sinking ===
Hong Moh sailed from Hong Kong on 2 March 1921, bound for Swatow, under the command of Henry William Holmes, with a crew of 48 and 1,135 passengers aboard. When she arrived off Swatow on the morning of 3 March, the ship anchored off Bill Island and signalled for a pilot to take her in. When the pilot arrived he informed the master that his ship's draught was too great to cross the bar, so the ship set a course for Amoy. About two hours later, at 7.20 p.m., in rough seas and poor visibility, the ship struck the north-west point of the White Rocks. The weather deteriorated, making it impossible to launch any lifeboats, and at 3 a.m. on 4 March the ship broke in two.

Several ships passed within sight of Hong Moh, but having lost electrical power she was unable to signal them. Finally at 9. a.m SS Shansi approached Hong Moh, and attempted to launch her boats. This failed, but the ship stood by until the afternoon of 5 March, rescuing several passengers and crew who had abandoned ship and attempted to swim to safety, many drowning in the process, including the master. Shansi then sailed into Swatow with about 45 survivors aboard, to procure further assistance for the stricken ship.

The British Consul in Swatow informed the Senior Naval Officer at Hong Kong, who broadcast a radio message requesting ships to come to Hong Moh's assistance. The Acacia-class sloop HMS Foxglove responded, arriving off Swatow around 10.30 p.m, but was unable to locate the wreck in the darkness. At dawn the next morning the C-class cruiser HMS Carlisle arrived, and together the two ships rescued more survivors from the wreck. Running short of fuel Foxglove sailed for Hong Kong at 5 p.m. with 48 survivors aboard, while Carlisle continued to work throughout the night using searchlights, and into the next day. Carlisle's captain, Edward Evans, swam over to the wreck at around 8 p.m on 7 March to help the last few survivors aboard the ship's boats. Rescue operations were finally abandoned at 11 p.m. At dawn on 8 March Carlisle's boats approached the wreck, but found no signs of life, so Carlisle departed for Hong Kong with 220 survivors aboard.

Captain Evans of Carlisle, along with Lieutenant-Commander Ion Tower and Gunner John G. Dewar were awarded the Board of Trade Silver Medal for Gallantry in Saving Life at Sea, while Leading Seaman W. G. Eldrett and Able Seaman A. E. Whitehead received the award in Bronze.

== Sources ==
- "Wreck of Hong-Kong Steamer", The Times, 9 March 1921
- "Finding of the Marine Court of Enquiry in connection with the stranding of the S.S. Hong Moh", (PDF) Hong Kong Government Gazette, 27 May 1921
- "Gallantry at Sea", The Times, 29 October 1921
- Medal Citation for Evans and Dewar, The Times, 16 February 1923
