= Seow Poh Leng =

Singaporean businessman (1883–1942)

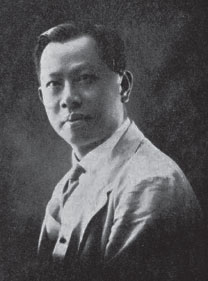
- Seow in One Hundred Years' History of the Chinese in Singapore (1923)
- Born: 1883; Singapore, Straits Settlements
- Died: 1942 (aged 58–59); Japanese-occupied Singapore
- Occupation: Banker
- Spouse(s): Lilian Tan Lark Neo (alias Lilian Tan Luck Neo), Polly Tan Poh Li Polly Tan Poh Li (m. 1920)
- Children: 5
- Father: Seow Chye Watt

Seow Poh Leng
- Traditional Chinese: 蕭保齡
- Simplified Chinese: 萧保龄
Transcriptions
Standard Mandarin
- Hanyu Pinyin: Xiāo Bǎo Líng
Southern Min
- Hokkien POJ: Siau Pó-lêng

Seow Poh Leng (1883–1942) one of the first few Peranakan Babas at Emerald Hill, was a prominent and successful Singaporean banker, founding member of the Ho Hong Bank, member of the committee of the Straits Settlement (Settlement of Singapore), philanthropist and benefactor of public development works. He was a strong advocate of limited liability trading and promoted the advantages of the Limited Liability Company system.

== Early life and education ==
Seow Poh Leng born in 1883 was the second son of Seow Chye Watt. Seow spent two years in a Chinese school and completed his schooling at the Anglo-Chinese School. After passing his Senior Cambridge examinations, he decided to become a teacher. He competed for the Queen's Scholarships in 1902. He failed to win the much-coveted prize, and attributed his failure to the fact that he had to divide his time between his duties as a pupil teacher and preparing for the examinations.

== Career ==
In order to help support his family, Seow took up additional work and sell nonya cakes and nasi lemak cooked by his mother and sisters.

Later, Seow moved on from teaching to become the manager of the Ho Hong Bank. He was also a cashier at John Little & Co for many years, before he entered the rice business. He had done stints as a chemist's assistant, schoolmaster, lawyer's clerk, stock-broker, insurance agent and company liquidator.

Seow was one of the promoters of the Eastern United Assurance Corporation Ltd. (EUA), Chinese Commercial Bank (CCB) and Ho Hong Bank (HHB). He founded HHB in January 1917 together with Lim Peng Siang, Lim Boon Keng and others, and served as its secretary and general manager. HHB was the first Straits Chinese institution to enter the field of worldwide banking and established connections with London, New York City, Hong Kong, Shanghai, Batavia and many others, in order to facilitate direct trade between the Chinese in Malaya and people in other parts of the world. Later, HHB was amalgamated with CCB and Oversea-Chinese Banking Corporation Ltd (OCBC).

== Public life ==
Seow was concerned with public welfare and engaged in many different roles and activities in this area. He suggested constructing a short connection road between Emerald Hill Road and Cairnhill Circle. He was also involved with the Singapore and South Malaya Boy Scouts Association since its inauguration, holding the position of secretary and treasurer, and did much to interest parents in the movement. Other activities included organising charity and social concerts and entertainment. His contributions to the Straits Chinese Magazine dealt with such subjects as education and social reform.

A love of theatre ran in the family. According to Sir Song Ong Siang, Seow took part in amateur theatricals in the 1930s. He was a lover of Shakespeare and named his seaside bungalow in Siglap "Titania" and his house on Emerald Hill Road, "Oberon." He was considered modern and loved artistic activities such as acting and singing, and served as the Hon. Secretary to the Straits Chinese Recreation Club in 1905.

Seow was a keen sportsman on the football field and in club sports, a tennis player and a chess player. He was one of the early members of Tanjong Katong Swimming Party, now the Chinese Swimming Club, where he once held the office of vice-president. During the early years of the volunteer movement, he served in its ranks.

In 1936 His Excellency The Governor appointed him to be a member of the Council of Raffles College.

In 1937 he was elected to membership of the Council of the King Edward VII College of Medicine.

Apart from The Hawker Bill, in which he played a major role, he was also associated with other subjects he believed to be of importance to the common man like championing pedal rickshaws and the abolition of water meter rents.

== Hawker Bill ==
Hawkers had been considered by some people to be a nuisance. In 1903, a bill was drafted by the Chinese Protectorate to provide licensing of hawkers and setting aside spaces where hawking was allowed. In 1905, Municipal Commissioners asked that the Municipal Ordinance be amended to provide them with the necessary powers to register hawkers and bring them under control, but this was refused by the Governor. The following year in 1906, by-laws of the Municipal Ordinance were created to help with regulation and control. There were numerous other activities through the years intended to regulate and control the number and activities of hawkers. The view among some people was that the evils of hawking were becoming more serious year on year.

In 1931, the Governor of Singapore appointed a committee "to investigate the hawker question in Singapore and to make recommendations as to any change in policy in this respect which may be considered advisable", consulting and taking evidence from the Municipal Health Officer, the police, Superintendent of Town Cleansing, Chinese Chamber of Commerce, Clerical Union, Teo Chew guilds, Indo-Ceylon Club and the Straits Chinese-British Association.

Seow championed the plight of hawkers who he felt were being treated callously and without any regard for the social benefits they were bringing, or for their own precarious economic situation. Through articles in the newspaper, including a self-composed poem, depositions and meetings with the committee. He sought to achieve a fair and balanced outcome that would take into consideration the needs of the masses who were not European, and who relied on the lower-priced food and non-food merchandise provided by the street hawkers of Singapore, exposing in the process the constant brutality hawkers faced from the authorities and bribery hawkers often had to resort to in order to continue to operate.

== Personal life ==
According to government archives, Seow was responsible for the development of a row of nine terrace houses along Cairnhill Road. The same records show that he owned bungalows in Emerald Hill Road and Lorong 20 Geylang Road, and had additions and alterations done to them. He bought 117 Emerald Hill in 1902.

Seow's family lived in a shop house along Emerald Hill Road opposite Lim Boon Keng, whom he had worked for on a part-time basis. Lim knew that Tan Soon Toh, the grandson of Tan Tock Seng, was looking for a husband for his daughter, Lilian Tan Luck Neo, and recommended Seow to the Tan family. Seow was married into the Tan family as was the practice at that time. Together, they had one son and two daughters. One of their daughters, Betty Seow Guat-Beng, married Lim Koon Teck, a barrister-at-law, industrialist and politician in the Malaya and Singapore.

In 1918, Tan was infected with influenza when the flu epidemic hit Singapore. Tan died of the flu in October 1918 at the age of 32. As Tan had indicated she like to be buried at Bidadari Cemetery, a Christian cemetery, which she found to be peaceful, Seow asked a pastor to baptise her before her death and buried her at Bidadari Cemetery. Lilian's mother later converted to Christianity.

Seow remarried a few years after Lilian's death. His new wife, Polly Tan Poh Li (daughter of Tan Boo Liat) was Lilian's niece. Lilian's mother thought it would not be a bad thing for Seow to marry her. They had a son and daughter.

== Seow Poh Leng medal ==
An alumnus of the Anglo-Chinese School, Seow instituted a medal in 1936 to be awarded to the top ACS boy at the Senior Cambridge/GCE "O" Level Examinations.
