= Kiong =

Kiong may be,

- Kiong language

== People ==
- Tan Wee Kiong
- Kiong Kong Tuan
- Liem Yoe Kiong
- Ling Sie Kiong
