= Kwong Yik Bank =

Colonial Singaporean bank (1903–1913)

Kwong Yik Banking Corporation Limited
- Native name: 新嘉坡廣益銀行
- Formerly: 廣益積聚銀號有限公司
- Type: Limited Company
- Industry: Banking
- Founded: 16 December 1903; 122 years ago in Singapore, Straits Settlements
- Founder: Wong Ah Fook
- Defunct: 18 December 1913
- Fate: Voluntary Liquidation
- Headquarters: 26 Kling Street, Singapore

The Kwong Yik Banking Corporation Limited, or simply the Kwong Yik Bank of Singapore (Chinese: 新嘉坡廣益銀行; pinyin: Xīnjiāpō guǎngyì yínháng) was the first local bank established in Singapore and British Malaya. The Kwong Yik Bank was founded in 1903 by Cantonese businessmen led by Wong Ah Fook, to provide personal banking services and arrange mortgages and loans to its predominantly Chinese clientele.

In 1913, the Kwong Yik Bank failed after experiencing a bank run. Liquidators of the bank exposed irregularities in record-keeping and financial malpractices in the daily management of the bank. In response, the Government of the Straits Settlements initiated lawsuits against the bank's directors and tightened regulatory control on banks and companies to protect the interests of depositors.

== Background ==
=== Chinese entry into finance ===
In the late 19th-Century, demand for banking services and credit to finance investments grew among the Chinese business community and society. In response to unfavourable lending conditions from western banks and Chettiar firms and increasing commercial competition with western businesses, Chinese businessmen sought to diversify into financial services, among other industries.

Currency reforms in the Straits Settlements, such as the introduction of the currency note issue in 1898, the introduction of the silver Straits Dollar pegged to the Gold Standard in 1903, and the Sterling Exchange Standard in 1906, also facilitated Chinese entry into financial services, benefiting from the improved monetary stability compared to the 19th-Century.

=== Existing Chinese financial institutions ===
Before the founding of the Kwong Yik Bank, the local Chinese in Malaya engaged in pawnbroking and remittance businesses. Pawnbrokers provided short-term credit secured against collateral, and was viewed as a better alternative to borrowing from Chettiar moneylenders. However, the relatively small amount of money available from pawnbrokers were not sufficient for financing large-scale commercial investments, and were often used for short term spending due to high interest rates.

Traditional Chinese remittance (Chinese: 僑批; pinyin: qiáopī) was another financial institution which facilitated remittance and postal services via networks of independent intermediaries. This system was unique to subsequent systems of international bank transfers and modern remittance systems. As the Kwong Yik Bank was the first local bank to utilise western banking practices, it would rely heavily on existing Chinese financial expertise and knowledge.

== History ==
=== Founding ===
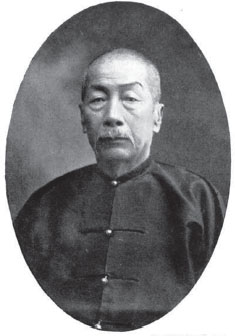
Wong Ah Fook, founding director and principal promoter of the Kwong Yik Bank

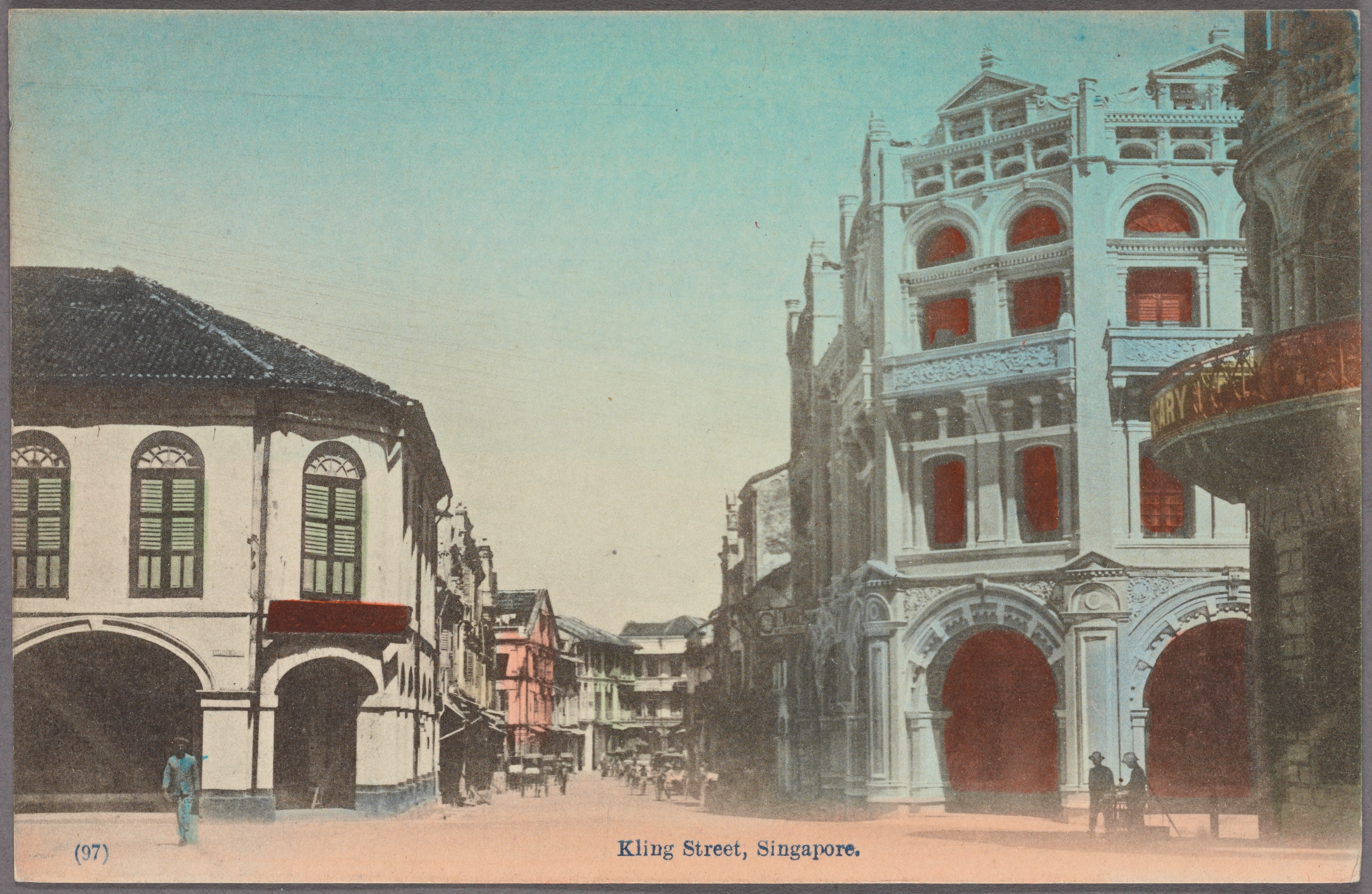
Kling Street, later renamed Chulia Street

Kwong Yik Bank was founded on 16 December 1903 by prominent Malayan Cantonese businessmen, with a paid-up capital of $850,000.

The Chinese characters of Kwong Yik (廣益) referred to both the "benefit of Cantonese people", referring to its Cantonese background, and "extensive profit", being an auspicious business name.

The bank operated from 26 Kling Street, and aimed to cater to a wider Chinese clientele, not limited to the Cantonese community.

Kwong Yik Bank was the first local bank established in Singapore and British Malaya and provided personal banking services and arrange mortgages and loans to its predominantly Chinese clientele. Its staff provided banking services to customers in Chinese and accepted checks written in Chinese, improving accessibility of banking and helped popularise the use of current accounts within Chinese society. Beyond the Chinese communities, the bank also served customers belonging to other ethnic groups, including the Malays and Chettiars, in an multicultural environment.

The role of businessmen was critical to the founding and operation of the bank as a Cantonese enterprise. Like the Sze Hai Tong and Chinese Commercial Banks that followed it, the Kwong Yik Bank drew its management from its connections within its affiliated business community along bang (帮, i.e., dialectal) lines. Among the Cantonese businessmen were construction magnate and gambier planter Wong Ah Fook, who was instrumental in financing, organising and promoting the bank. Despite his strong personal interest and association with the bank, he retained a lower-profile position of director after its founding and left management in the hands of the other promoters. Lam Wai Fong, the bank's first managing director, was also President of the Singapore Chinese Chamber of Commerce from 1909 to 1910. Most of the bank's founders were also involved in its promotion and management.

Similarly, the Kwong Yik Bank's managers derived their knowledge of banking from traditional Chinese operations in pawnbroking and remittance, which was reflected in the associated businesses of its promoters within the bank's management.

Notably, the full original name for the Kwong Yik Bank was literally the Kwong Yik "Savings Accumulation" Yinhao Limited Company (Chinese: 廣益積聚銀號有限公司). The term yinhao (Chinese: 銀號) referred to traditional forms of Chinese banking native to Guangdong and Hong Kong, rather than a western-style bank or yinhang (Chinese: 銀行). This may have reflected the different understanding of banking institutions by the bank's directors who may have been unfamiliar with western banking practices.

Initial promoters and officers of the Kwong Yik Bank
Name	Role	Associated businesses
Lam Wai Fong	Managing director	Pawnbroker
Wong Gai Seung	Deputy managing director	Comprador
Boey Lian Chin	Deputy managing director	Pawnbroker
Wong Mun Po	Manager	Pawnbroker
Wong Ming	Manager	Merchant
Wong Ah Fook	Director	Property owner
Choo Su Meng	Director	Merchant
Hui Kwik Sun	Director	Merchant
Yow Ngan Pan	Director	Merchant
Wong Kwong Yam	Director	Pawnbroker
Mui Bak Fook	Director	Pawnbroker

=== Collapse ===
On 20 November 1913, the Kwong Yik Bank ceased operations due to a bank run caused by rumours of the bank being unable to fulfil withdrawals. The bank announced plans to hold an internal audit and restructure its operations, and reassured that it had sufficient assets to meet its obligations. The suspension of operations caused a panic and the Singapore Chinese Chamber of Commerce (SCCC), which represented the different dialect bangs and their commercial interests, became involved in mediating the crisis, who scheduled a meeting for Kwong Yik's leaders before the SCCC and the bank's creditors on 6 December.

However, at the meeting, the auditor revealed he had discovered severe financial malpractice. Not only had the bank's managers issued unsecured loans to their fellow directors and associates, the bank's accounts were also never properly audited or balanced. These revelations soured public opinion against the bank. In the meantime, the bank's leadership were appealing to businessmen from the Kwong Yik (Selangor) Bank, a namesake bank founded in Selangor by Cantonese businessmen a few months prior to the crisis. However, the Kwong Yik Bank of Selangor did little to help its Singaporean counterpart regarding its liquidity crisis and distanced itself from its namesake. As the crisis worsened, the shareholders replaced Lam Wai Fong with Wong Ah Fook as managing director, who offered his fortune as security in settlement of the bank's debts.

Even so, the bank's leadership could not secure enough funds, and on 9 December, Kwong Yik's creditors and the representatives of the Chinese dialect bangs (including the Cantonese bangs) unanimously resolved to voluntarily liquidate the bank. A formal meeting of the shareholders on 18 December to pass the liquidation motions nominated Lim Peng Siang and Leow Chia Heng, President and Vice President of the SCCC, as liquidators to oversee the bank's liquidation. Both individuals also served as managing directors of the Chinese Commercial Bank, founded by Hokkien businessmen, and the Sze Hai Tong Bank, founded by Teochew businessmen, representing Singapore's two largest bangs in overseeing the liquidation. On 21 January 1914, a petition to the Supreme Court to forcibly liquidate the company under the Company Ordinance 1889 failed, however the court ordered the voluntary liquidation to proceed under court supervision, appointing chartered accountant W. Lowther Kemp as a third liquidator, formally appointed on 19 February 1914.

=== Aftermath ===
The rapid collapse of the Kwong Yik Bank shocked Chinese society, and the highly emotional affair caused much resentment towards the Cantonese within Chinese society.

Amongst Kwong Yik's managers and directors, several were convicted for their involvement in organising the erroneous advances, including Managing Director Boey Lian Chin and Director Lim Tian Siang.

As the bank's founder, director and largest shareholder, Wong Ah Fook badly damaged his reputation as a businessman and incurred much of the bank's debt, which he spent much of his remaining years clearing his portion of claims before his death in 1918.

The collapse also exposed the malpractice of the bank's Chinese managers, which resulted from their unfamiliarity with systems of transparency and reporting in western banking as well as a disregard for banking ethics. This gave managers the ability to finance unsecured loans to directors using public deposits, abusing the bank as a source of capital.

The government hastily modified the Companies Ordinance of 1889 shortly after Kwong Yik's demise with the Companies (Amendment) Ordinance of 1914, limiting advances and loans to directors and officers without collateral, mandating statements in English, and requiring half-yearly auditing of banks, in order to protect depositors' interests.

However, opposition by Western business and banking interests within the legislative council to the limiting of advances suggests this was likely a common practice at the time in both Chinese and European banks other than Kwong Yik. The legislative council would soon also pass the Companies Ordinance of 1915, which brought company law in the Straits Settlements much closer to English company law.

Overall, the collapse of the Kwong Yik Bank also highlighted to Chinese bankers the risks of improper banking practices and the necessity of standards in operating modern banks.

Additionally, the collapse also exposed the liquidity problems of smaller local Chinese banks, which did not enjoy the large access to capital that overseas Western banks enjoyed, necessitating a more conservative financial policy to preserve liquidity.

Thus, subsequent Chinese banks would adopt more organised and regulated framework for their banking operations to avoid similar mismanagement.

Following KYB's failure and company law reform, these banks also implemented new practices. They sought to separate their operations from the business interests of their directors in public. For example, the Ho Hong Bank, despite having a controlling shareholder, Lim Peng Siang, managing the Ho Hong conglomerate, declared itself to be ‘distinct and separate’ from other Ho Hong enterprises. The necessity of collateral for loans was institutionalised with proper procedures and record keeping in these early Chinese banks.

As for the local Cantonese businessmen, they would soon reorganise their banking interests, founding the Lee Wah Bank in 1920.

== See also ==
- Chinese Commercial Bank
- Wong Ah Fook
