= Tan Teck Neo =

Peranakan philanthropist and socialite (1877–1978)

Tan Teck Neo MBE
- 陈德娘
- Tan in One Hundred Years' History of the Chinese in Singapore (1923)
- Born: 18 December 1877
- Died: 27 February 1978 (aged 100); Singapore
- Resting place: Choa Chu Kang Christian Cemetery
- Known for: Founder of Chinese Women's Association
- Spouse: Lee Choon Guan (m. 1900–1924)
- Father: Tan Keong Saik

Tan Teck Neo MBE (18 December 1877 – 27 February 1978), also known as Mrs. Lee Choon Guan, was a Peranakan philanthropist and socialite.

== Early life ==
Tan was born on 18 December 1877 in Singapore, Straits Settlements. She was the third and youngest daughter of Peranakan Chinese businessman Tan Keong Saik. Along with her sisters, she was one of the few girls in Singapore to receive English education in the late 19th century, and from 1885, she was personally tutored by Sophia Blackmore, who would eventually found Methodist Girls' School.

== Life ==
In 1900, she married the widowed Peranakan businessman Lee Choon Guan, becoming his second wife. She had a daughter and a son by him.

In 1918, she was the first Chinese woman to be awarded a Membership of the Most Excellent Order of the British Empire, for her efforts in the first World War. In the second World War, she continued in aiding the British troops' welfare after escaping to Bangalore, India. She was also the first Chinese woman to drive in Singapore.

On 27 August 1924, her husband died and she did not remarry.

She was a popular socialite who would frequently host esteemed guests at her family residence, the Mandalay Villa, at 29 Amber Road, Katong. These guests have included important community leaders, like then Chief Justice Sir James William Murison, and Malayan royalty, including the Sultan and Sultana of Johore, at her birthday celebrations.

== Philanthropy ==
Tan was a supporter of women's causes in Singapore, with many of her contributions towards helping women and children, particularly young girls.

In 1937, she was appointed by then Governor of Singapore to the Committee of Ladies overseeing the Women and Girls Protection Ordinance.

In 2018, she was posthumously inducted into the Singapore Women's Hall of Fame for her 'philanthropy and pioneering community work efforts'.

=== Chinese Ladies' Association ===
In 1915, she set up and became the first president of the Chinese Ladies' Association, a group of 23 women from other prominent families in Singapore. It was the first charity in Singapore to specifically champion the social needs and self-enrichment of Chinese women, enabling women to meet, advise and teach younger girls. Outside of charity and advocacy, the association also assisted in the First World War, canvassing to raise $6000 for a fighter plane representing Malayan women for the British troops. In her role as president, she had strong ties with other charity establishments, funding and organising events for their beneficiaries.

=== Educational causes ===
Tan and her husband were both involved in improving access to education for the Chinese community. Tan set up an endowment fund for Singapore Chinese Girls' School, the first school set up by the Straits Chinese community for its girls. She was on the Board of Directors and would attend prize-giving ceremonies, where she would present the annual prizes of books and pens. The school continued to award scholarships in her name from the income of the fund. Tan was also the patron of Geylang Methodist Girls' School. At the Chinese Ladies' Association where she presided, they provided classes on domestic skills for women.

=== Medical causes ===
Tan was among the first to offer scholarships to train more Chinese midwives, who were scarce at the time in the 1900s, lowering the occurrence of maternal deaths in the community. She donated $5000 towards the building fund for St Andrew’s Mission Hospital, which then primarily served the poorest local women and children, being situated in Chinatown. In 1922, she was invited to lay the foundation stone at its opening. In 1952, she donated another $5400 to the hospital towards cots for the infants in memory of her husband. Tan was a volunteer with the British Red Cross.

=== Singapore Po Leung Kuk ===
Tan was a patron of Singapore Po Leung Kuk, initially an organisation that rescued victims of prostitution. It eventually became a home for vulnerable young women to be trained in domestic skills before their adulthood, when they would go out to work or marry. She funded their activities and would invite women and girls from the home to visit her Mandalay Villa home.

=== Mandalay Villa ===
Besides gatherings for family and friends, many of Tan's home parties were also to raise awareness and garner support for charities like the Children's Aid Society and Rotary International. Tan would invite women, girls and children from Po Leung Kuk, the various girls' homes, and social centres to visit the Mandalay Villa, letting them play on the beach her estate encompassed. As a 'leading member' of the YWCA Singapore, she hosted small functions for the association at her residence.

== Death ==
Tan contracted influenza in January 1978, and slipped into a coma on 26 February 1978. She did not regain consciousness and died at 4 p.m. on 27 February 1978.
