= Wee Bin =

Chinese businessman (died 1868)

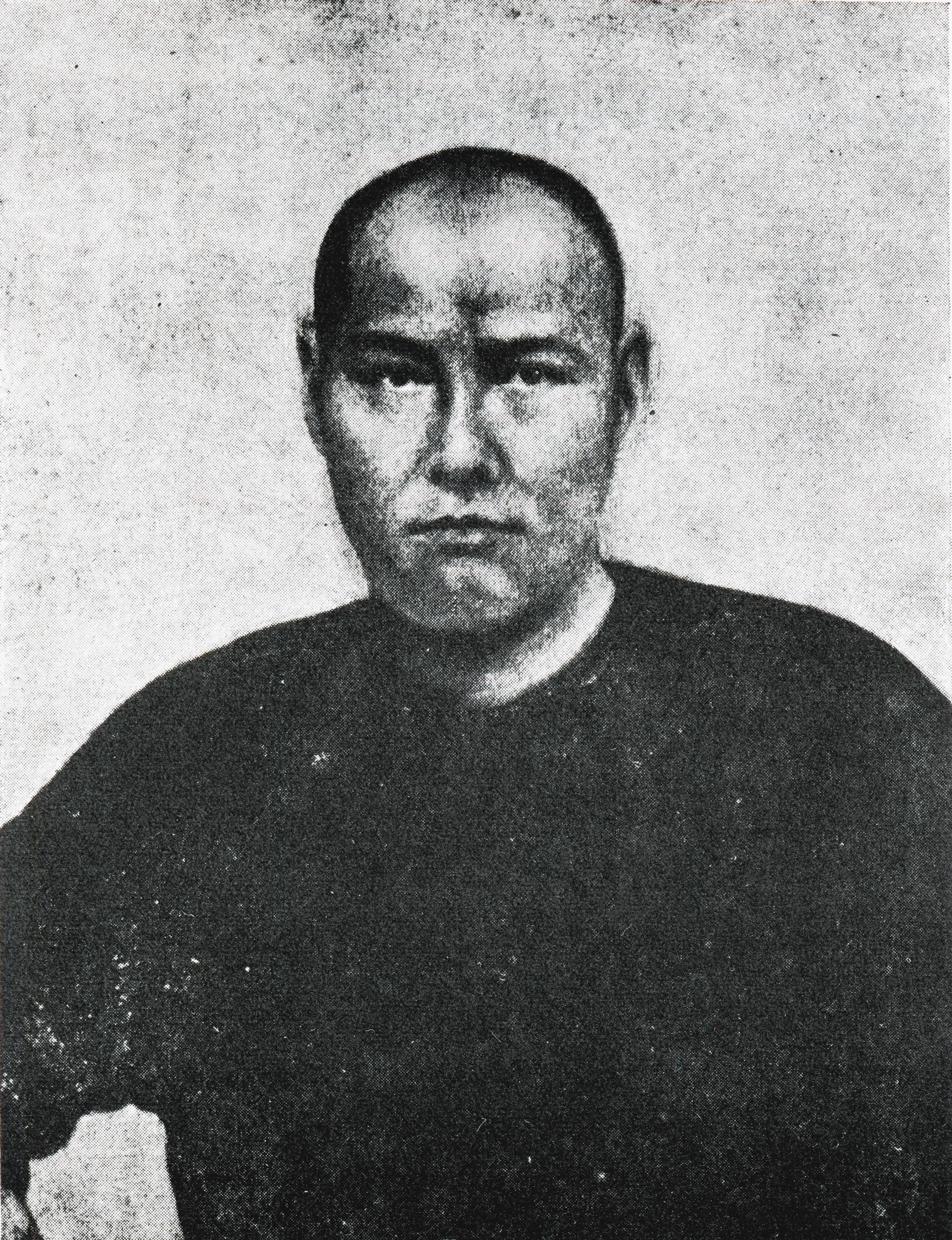
- Wee in One Hundred Years' History of the Chinese in Singapore (1923)
- Born: c. 1823; Fujian, (Qing dynasty) Qing empire
- Died: 1868 (aged 44–45)
- Occupations: Merchant, trader
- Known for: Founder of Wee Bin & Co.

Wee Bin (Chinese: 黃敏; pinyin: Huáng Mǐn; Pe̍h-ōe-jī: Ûiⁿ Bín) born in China in about 1823, was a Chinese migrant of the mid-nineteenth century who founded what was, at the time, Singapore's largest Chinese shipping firm.

== Career ==
At the age of thirty-three, Wee founded Wee Bin & Co., under the chop Hong Guan, in 1856. The firm was based in Market Street, and became prominent in the 1860s. Wee ran the firm according to Western business practices.

Wee, through his firm, carried on business as merchants and shipowners. At first, he began business relations with various trading houses in Bali (then part of the Dutch Indies), and eventually became the greatest importer of products from that port. Wee also traded in all kinds of earthenware, and later on built up a fleet of over twenty vessels for the Chinese and Dutch Indies trade.

With increasing interest in the tin mining industry and the need for more and more people to work the mines, Wee was also responsible for carrying migrant workers from China to work in the Straits Settlements.

== Personal life ==
Wee married the daughter of Kiong Kong Tuan. He died in 1868 at the age of 45, leaving a son, Wee Boon Teck, and a daughter.

Wee's daughter married Lim Ho Puah, who would later take over Wee Bin & Co., before passing it on to his fourth son Lim Peng Siang.
