= Chinese Commercial Bank =

Malayan bank established in Singapore

The Chinese Commercial Bank was a Malayan bank established in Singapore in 1912. It was also the first Hokkien bank in Singapore. In 1932, the bank was merged with Ho Hong Bank and Oversea-Chinese Bank to form the Oversea-Chinese Banking Corporation.

== History ==
=== Founding ===
The Chinese Commercial Bank was established 1912 by Lim Peng Siang and several merchants, including Lee Choon Guan and Lim Boon Keng.

On 17 August 1912, a largely attended meeting of Hokkiens, shareholders of the then proposed Chinese Commercial Bank Ltd., was held at the Chinese Chamber of Commerce in Hill Street, presided over by Lee Choon Guan. The assembled elected its first directors:

The meeting decided to register the company with a nominal (authorised) capital of $4 million. At that time the issued capital of $2 million had been over-subscribed. The temporary premises of the bank was at No. 61 Kling Street and Seow Poh Leng was pro. tem. Secretary. The bank commenced business at temporary premises at No. 31 Market Street on 2 December 1912, with Lim Choon Guan as Chairman, Lim Peng Siang as both Deputy Chairman and Managing Director, Seow Eng Tin as Manager and Seow Poh Leng continuing as pro. tem. Secretary. By this time the Board of Directors comprised, besides Choon Guan, Peng Siang, and Eng Tin, Tan Jiak Kim, Liao Chia Heng, Tan Chay Yan, Yeo Cheng Hai, Dr. Lim Boon Keng, Teo Soon Sian, Dr. S. C. Yin, Tau Siau Cheng, Seow Eng Tin, and Cheoh Cheng Kee.

The first year of the bank had, despite the commercial depression and many other difficulties, produced a profit of $84,742.03, $30,000 of which was moved to general reserve, $10,000 to reserve for bad and doubtful debts and $44,742.08 carried forward. At that time the value of the bank's property had appreciated and the bank was considering opening a branch at Penang.

In November 1913, following continual withdrawals for about a week amounting to up to $700,000, a notice was posted on the door of the Kwong Yik Banking Company's premises at Kling Street informing the public that there had been a run on the bank and the bank was unable to meet its liabilities at that time. The Chinese Commercial Bank's position, at the time, was considered to have been on sound footing.

To allay public fears, the Chinese Commercial Bank, in the form of a letter dated 16 December 1913 from Secretary Seow Poh Leng to the Editor of the Straits Times, wrote, "I notice a short paragraph in your issue of last Saturday to the effect that there has been a feeling of uneasiness in regard to the Chinese banks generally in Singapore and that in consequence many Chinese merchants have transferred their business from Chinese banks to European banks. I beg to state that these statements are not applicable to the Chinese Commercial Bank." Poh Leng went on to note that the Chinese Commercial Bank had, far from experiencing any loss of business, had improved its turnover - the turnover of business between 20 November 1913 when the uneasiness began and 13 December, exceeded the turnover of the same number of days previously, by 25% and correspondingly customers also increased by more than 26%.

In March 1914, Secretary Seow Poh Leng reported that a general meeting of shareholders of the Chinese Commercial Bank Limited had been held on 10 March 1914 at 64 Kling Street to elect new Directors. A poll was conducted and the 12 members with the highest votes were elected Directors - Lim Peng Siang (7,420), Lee Choon Guan (6,640), Lim Nee Soon (6,520), Lim Boon Keng (6,340), Seow Eng Tin (5,580), Tan Sian Cheng (5,340), Yeo Cheng Hai (5,160), Tan Chay Yan (4,640), Tan Jiak Kim (4,470), Tan Kah Kee (4,420), Gaw Khek Khean (4,390) and Lew Hong Sek (4,240). Lim Choon Guan was made Chairman, Dr. Lim Boon Keng made Vice Chairman and Lim Peng Siang was made Managing Director, with Yeoh Cheng Hai as Acting Managing Director in his absence, Seow Eng Tin as Manager and Seow Poh Leng as Secretary and Assistant Manager.

=== Bank run ===
in August 1914 there was a run on the Chinese Commercial Bank when $260,000 was drawn over the counter on Tuesday 4 August 1914. Dr. Lim Boon Keng arranged an interview with Sir Arthur Henderson Young (1854–1938), Governor of the Straits Settlements. Before the interview, Seow Poh Leng was called on to produce a balance sheet within 48 hours, which he did, after which he fell from sheer exhaustion. A notice, ordered by Sir Arthur, was published in the Staits Times of 7 August where the bank informed the public, "Owing to a run on the Chinese Commercial Bank, Limited, the directors have had to request the assistance of Government, and the latter has promised to help pending an examination into the accounts of the bank." By order of the Colonial Secretary, the bank was closed during the examination.

On 27 August 1914, Secretary Seow Poh Leng had a notice published in the major newspapers, informing the public of a Government proclamation, dated 26 August and published at the bank, "Maxwell, acting Colonial Secretary, Straits Settlements, issues this Proclamation for general information. The Government has examined thoroughly the accounts of the Chinese Commercial Bank and finds that its assets exceed the liabilities. The present trouble is partly due to the fact that many traders are hoarding their money instead of paying it into the bank. The Government now allows the shareholders of the bank to raise ready money; if no cash can be raised then they must make a call on the unpaid capital to meet this emergency. If the bank is able within a reasonable time to raise cash, the Government will certainly lend it a sum of money equal to the amount so raised. The bank is authorised to collect all debts due to it in the usual way. Further it should be well known to all that in the present time of war, people who have cash should pay it into the various banks in the Colony and thus allow it to circulate freely to help commerce and should not hoard it. Hoarding not only does no good to those who hoard but will certainly do harm to the local situation and thus help the enemy."

On 30 September 1914, the bank's statement of accounts, dated 15 August, was published by its auditors, Welsh & Co. On 30 September, Secretary Seow Poh Leng issued an announcement that the bank would resume business on Tuesday 1 October 1914. Within the first five minutes of the bank opening its doors there was more paid in than paid out and by noon deposits exceeded withdrawals by $27,552. Due to repeated complaints from shareholders, particularly Tan Cheng Siong, Lim Peng Siang, resigned.

The fourth annual report of the bank, in November 1916, noted a net profit of $199,105.80. Within 12 months, business volume had nearly doubled.

The net profit for the year ending 30 September 1917, amounted to $269,704.22. The bank had successfully recovered from the run, but due to complaints from shareholders, particularly Tan Cheng Siong, Lim Peng Siang resigned his position as Managing Director.

=== New bank building ===
In 1929, Chinese Commercial Bank and Oversea-Chinese Bank, built a jointly owned five-storey China Building.

== Merger ==
In 1932, the bank merged with Ho Hong Bank and Oversea-Chinese Bank to form the Oversea-Chinese Banking Corporation (OCBC).
