= Song Hoot Kiam =

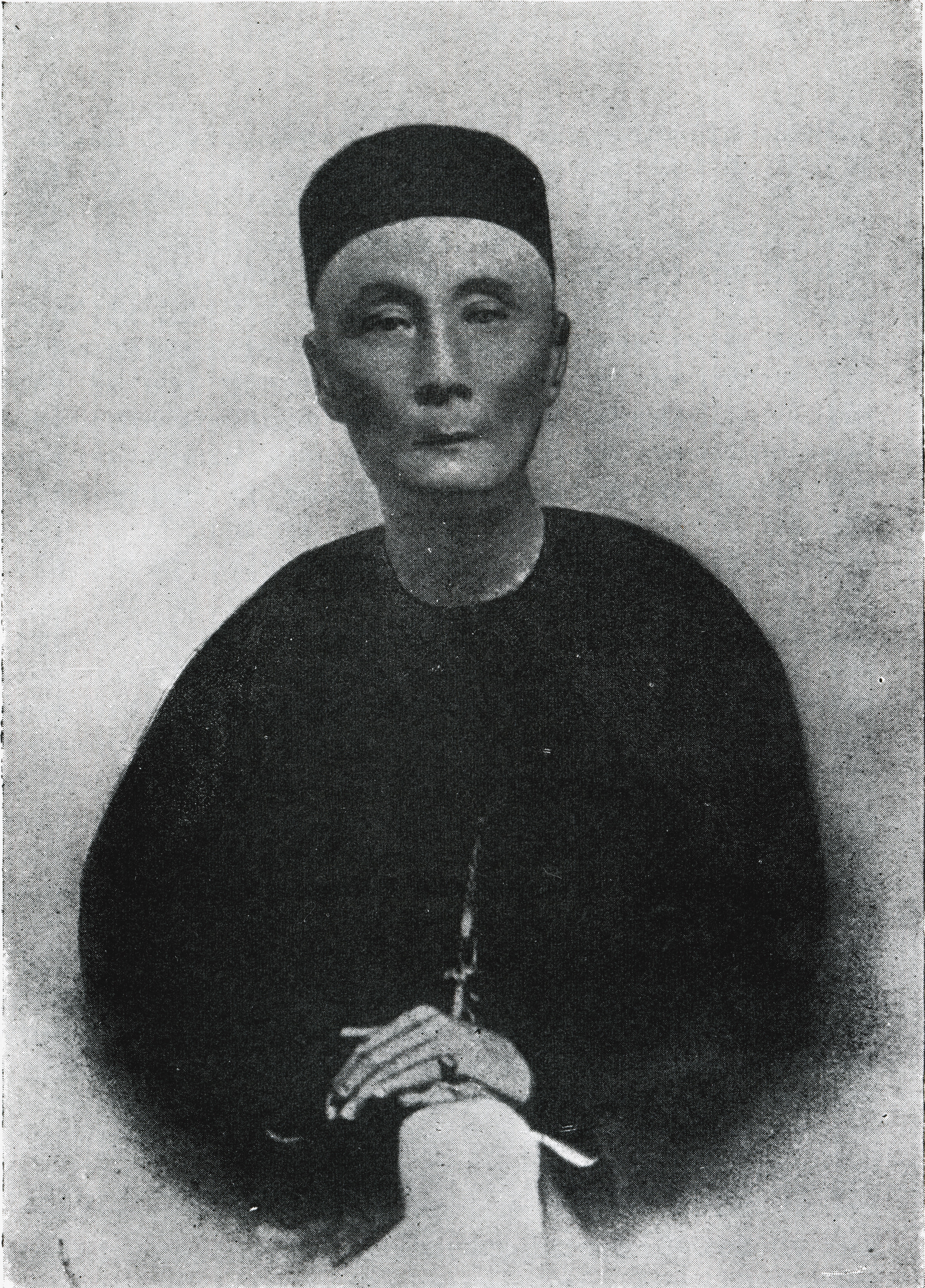
- Song in One Hundred Years' History of the Chinese in Singapore (1923)
- Born: 1830; Malacca, Straits Settlements, British Malaya
- Died: 7 November 1900 (aged 69–70); Singapore, Straits Settlements, British Malaya
- Children: 14, including Song Ong Siang

Chinese name
- Traditional Chinese: 宋佛儉
- Simplified Chinese: 宋佛俭
- Hanyu Pinyin: Sòng Fójiǎn
- Hokkien POJ: Sòng Hu̍t-khiǎm

Song Hoot Kiam (Chinese: 宋佛儉; 1830–1900) was a Singaporean community leader.

== Early life ==
Song was born 1830 in Malacca, British Malaya. His father was Song Eng Chong. He attended an English educational institution, after following Christian missionary James Legge to England, alongside two of his Malaysian peers. He also studied at Hong Kong's Anglo-Chinese College, taking up the Cantonese language as a subject. He was a choir member at the Strait Chinese Church.

== Career ==
After arriving back in Singapore, Song worked as a teacher for a short period of time, before working as a cashier for much of his lifetime, from 1853 to 1895. He is cited as having "founded the oldest family of Straits Chinese Christians in Singapore", as well as being the "first local Christian pioneer in Singapore".

== Personal life ==
Song had his first marriage some time after his return to Singapore, though not to the girl his parents had chosen for him, for she was not of Christian faith. His first spouse was Choon Neo (née Yeo), an alumna of the Chinese Girls' School. He later wed Phan Fung Lean, a Thai Chinese, following the death of Yeo. One of his children was author Song Ong Siang. Song had fourteen children and three marriages in total. He was a Christian, and could speak excellent English, and could also converse well in the Malay language (particularly his Baba Malay vernacular). A road was named after him in Singapore.

== Death and legacy ==
Song died in 1900, aged 70. The Straits Chinese Magazine wrote that Song "was a specimen of the best type of the Chinese character", describing him as a "mighty rock to his large family". Hoot Kiam Road, located near River Valley Road, is named after him.

== Bibliography ==
- Song, Ong Siang (1984). One hundred years' history of the Chinese in Singapore. Oxford University Press. ISBN 978-0-19582603-6.
