= Lee Cheng Yan =

Lee Cheng Yan (1841 — 18 May 1911) was a merchant, philanthropist, and leader of the Chinese community of Singapore.

== Early life ==
He was born in Malacca in 1841.

== Career ==
Lee came to Singapore in 1858 and established Lee Cheng Yan & Co.. The company, which was established on Telok Ayer Street, was initially a commission agency firm. He was soon joined by his brother Lee Cheng Gum, and the firm moved to Malacca Street. In 1883, he and Tay Geok Teat toured Europe and visited several manufacturing towns in England. During their visit to England, they were billed as the first two Straits-born Chinese to visit Great Britain for commercial purposes. In 1890, Lee and several other prominent businessmen, including Theodore Cornelius Bogaardt, Tan Jiak Kim and Tan Keong Saik, established the Straits Steamship Company.

In the 1890s, he handed over the leadership of Lee Cheng Yan & Co. to his son, Lee Choon Guan. He was later appointed a Hokkien representative of the Chinese Advisory Board, and made a justice of the peace. He founded the Hong Joo Chinese Free School and was a trustee of the Gan Eng Seng School. He was also a board member of the Toh Lam Chinese School and a member of the committees of the Tan Tock Seng Hospital and the Singapore Po Leung Kuk and a founding member of the Ee Hoe Hean Club. In 1906, he chaired a meeting of community leaders. It was decided during the meeting that ceremonies for the Hungry Ghosts Festival be abolished and public subscriptions for the Chingay parade would be cancelled on the grounds that the money used on the ceremonies would be better spent on education.

== Personal life and death ==
Lee owned four villas, the Magenta Cottage on Killiney Road, the Hampstead Bath in Upper Bukit Timah, the Mandalay Villa on Amber Road and a bungalow at Changi Point.

He died of a heart failure at the Magenta Cottage on 18 May 1911.
