= Kiong Kong Tuan =

Kiong Kong Tuan 龔光傳
- Born: 1790; Penang
- Died: January 16, 1854 (aged 63–64)
- Occupations: Merchant; revenue farmer
- Known for: Holder of opium and spirit farms in Singapore in 19th century

Kiong Kong Tuan (Chinese: 龔光傳; pinyin: Gōng Guāngchuán; Pe̍h-ōe-jī: Kíng Kong-thuân; 1790–1854) was a Chinese merchant from Penang. He was a merchant in Penang before establishing himself in Singapore. Kiong Kong Tuan held the revenue farms for opium in the 1830s, and also for spirits. He had a spirit factory at Pearl's Hill, and the site was known among the Chinese as Chiu-long-san ("Spirit Factory Hill"). He was known to have held the opium and spirit farms in 1848, and was the last opium farmer in Singapore. He was also involved in coffee and real estate. In the 1840s he had 50 acres (200,000 m^{2}) of coffee planted near Jurong. Kiong was the grantee of a large, 20 acres (81,000 m^{2}) tract of land, with Chin Swee Road as the main artery and Cornwall Street and Seok Wee Road as side streets, which was a densely populated Straits Chinese residential quarter.

Kiong married a daughter of Choa Chong Long, by whom he had an only son, Kiong Seok Wee, and several daughters, one of whom became the wife of Wee Bin of the steamship firm Wee Bin & Co. He died at the age of 64 on 16 January 1854. Kiong was of Hokkien ethnicity from southern Fujian region.

== See also ==
- The Singapore Encyclopedia
- A social history of the Chinese in Singapore and Malaya, 1800–1911, by Ch'ing-huang Yen ISBN 0-19-582666-3, ISBN 978-0-19-582666-1
- Guardian of the South Seas: Thian Hock Keng and Singapore Hokkien Huay Kuan, published by Singapore Hokkien Huay Kuan, 2006. ISBN 9789810559243
