= Tan Keong Saik =

Singaporean businessman

Tan Keong Saik JP
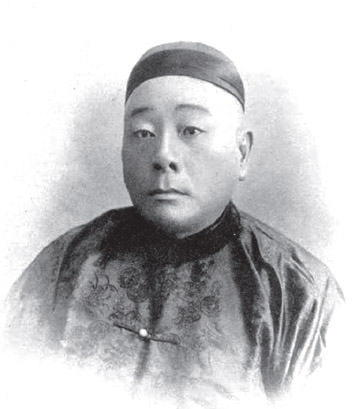
- Tan in One Hundred Years' History of the Chinese in Singapore (1923)
- Born: c. 1850; Malacca, Straits Settlements
- Died: September 29, 1909 (aged 58–59); Singapore, Straits Settlements
- Occupation: Businessman
- Father: Tan Chong Sean

Tan Keong Saik (simplified Chinese: 陈恭锡; traditional Chinese: 陳恭錫; pinyin: Chén Gōng Xī; Pe̍h-ōe-jī: Tân Kiong-sek) (c. 1850 – 1909) was a Singaporean businessman who contributed much to the social and intellectual life of the Chinese community at the turn of the 19th century. He was one of the men who contributed to the setting up of the Chinese Chamber of Commerce in 1906. An advocate of education and equality of rights for women, he was also one of the first members of the Po Leung Kuk, an association looking after the interest of teenage girls and women, in Singapore.

The son of Tan Choon Sian, he was born in Malacca in about 1850 and educated in Penang. After graduation, he came to Singapore to join Messrs Lim Kong Wan & Sons as a shipping clerk, and later as a storekeeper in a Borneo company. In his years working, he learnt the shipping trade, and went on to become a director of the Straits Steamship Co Ltd until his death in 1909.

== Death ==
The funeral was attended by many prominent local and Malayan businessmen, like Tan Jiak Kim and Seah Liang Seah. On 5 October 1909 at 10:30 a.m., the funeral procession began from his residence in Middle Road. With the coffin covered under an elaborate cover (known as kwantah), with a procession of Chinese banners and Chinese music jointly played by a Filipino brass and the Alhambra string bands at the rear. It made its away along Prinsep Street, Rochore Canal, Bukit Timah Road and finally laid to rest in the Tan family burial ground in Moulmein Road.

== See also ==
Sophia Blackmore
