= Ho Hong Bank =

Malaysian bank established in 1917

- Founded: 1917
- Defunct: 1932
- Successor: OCBC Bank

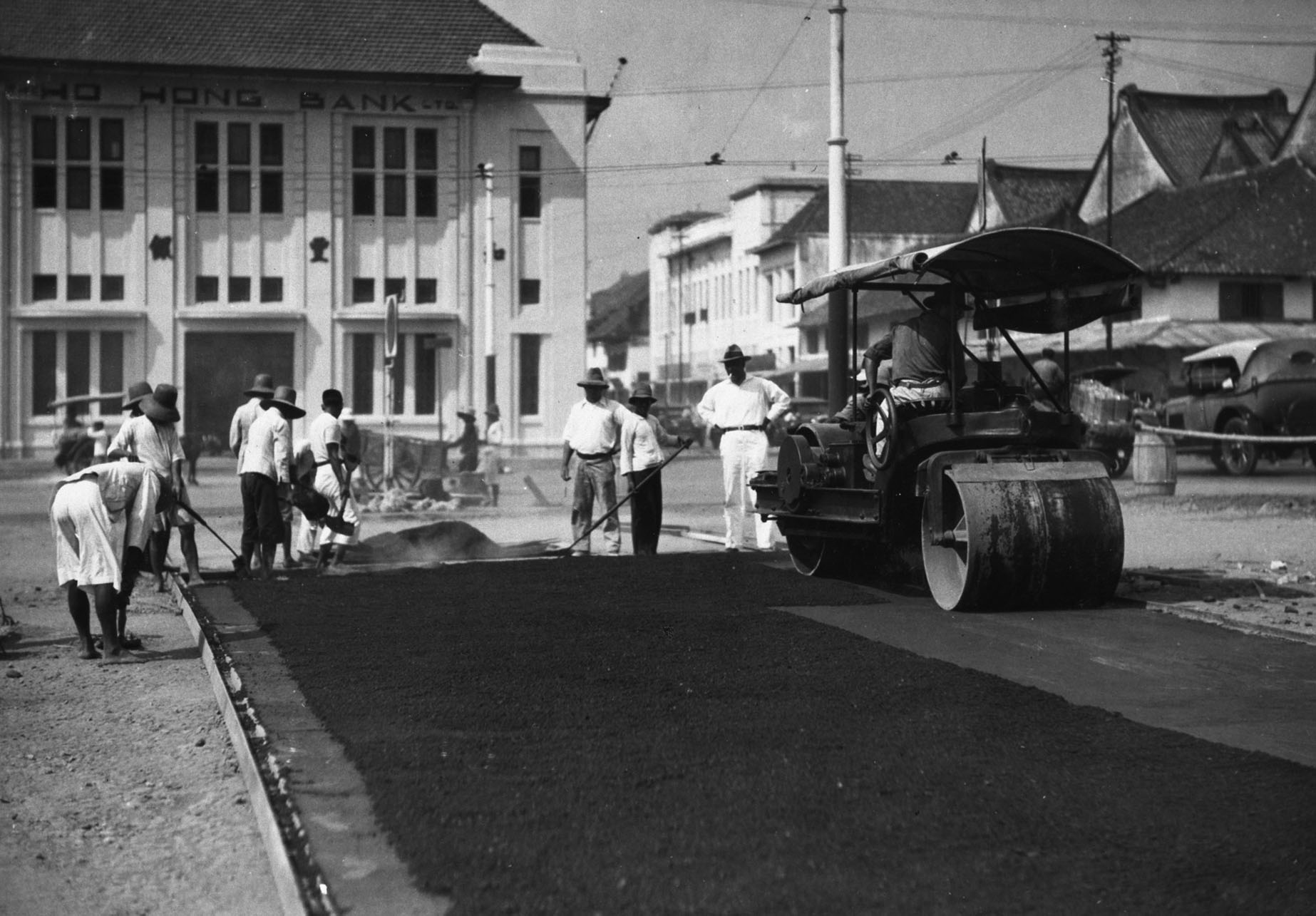
Branch of the Ho Hong Bank in Batavia, (1929).

The Ho Hong Bank (1917–1932) was a Malayan bank, established to provide banking services that, until 1912, were solely delivered by European banks. The bank was founded in 1917 and in 1932 merged with two other banks in Singapore to form the Oversea-Chinese Banking Corporation.

== Formation and Early History of the Ho Hong Bank ==
- On March 15, 1917, Lim Peng Siang registered the Ho Hong Bank. Advertisements in March 1917 informed the public of the establishment of the new bank, with its head office at Raffles Chambers 5 & 6 and branches at 155 First Cross Street in Malacca and 77/79 Jalan Suleiman in Muar. The bank was established with an authorised capital of $8 million and an issued capital of $4 million - $3.5 million (£40,406,976) was subscribed, half of which was paid up. This $3.5 million would grow to $4 million by 1920 and over $6 by 1931. The board of directors of the new bank comprised Lim Peng Siang as Chairman, Lim Boon Keng, Lee Choon Guan, Tan Cheng Kock, Chee Swee Cheng, Goh Soo Pin, Chan Kang Swi, Teo Soon Lan, Ng Ah Si, Lim Chwee Chian and Seow Poh Leng as General Manager and Secretary. Business commenced on 2 April 1917. Lim Peng Mau became Managing Director, Mah Kee Keng its Head of The Business Department, Tan Eng Hin its Manager of the Malacca Branch and Tan Chin Tah its Sub Manager of the Muar Branch. A final vindication of Lim Peng Siang could be seen in the $100,000 invested by the Chinese Commercial Bank in the Ho Hong Bank by the end of September 1917.
- On 1 July 1917 a branch was opened at Batu Pahat, the Ho Siang Bank there having been acquired for that purpose.
- From the start of January 1918, current accounts were opened at its head office in Singapore.
- The Ho Hong Bank held its first annual general meeting on Saturday 16 March 1918, and a net profit of $57,574.94 was announced. The company announced an issuance of further capital for branch extension, the next of which would be in Penang.
- Business in Penang commenced in May 1918, at 85 Beach Street. Following that an agency in Siamese territory at Trang and another in Palembang, Sumatra (Indonesia) were established and by March 1919, arrangements had been made to establish further agencies in the Federated Malay States, Hong Kong, Shanghai and Amoy (China).
- In May 1919, with the approval of the Board of Directors, the Ho Hong Bank undertook the duties of executors and trustees.
- By the end of May 1919, agencies had also been established at London, New York, San Francisco and Semarang (Indonesia) and the bank's paid up capital had been increased to $3 million. It was also, at that time, the first Chinese bank to have that many branches and agencies and it was the only bank in Singapore to undertake the offices of executors and trustees.
- By October 1919 the bank had agencies in Batavia and Surabaya (Indonesia).
- In September 1920, in order to pave the way for future expansion, the authorised capital of the Ho Hong Bank was raised from $8 million to $20 million through the issue of 120,000 additional shares of $100 each.
- At the end of March 1921 the Ho Hong Bank removed from Raffles Chambers 4, 5 and 6 to 94 Market Street and were thus able to, as other banks had a practice of doing, provide board and lodging to clerks. Up till then, because of this lack, the bank had found it difficult to engage clerks.
- In May 1922 the Ho Hong Bank disposed by auction, various properties it had previously bought in Johore: Eng Teck San rubber and tapioca estate (985 acres) in Johore grant 2363 ($34,000); land and houses Nos 5 and 6 Jalan Mersing, Kluang, (2660 sq. ft.) in Johore grant 2787 ($5,000); land and house No. 7 Jalan Mersing, Kluang, (2660 sq. ft.) in Johore grant 2787 ($5,000); land and houses Nos 8 and 9 Jalan Mersing, Kluang, (1770 and 1790 sq. ft.) in Johore grants 2788 and 2789 ($3,700 each); land and houses Nos 10, 11 and 12 Jalan Mersing, Kluang, (1764, 1768 and 2295 sq. ft.) in Johore grants 2790, 2791 and 2792 ($3,500 each); Gowthia Rubber Estate, Pasir Gudang, Johore (978 acres) and 3 roads ($34,000).
- On 1 October 1923, the bank, which already had an agency in Hong Kong, formally opened a branch office there, in the Astor house building at the premises formerly occupied by the Bank of Asia.
- In July 1924 the bank bought No 1 Cairnhill Circle (50,804 sq. ft.) from Estate and Trust Agencies Ltd. for $35,000.
- On 30 January 1926 a branch was opened at Birch Road in Seremban.
- By April 1926, encouraged by the success of the Hong Kong and Seremban branches, plans were afoot to establish branches in Batavia and Shanghai, and to acquire its own premises for the Muar and Malacca branches.
- By the time of its tenth annual general meeting on 3 May 1927, Ho Hong Bank had established branches in Batavia and Shanghai. The bank now had nine (9) branches and had set their sights on opening a branch in Surabaya (Indonesia), but that was postponed and by 1928 premises for that branch had been acquired.
- Ho Hong Bank was appointed receiving agents for the sale of the Rehabilitation Short Term Bonds of the Ministry of Finance of the Nationalist Government of China in August 1928.

== First Malayan Chinese bank to go international ==
Seow Poh Leng focused his efforts towards bringing the Ho Hong Bank in line with the well-established "exchange banks" of the Straits Settlements and relying solely on his own study and observation cautiously began foreign exchange activities. He was joined in his efforts, in 1923, by Dr. H. L. Huang who had existing practical exchange experience.

The Ho Hong Bank was the first Chinese bank in Malaya to engage in international banking. Ho Hong Bank enhanced its foreign exchange business by establishing branches in Hong Kong and later Shanghai. This, together with close co-operation of the South East Asian (Nanyang) offices and correspondents, transformed this local bank into an important exchange bank in Shanghai, Hong Kong and Malaya.

== The Ho Hong Foreign Exchange Training Program ==
The opening of the Shanghai office offered opportunities to send Bank staff there to experience modern exchange operations, a far-sighted policy, the brainchild of Lim Peng Siang and Seow Poh Leng. Among those sent over to learn under the program implemented by Ko Leong Hoe and Dr. H. L. Huang, included bankers like Chua Keh Hai (Chinese: 蔡克諧; pinyin: Cài Kèxié), Kwa Siew Tee (Chinese: 柯守智; pinyin: Kē Shǒuzhì), Tan Chwee Lee (Chinese: 陳水鯉; pinyin: Chén Shuǐlǐ), Tan Ee Leong (Chinese: 陳維龍; pinyin: Chén Wéilóng) and Yeo Tiam Siew (Chinese: 楊添壽; pinyin: Yáng Tiānshòu).

== Merger ==
Difficulties brought on by the Great Depression forced the Ho Hong Bank to merge in 1932 with the Oversea-Chinese Bank (OCB) and the Chinese Commercial Bank (CCB) to form the Oversea-Chinese Banking Corporation (OCBC).

== Timeline ==
- 1917: Lim Peng Siang founded the Ho Hong Bank Limited, opening branches simultaneously in Singapore, and Muar and Malacca in what is now Malaysia. It then opened branches in Ipoh, Kuala Lumpur, Batu Pahat and Penang. Ho Hong rapidly opened branches in Batavia and Palembang in the Dutch East Indies.
- 1923: Branch opened in Hong Kong.
- 1925: Branch opened in Shanghai.
- 1930: CCB, Ho Hong and OCB agree a mutual support pact.
- 1932: The United Kingdom leaves the gold standard and devalues the pound sterling. This leaves Ho Hong and OCB in financial trouble and they approach CCB for help. OCBC is born as the result of the merger of Chinese Commercial, Ho Hong and OCB. Ho Hong and OCB branches in Malaya are converted to OCBC Bank branches.
- 1933: OCBC starts functioning on 2 January 1933. OCBC emerges as the biggest and strongest bank in the Straits Settlements. The Ho Hong and OCB branches in Malaya eventually become OCBC Bank (Malaysia) Bhd.
