= Choa Chong Long =

Chinese magnate, revenue farmer and colonist

- 蔡滄浪

1st Kapitan Cina of Singapore
- Preceded by: Position established
- Succeeded by: Tan Tock Seng (acting)

Personal details
- Born: 14 March 1788 Dutch Malacca
- Died: 1838 Macau
- Relations: Kiong Kong Tuan (son-in-law)
- Parent: Kapitan Choa Su Cheong (father)
- Occupation: Revenue farmer; plantation owner

Choa Chong Long (Chinese: 蔡滄浪; Pe̍h-ōe-jī: Chhòa Chhong-lōng; 1788-1838) was a Chinese prominent magnate, revenue farmer and pioneering colonist who served as the first Kapitan Cina of Singapore under the British colonial government.

He was the son of Choa Su Cheong, who was the Kapitein der Chinezen of Malacca in the Dutch colonial period. The younger Choa ventured out to Singapore when the British took over the island, but unlike most Chinese and Malay immigrants, Choa Chong Long was already a rich man. He was appointed Kapitan Cina of Singapore by Sir Stamford Raffles, who took control of the island for the British. He held the revenue farm for the import and sale of opium. He was also thought to be one of the first Chinese to manage a plantation in Singapore.

Choa celebrated his forty-fourth birthday by giving a grand dinner to which all influential residents of the island, including many Europeans, were invited. Choa's daughter married Kiong Kong Tuan, who was also a revenue farmer and businessman

Choa died in Macau in 1838, leaving a will containing "a devise for ever of certain properties for sinchew (ancestral worship) purposes which was eventually declared void.

== See also ==
- Holding the Fort: Melaka Under Two Flags, 1795-1845 by Brian Harrison - Malacca (Malacca) - 1985 - Page 145
1. Chinese leadership and power in colonial Singapore by Ching Fatt Yong; Published by Times Academic Press, 1992, ISBN 981-210-028-8, ISBN 978-981-210-028-3
2. Physical adjustments in a changing landscape: the Singapore story By Avijit Gupta, John Pitts published by Singapore University Press, National University of Singapore, 1992 ISBN 9971-69-172-8, ISBN 978-9971-69-172-1
3. Stories of early Singapore By Harold Frank Pearson, University of London Press, 1954
4. Singapore civil society and British power By E. Kay Gillis ISBN 981-05-2694-6, ISBN 978-981-05-2694-8
5. Entrepreneurs and institutions in Europe and Asia, 1500-2000 By Ferry de Goey, Jan Willem Veluwenkamp ISBN 90-5260-032-5, ISBN 978-90-5260-032-1
6. 新社學報, Volumes 1-3 published by 新社, 1967
