= Wong Ah Fook =

Chinese-Malaysian businessman (born 1837)

Wong Ah Fook JP, S.M.J.
- 黃亞福
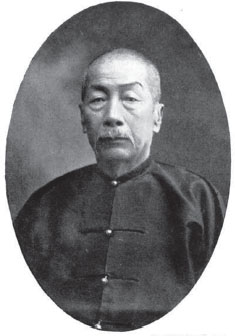
- Born: 12 March 1837; Yanjingcun (眼镜村), Taishan, Guangdong, Qing empire
- Died: 12 September 1918 (aged 81); Singapore, Straits Settlements
- Resting place: Kwong Wai Siew Peck San Theng, Singapore, Straits Settlements
- Occupation: Businessman
- Spouse: 1. Chew Yew; 2. Mdm Pang
- Children: 1. Wong Siew Nam; 2. Wong Bee Keng; 3. Wong Bee Ho; 4. Wong Bee Soo; 5. Wong Siew Kuan; 6. Wong Bee Woon; 7. Wong Siew Chan; 8. Wong Siew Qui; 9. Wong Siew Yuen

Chinese name
- Traditional Chinese: 黃亞福
- Simplified Chinese: 黄亚福
Transcriptions
Standard Mandarin
- Hanyu Pinyin: Huáng Yàfú
Yue: Cantonese
- Jyutping: wong4 ngaa3 fuk1

Wong Ah Fook J.P., S.M.J. (Chinese: 黃亞福; 12 March 1837 – 12 September 1918), also known as Wong Fook (黄福) or Wong Fook Kee (黄福基), was a Chinese immigrant, entrepreneur, and philanthropist who left an indelible imprint on the state of Johor in present-day Malaysia, particularly its capital, Johor Bahru. Primarily a building contractor, although he also ventured into many other businesses, he built a good number of Johor's heritage buildings, including the original Istana Besar, the royal palace of the Sultan of Johor. Jalan Wong Ah Fook, one of the busiest streets in downtown Johor Bahru, is named after him.

== Early life ==
Born in Yanjingcun, a Chinese village in Taishan county, Guangdong province, Wong Ah Fook hired himself out as a farmer's boy when his family fell on hard times. It is likely that he never attended school but he did learn to read and write and also to use the abacus. In 1854, then age 17, Wong emigrated to Singapore as the result of civil unrest in his hometown that eventually erupted into the Punti–Hakka Clan Wars (1855–1867). Like many others, he had no money to pay his passage and indentured himself to a carpenter as he did not want to travel all the way, only to become an agricultural laborer all over again. After working for a year at nominal wages, Wong was free but he continued to work with his employer and was given a share of the business after a few years.

== The beginnings of success ==
The Singapore economy was growing and there was a great demand for houses, shops, and warehouses. Seeing the opportunities, Wong became a building contractor as it was only a short step from carpentry work. Obtaining the patronage of Hoo Ah Kay (better known as Whampoa), a fellow Cantonese, he was able to secure a major contract in 1863 to build two godowns for Paterson & Simons (acting as the business agent for the Temenggungs of Johor in Singapore), some ten years after his arrival in Singapore. It was Hoo who introduced Wong to his wide circle of friends, including Maharaja Abu Bakar who subsequently became the Sultan of Johor. Hoo was a successful businessman who had built up a prosperous ships' chandlering business and was the supplier and contractor to Her Majesty's navy.

In the year of 1904, Sultan Abu Bakar honoured him with SMJ in recognition of his services to the Johor.

== Later life ==
Beginning with the construction of the Istana Besar in 1865 that made him become the main government contractor, Wong Ah Fook was drawn into the politics of Johor's gambier and pepper economy at about this time when he was asked by the Johor government to penetrate the Kongkek (the Gambier and Pepper Society of Singapore) which was then monopolizing the industry. This introduced him into revenue farming after he was granted a lease on the tax on all the two crops produced in Johor and its territories, and it was revenue farming that brought him great wealth. Wong also helped with the construction the Istana Tyersall in 1890 for the Sultan's residence in Singapore.

In 1892, Wong was granted a 99-year lease for 10 lots of land by the Sultan on the east bank of Sungai Segget as a reward for his services. Named Kampung Wong Ah Fook, the main road in the kampung was named Jalan Wong Ah Fook, while three other smaller roads, namely Jalan Siu Nam, Jalan Siu Koon, and Jalan Siu Chin, were named after Wong's three eldest sons. The area became a p Cantonese-dominant area and is now the city centre of Johor Bahru, with all the four roads still existing till date. However, it was the Kwong Yik Bank that was to become Wong Ah Fook's most ambitious undertaking and achievement. The venture became a disaster.

On 26 December 1914, a general meeting of Chinese Community of Johor Bahru was held for the elections of the officials and discussing the particulars of Chinese General Mandarin School of Johor, Khuan Jiew School, Wong Ah Fook was elected as the President of the committee.

He also one of the original founders of the Kwong Wai Siew Chinese Hospital (now Kwong Wai Shiu Hospital; Chinese: 广惠肇留医院; lit. 'Guang-Hui-Zhao "overnight" hospital') in Singapore, which according to The Straits Times, "a hospital providing indigenous treatment to the Chinese".

== Illness and death ==
In the later part of his life, Wong had suffered from a failing eyesight, and two months before his passing, he had recovered from a severe illness. However, in August 1918, he contracted influenza which developed into pneumonia, to which he succumbed. On 12 September 1918, Wong Ah Fook died at the age of 82 in his home at 80 Kampong Java Road, in the present day district of Kallang, Singapore. He was buried at Kwong Wai Siew Peck San Theng after his death.

== Honour ==
- Johor :
  - Companion of the Order of the Crown of Johor (Seri Mahkota Johor - SMJ) - 1904

== Bibliography ==
- Oral History in Southeast Asia: Theory and Method: Biography of Wong Fook Kee. P. Lim Pui Huen. 1998
- 黄亚福逸事
- 南洋淘金梦
