= Tay Geok Teat =

- 郑玉瓞(哲)
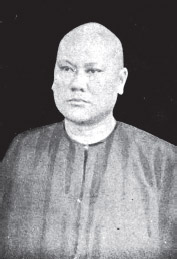
- Born: 1832; Malacca, Straits Settlements
- Died: April 21, 1893 (aged 60–61); Amoy Street, Singapore, Straits Settlements
- Occupation: Merchant
- Father: Tay Song Quee

Tay Geok Teat (1832 - 21 April 1893) was a prominent Chinese merchant who was a founder the firm Geok Teat & Co., and was briefly a member of the Municipal Commission of Singapore.

== Biography ==
Tay was born in Malacca in 1832 to Tay Song Quee, a trader from Zhangzhou, China. Tay moved to Singapore when he was young and briefly became a member of the Municipal Commission, although he resigned after the death of his wife. In 1863, the firm Warehousemen and Commission Agents, which later became Geok Teat & Co. was founded by Tay, Tan Kim Tian, Tan Sam Chie and Chia Ann Siang. His son, Tay Kim Tee, was introduced into the business in 1871. In 1885, he and Lee Cheng Yan toured several countries in Europe, including England. During their visit to England, they were billed as the first two Straits-born Chinese to visit Great Britain for commercial purposes. After his return to Singapore from Europe, he formed a band with his grandchildren, and would occasionally join in by playing the violin, which he was fond of. Somewhere around 1888, Tay travelled extensively in China and visited Japan.

== Death and legacy ==
Tay died on 21 April 1893 at his residence on Amoy Street. Following his death, his son took over his business. After his death, Geok Teat Street was named after Tay. The street is now defunct
