= Philip Tower =

British Army general (1917–2006)

Major-General Philip Tower CB DSO MBE
- Born: 1 March 1917; Rhu, Dunbartonshire
- Died: 8 December 2006 (aged 89); Tisbury, Wiltshire
- Relatives: Vice Admiral Sir Thomas Tower (father); Rear Admiral Ion Tower (uncle)
- Military career
- Allegiance: United Kingdom
- Branch: British Army
- Service years: 1937–1972
- Rank: Major-General
- Service number: 71007
- Unit: Royal Artillery
- Commands: Royal Military Academy Sandhurst (1968–1972); Middle East Land Forces (1967); 12th Infantry Brigade Group (1962–1964); 51st Infantry Brigade Group (1961–1962); 3rd Regiment Royal Horse Artillery (1957–1960); J (Sidi Rezegh) Battery Royal Horse Artillery (1954–1955)
- Conflicts: Second World War; Aden Emergency
- Awards: Companion of the Order of the Bath; Distinguished Service Order; Member of the Order of the British Empire; Mentioned in Despatches (2)

Major-General Philip Thomas Tower, CB, DSO, MBE (1 March 1917 – 8 December 2006) was a British Army officer who held high command in the late 1960s.

== Military career ==
The only son of Vice Admiral Sir Thomas Tower, Tower was born in Rhu, Dunbartonshire. Educated at Harrow and the Royal Military Academy, Woolwich, he was commissioned into the Royal Artillery in 1937, then served with the 25th Field Regiment in India until the outbreak of the Second World War.

Ordered to North Africa, Tower saw active service against the Italians in 1940 and 1941 and was at the Battle of Bir Hakeim in May 1942. When General Neil Ritchie abandoned the Gazala Line, the garrison at Tobruk was left isolated, and Tower's force fought until their ammunition was exhausted, at which point they surrendered. He was awarded the Distinguished Service Order for his part in this action, and was appointed a Member of the Order of the British Empire in 1942 for his earlier service in the Middle East. Tower was interned in a prisoner-of-war camp in Italy until the Italians surrendered in September 1943. He then escaped and crossed through the German lines reaching safety in one month later. He was appointed brigade major of the 1st Airborne Division in April 1944. Later that year, during the Battle of Arnhem, part of Operation Market Garden, he parachuted and was safely evacuated. Tower accompanied 1st Airlanding Light Regiment in the relief of Norway in Spring 1945.

He graduated from the Staff College, Camberley in 1948, the Joint Service Defence College in 1956 and the Imperial Defence College in 1961.

In 1967, he was appointed a Companion of the Order of the Bath, and was Commandant of the Royal Military Academy Sandhurst. In May of the same year, he became General Officer Commanding Middle East Land Forces where he served in the Aden Emergency. Retired from the army in 1972, he was Administrator of Blickling Hall in Norfolk from 1973 to 1982. Between 1975 and 1978, he was County commissioner for the Norfolk St John Ambulance Brigade.

Tower was married to Elizabeth Sneyd-Kynnersley; they were childless.

Military offices
Preceded by Peter Hunt	Commandant of the Royal Military Academy Sandhurst; 1968−1972	Succeeded by Jack Harman
