= Wee Boon Teck =

Singaporean businessman (1850–1888)

Wee Boon Teck 黃文德
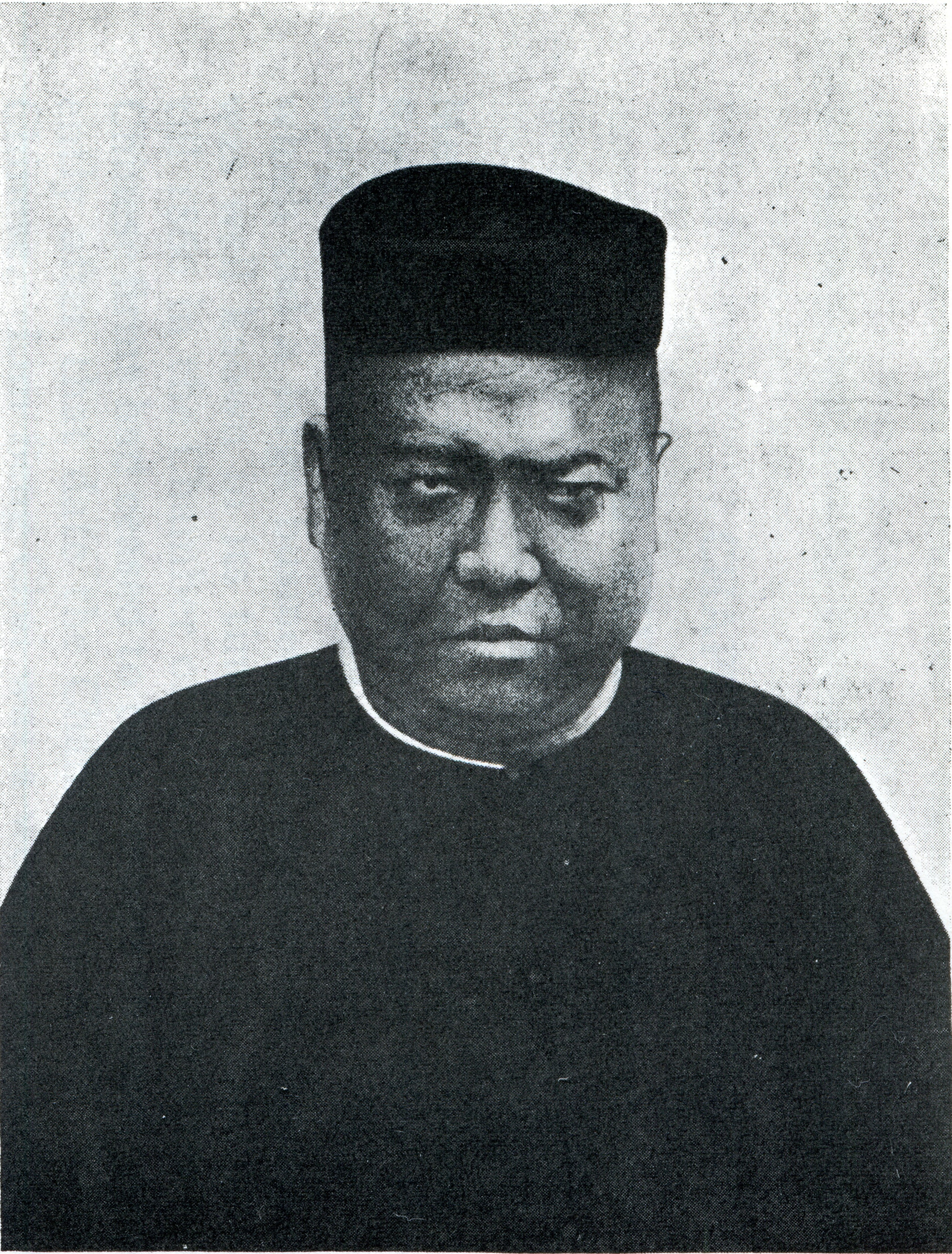
- Wee in One Hundred Years' History of the Chinese in Singapore (1923)
- Born: 1850
- Died: 22 September 1888 (aged 37–38)
- Occupation: Merchant
- Known for: Donor to Tan Tock Seng Hospital; namesake of Boon Teck Road in Singapore

Wee Boon Teck (Chinese: 黃文德; pinyin: Huáng Wéndé; Pe̍h-ōe-jī: Ûiⁿ Bûn-tek; 1850–1888) was the only son of Wee Bin and was the latter's successor at the firm of Wee Bin & Co., where he improved and strengthened the position of the firm. He served on the committees of Tan Tock Seng Hospital and Po Leung Kuk. He donated $4,000 to the Tan Tock Seng Hospital, which was invested by Government for about twenty years and which was then applied towards the cost of building a ward bearing his name in the hospital at Moulmein Road. He was described as having a kindly and charitable disposition. Wee Boon Teck died on 22 September 1888 at the age of 38. Boon Teck Road is named after him.
