= Lim Ho Puah =

Chinese businessman (1841–1914)

Lim Ho Puah JP
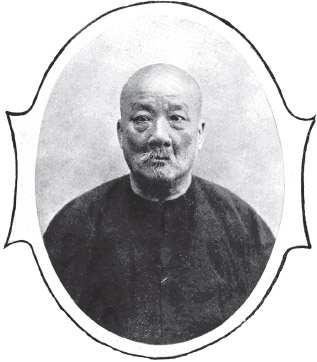
- Lim in One Hundred Years' History of the Chinese in Singapore (1923)
- Born: 30 December 1841; Amoy, Qing dynasty
- Died: 11 February 1914 (aged 72); Singapore, Straits Settlements

Lim Ho Puah (simplified Chinese: 林和坂; traditional Chinese: 林和阪; pinyin: Lín Hébǎn; Pe̍h-ōe-jī: Lîm Hô-póaⁿ) was a Hokkien merchant who was born in Amoy on 30 December 1841, and came to Singapore at an early age. He was employed by Wee Bin & Co., where his abilities were noticed by his employer, Wee Bin. He later married Wee Bin's daughter. He was the founder and senior partner of the Wee Bin Steamship Line and other concerns.

Lim became the sole surviving partner in the firm of Wee Bin & Co. when Wee Bin's grandson Wee Siang Tat (Chinese: 黃祥達; pinyin: Huáng Xiáng Dá; Pe̍h-ōe-jī: Ûiⁿ Siâng-ta̍t) died. The company was liquidated in 1911, when the greater part of the firm's business, including all the large steamships, was taken over by his son Lim Peng Siang (Chinese: 林秉祥; pinyin: Lín Bǐng Xiáng; Pe̍h-ōe-jī: Lîm Péng-siông).

Lim was a Director of Tan Kim Ching's Tanjong Pagar Dock Company, served as a member of the Chinese Advisory Board and on the Committee of the Po Leung Kuk, and was made a Justice of the Peace. He died on 11 February 1914 at the age of 74. His remains were interred in China.
