= HMS Foxglove =

Minesweeper of the Royal Navy

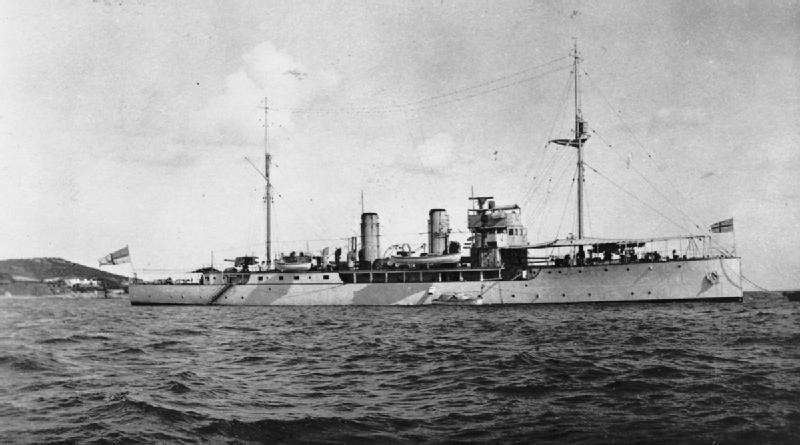
- HMS Foxglove during World War I

History

United Kingdom
- Name: HMS Foxglove
- Namesake: The foxglove
- Builder: Barclay Curle, Glasgow, Scotland
- Launched: 30 March 1915
- Commissioned: 1915
- Fate: Sold for scrapping 7 September 1946

General characteristics
- Type: Acacia-class minesweeping sloop
- Displacement: 1,200 tons
- Length: 250 ft (76 m) p/p; 262 ft 6 in (80.01 m) o/a
- Beam: 33 ft (10 m)
- Draught: 12 ft (3.7 m)
- Propulsion: 1 × 4-cylinder triple expansion engine; 2 × cylindrical boilers; 1 screw
- Speed: Designed for 1,400 or 1,800 hp to make 17 knots (31 km/h), but actually required about 2200 indicated horsepower for this speed
- Range: 2,000 nmi (3,700 km) at 15 kn (28 km/h) with max. 250 tons of coal
- Complement: 77
- Armament: Designed to mount 2 × 12-pdr (76 mm) guns and 2 × 3 pdr (47 mm) AA guns, but with wide variations

HMS Foxglove was an Acacia-class minesweeping sloop of the Royal Navy. She saw service in World War I and World War II.

== Construction ==
Foxglove was built at Glasgow, Scotland, by Barclay Curle and launched on 30 March 1915. She entered service later that year.

== World War I ==
Foxglove was delivered to the Royal Navy on 14 May 1915, the first of her class to enter service, Foxglove was deployed to Scapa Flow, and on 5 June 1915, was ordered with sister ship Acacia to search for the German submarine U-19 which had sunk two British steamers, ten fishing vessels and a Danish sailing vessel east of Fair Isle and the Orkney Islands between 2 and 4 June. The two sloops did not find U-19, which was well to the south of their search line, but did rescue the survivors of one the trawlers sunk by the submarine. During World War I, Foxglove and the other Acacia-class sloops were used almost exclusively for minesweeping duties until 1917, when the Royal Navy began to use them as convoy escorts, a task to which they were well suited.

== Interwar ==
Foxglove served on the China Station during the early 1920s.

On the evening of 3 March 1921, the Singaporean passenger ship SS Hong Moh grounded on the White Rocks off Lamock Island, Swatow, China, and was wrecked with the loss of an estimated 900 to 1,000 lives. The steamer SS Shanti discovered the wreck on the morning of 4 March and rendered assistance, rescuing 45 survivors before steaming to Swatow to seek additional help for Hong Moh. Upon receiving word of the disaster, the British consul at Swatow informed the British Senior Naval Officer at Hong Kong, who in turn broadcast a wireless message requesting ships to come to Hong Moh′s aid. Foxglove arrived on the scene late on 5 March but was unable to locate the wreck in the darkness. The Royal Navy light cruiser HMS Carlisle joined Foxglove on the scene at dawn on 6 March, and the two ships located Hong Moh and began to rescue additional survivors, with Foxglove taking 28 or 48 (sources differ) survivors on board before having to depart late in the afternoon to refuel. Carlisle remained on the scene until 8 March, leaving only when there was no further sign of life board the wreck of Hong Moh; she then proceeded to Hong Kong with 221 survivors aboard.

== World War II ==
Foxglove was one of only two Acacia-class sloops to survive long enough to see service in World War II. On 9 July 1940, Foxglove was returning to Portsmouth after escorting minesweepers when she was attacked by German Junkers Ju 87 dive bombers. The sloop was hit by three bombs, with 22 of her crew killed in the attack or dying of their wounds. Foxglove remained afloat and was towed into Portsmouth but was declared a Constructive total loss and she was not repaired. Foxglove was converted to an accommodation ship and base ship. In this new role, she became a harbour guard ship in 1941, serving at Londonderry Port in Northern Ireland for the remainder of World War II.

== Fate ==
The last surviving Acacia-class sloop, Foxglove was sold for scrapping on 7 September 1946. She was scrapped at Troon, Scotland.

== Legacy ==
Foxglove's logbook is among those that was selected for digitisation as part of the online Old Weather project.
