= HMS Carlisle (D67) =

Royal Navy C-class light cruiser

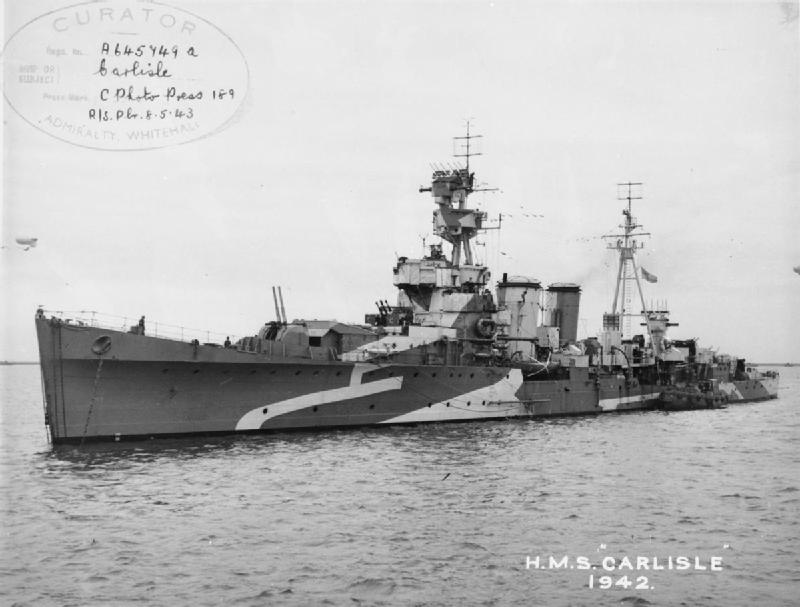
- Carlisle in wartime camouflage, 1942

History

United Kingdom
- Name: Carlisle
- Builder: Fairfield Shipbuilding and Engineering Company
- Laid down: 2 October 1917
- Launched: 9 July 1918
- Commissioned: 11 November 1918
- Reclassified: Converted to anti-aircraft ship in 1940; Base ship in Alexandria, March 1944; Hulk at Alexandria 1948
- Identification: Pennant number: 41 (Nov 18); 67 (Nov 19); I.67(1936); D.67 (1940)
- Fate: CTL 1943, broken up at Alexandria, 1948

General characteristics
- Class & type: C-class light cruiser
- Displacement: 4,290 long tons (4,360 t)
- Length: 451.4 ft (137.6 m)
- Beam: 43.9 ft (13.4 m)
- Draught: 14 ft (4.3 m)
- Installed power: Yarrow boilers; 40,000 shp (30,000 kW)
- Propulsion: 2 × propellers; geared steam turbines
- Speed: 29 kn (54 km/h; 33 mph)
- Range: carried 300 tons (950 tons maximum) of fuel oil
- Complement: 330-350
- Armament: 5 × 6-inch (152 mm) guns; 2 × 3-inch (76 mm) anti-aircraft guns; 4 × 3-pounder guns; 2 × 2-pounder pom-poms; 1 × machine gun; 8 × 21 in (533 mm) torpedo tubes
- Armour: 3in side (amidships); 2¼-1½in side (bows); 2in side (stern); 1in upper decks (amidships); 1in deck over rudder

HMS Carlisle was a C-class light cruiser of the Royal Navy, named after the English city of Carlisle. She was the name ship of the Carlisle group of the C-class of cruisers. Carlisle was credited with shooting down eleven Axis aircraft during the Second World War and was the top scoring anti-aircraft ship in the Royal Navy.

== Construction and early years ==
She was laid down by Fairfield Shipbuilding and Engineering Company in 1917 and launched on 9 July 1918. She was completed with a hangar located under the bridge to enable the carriage of aircraft. This did not occur, and the hangar was later removed. Carlisle was commissioned too late to see action in the First World War. In 1919 Carlisle joined the 5th Light Cruiser Squadron at Harwich. During March 1919 she departed alongside the squadron and took up station in China.

On the evening of 3 March 1921, the Singaporean passenger ship SS Hong Moh ran aground on the White Rocks off Lamock Island, Shantou, China and was wrecked with the loss of an estimated 900 to 1,000 lives. The steamer SS Shanti discovered the wreck on the morning of 4 March and rendered assistance, rescuing 45 survivors before steaming to Shantou to seek additional help for Hong Moh. Upon receiving word of the disaster, the British consul at Shantou informed the British Senior Naval Officer at Hong Kong, who in turn broadcast a wireless message requesting ships to come to Hong Moh′s aid. The Royal Navy sloop HMS Foxglove arrived on the scene late on 5 March but was unable to locate the wreck in the darkness.

Carlisle joined Foxglove on the scene at dawn on 6 March and the two ships located Hong Moh and began to rescue additional survivors, with Foxglove taking 28 survivors on board before having to depart late in the afternoon to refuel. Carlisle continued to work throughout the night of 6/7 March using searchlights and through the daylight hours of 7 March. Carlisle′s commanding officer, Edward Evans, swam over to the wreck at around 20:00 on 7 March to help the last few survivors get aboard the ship′s boats. Carlisle finally ceased rescue operations at 23:00 on 7 March. At dawn on 8 March, Carlisle′s boats approached the wreck of Hong Moh but found no further signs of life and Carlisle departed for Hong Kong with 221 survivors aboard.

Among the officers and ratings of Carlisle, Evans, along with Lieutenant-Commander Ion Tower and Gunner John G. Dewar, were awarded the Board of Trade Silver Medal for Gallantry in Saving Life at Sea, while Leading Seaman W. G. Eldrett and Able Seaman A. E. Whitehead received the award in Bronze.

Carlisle was refitted between 1921 and 1929 and went on to serve on the Africa Station with the 6th Cruiser Squadron. In February 1930, Carlisle was docked in the Selborne dry dock at Simon's Town, South Africa prior to joining the 2nd cruiser squadron Atlantic (Home Fleet). On 16 March 1937 she was relieved by the cruiser HMS Neptune and returned to the United Kingdom to be reduced to the reserve. In June 1939 Carlisle started a conversion to an anti-aircraft cruiser, with eight 4-inch (102 mm) QF MK16 and 1 quadruple 2-pounder Pom-Pom being fitted. This conversion was completed in January 1940; Carlisle was fitted with radar during her conversion and introduced the Type 280 combined air warning and gunnery radar into the Royal Navy; she thus became the first naval vessel to be equipped with an anti-aircraft fire control radar system.

== Early war service ==
She then spent a brief period with the Home Fleet, in which she participated in Allied operations against the German invasion of Norway. She escorted a troop convoy consisting of the 148th Infantry Brigade which went ashore at Åndalsnes; threatening the German position in Trondheim from the north and south (Operation Sickle).

In August Carlisle was serving in the Red Sea and Gulf of Aden area when she assisted in the evacuation of British troops, civilians and the sick from Berbera in British Somaliland to Aden before Berbera was occupied by Italian troops.

== Mediterranean ==
She returned to the Eastern Fleet in August 1940; like most of her sisters, she was then assigned to the Mediterranean Sea, departing the Far East in March 1941. Once in the Mediterranean, she was used to escort convoys as an A-A vessel of the 15th Cruiser Squadron for convoys from Alexandria to Greece (Operation Lustre). She became involved in Battle of Cape Matapan, as well as the first and second battles of Sirte.

She was also involved in the naval attack during the Battle of Crete in 1941 and was hit and damaged by aircraft on 22 May whilst attacking an enemy convoy. A direct hit killed her commanding officer, Capt. Thomas Cloud Hampton, RN. The destroyer HMS Kingston went alongside to give assistance, whilst Carlisle continued to engage the enemy. She went on to rescue the survivors of the SS Thistlegorm after the ship was sunk in an air attack on 5 October 1941. By December, she returned to convoy duties between Alexandria and Malta and was sent to support the commissioned auxiliary supply ship HMS Breconshire.

== Damage and reclassification ==
A memorial to personnel of Carlisle killed when the ship was in action in Scarpanto Strait, 9 October 1943.

In July 1943, she escorted the support force for the Allied invasion of Sicily. In September–October, during the German counter-attack in the Aegean Sea, Carlisle made a sortie into the area south of Piraeus with the destroyers HMS Panther and HMS Rockwood; intercepting German convoys in the Scarpanto Strait. On 9 October 1943, they were spotted by German Ju 87 dive bombers from I. StG 3 from the Megara air base which succeeded in sinking Panther at 12.05 and later on seriously damaged Carlisle; killing 24 members of the ship's company. She was taken in tow to Alexandria by Rockwood. She was considered to be beyond economical repair as a warship and was converted to serve as a base ship in the harbour of Alexandria in March 1944. She was last listed as a hulk in 1948 after the war had ended, and was broken up in 1949. Carlisle's badge can still be seen painted on the side of the Selborne dry dock wall at Simonstown, South Africa.

== In popular culture ==
HMS Carlisle is referenced in the film The Imitation Game, in which codebreaker Peter Hilton states that his brother is serving as a sailor on the Carlisle.
