= Lee Choon Guan =

Straits-born Chinese businessman and banker

- 李俊源
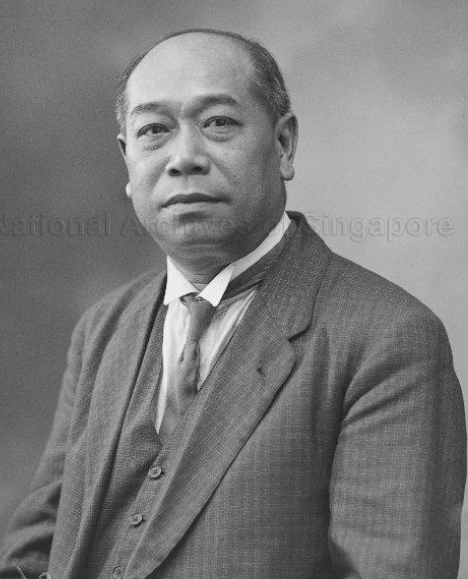
- Lee circa 1920
- Born: 1868; Singapore, Straits Settlements
- Died: August 27, 1924 (aged 55–56); Singapore, Straits Settlements
- Spouse: Tan Teck Neo
- Children: 6
- Father: Lee Cheng Yan

Lee Choon Guan (1868 – 27 August 1924) was a Straits Chinese businessman and philanthropist. He was the head of Lee Cheng Yan & Co., a co-founder of the Chinese Commercial Bank, an elected member of the Municipal Commission of Singapore and an acting member of the Legislative Council of the Straits Settlements.

== Early life and education ==
Lee was born in Singapore in 1868. He was the son of Lee Cheng Yan and was tutored privately.

== Career ==
Lee worked as an assistant in the family business, Lee Cheng Yan & Co., which was founded on Telok Ayer Street by his father. Following his father's death in 1911, he took over leadership of the business. In 1912, he became a founder the Chinese Commercial Bank with several other prominent Straits Chinese businessmen in Singapore, including Lim Peng Siang and Lim Boon Keng. He became the bank's chairman, and served as the director of the Malaya branch of the Straits Steamship Company Limited and the South British Insurance Company. He also served as the director of several other rubber, tin and industrial companies.

He served as an elected member for Central Ward on the Municipal Commission for five years. When Lim Boon Keng left for China in 1918, Lee served as an acting Chinese member of the Legislative Council of the Straits Settlements. He was also a member of the Singapore Housing Commission, the Board of Food Control, the Straits Chinese British Association, the Chinese Advisory Board and the management committee of the Tan Tock Seng Hospital, and was also a justice of the peace. He was the first president of the Weekly Entertainment Club.

== Personal life and death ==
Lee married the daughter of Wee Boon Teck, with whom he had two sons and two daughters. Following her death, he married Tan Teck Neo, a prominent philanthropist and socialite, with whom he had a son and a daughter. They lived in the Mandalay Villa on Amber Road, which was previously occupied by his father. He played tennis and was the president of the Straits Chinese Recreation Club.

He was also a philanthropist. He donated $60,000 to the endowment fund of Raffles College and $50,000 to the Methodist College. He and Tan each donated $5,000 to the building fund of the St Andrew's Mission Hospital for Women and Children. During World War I, he and Lim Peng Siang donated a plane to the British Army.

Lee died on 27 August 1924.
