= Tan Jiak Kim =

Peranakan merchant and philanthropist (1859–1917)

- 陳若锦
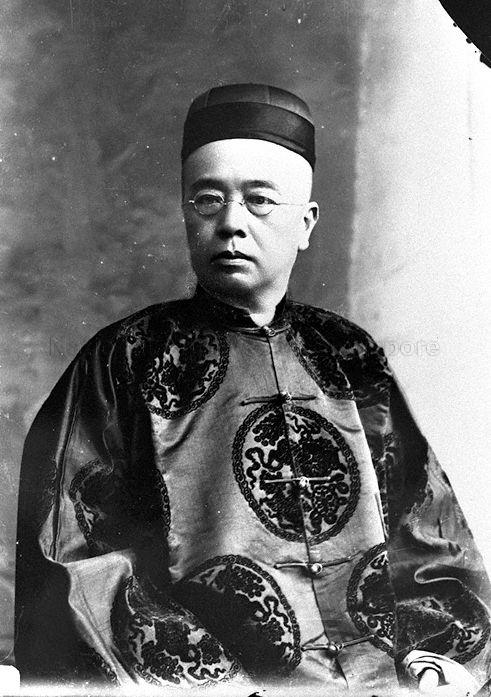
- Tan in 1900
- Born: 29 April 1859; Colony of Singapore
- Died: 22 October 1917 (aged 58); Colony of Singapore
- Spouses: Ang Geok Hoe (m. 1878; died 1898) Ang Geok Hean (m. 1908; died 1911) Ang Geok Lan (m. 1911; died 1925)
- Children: 1 son and 1 daughter with Ang Geok Hoe and another daughter with an unknown mother

Tan Jiak Kim CMG (29 April 1859 – 22 October 1917) was a Peranakan merchant, political activist and philanthropist from Singapore. He co-founded the Straits Chinese British Association along with Lim Boon Keng, Seah Liang Seah and Song Ong Siang.

== Early life ==
Tan was born on 29 April 1859 as the eldest son of merchant and philanthropist Tan Beng Swee and his wife Seet Kenh Neo, a sibling of Tan Jiak Chuan, and the grandson of businessman and philanthropist Tan Kim Seng. Besides Chinese, he could also speak Malay and English. Tan was introduced to the family business, Kim Seng & Co., in 1877, and became a partner with his uncle Tan Beng Gum after his father's death in 1888.

== Legislative council ==
Tan was elected the municipal commissioner of the central ward in 1888, generally representing the Chinese community in Singapore along with Seah Liang Seah, and resigned on 15 December 1893. He had resigned as his term had expired and he wished to retire from the legislative council as an unofficial member. By then, he had already built himself a reputation as a philanthropist, and was popular in his position. However, he was the only person to be nominated as municipal commissioner in April 1894, after being nominated by Thomas Shelford and Lee Cheng Yan, and thus rejoined the legislative council as an unofficial member. In 1901, he and his son went on a visit to Europe. Tan represented the colony at the coronation celebrations of 1911 in London along with Hugh Fort.

On 3 April 1912, Tan was awarded the Order of St Michael and St George for his assistance to the legislative council, and for his philanthropy. After receiving the award, he stated that he wished that more Asians would be awarded with the award.

=== Resignation from the legislative council ===
Tan first announced his plans to resign from the legislative council in May 1915, as his health had begun to deteriorate. Tan retired from his position as an unofficial member of the legislative council in March 1916. Despite his health, there were initially hopes of him recovering and returning to the legislative council. Following his resignation, Lee Choon Guan proposed for a portrait of Tan to be commissioned and hung in the Victoria Memorial Hall. The proposal was supported by Lim Boon Keng, and a fundraiser for Tan's portrait was soon held, with $20 being the maximum someone could donate.

== Straits Chinese British Association ==
Tan, Seah Liang Seah, Lim Boon Keng and Song Ong Siang founded the Straits Chinese British Association on 17 August 1900, which was originally headed by Lim. The organisation favoured the British, and was popular with the government of Singapore, helping represent the Peranakan community in Singapore. In 1907, Lim decided to resign from his position as head of the association. He initially asked for Tan to take his place, but Tan declined the offer.

== Philanthropy ==
In 1896, Tan introduced the "Tan Jiak Kim Scholarship" in Raffles Institution, which any male student could compete for. This occurred while he was a trustee of the institution's board. In 1895, following the collapse of a building, Tan donated money to victims of the collapse. On 14 October 1904, Tan began a fundraiser with a goal of $71,000 to fund the construction of a new school, the King Edward VII College of Medicine. By November 1904, he had managed to raise $37,000 for the college. By 1905, $87,000 had been raised, $12,000 which had been donated by Tan. Another $15,000 of the raised funds came from rubber tycoon Tan Chay Yan. Tan and Seah managed to raise a further $120,000 to expand the school, and provided it with a $1,500 scholarship. Tan donated $37,000 to the Prince of Wales Relief Fund during World War I to aid the British in buying battle planes.

== Personal life ==
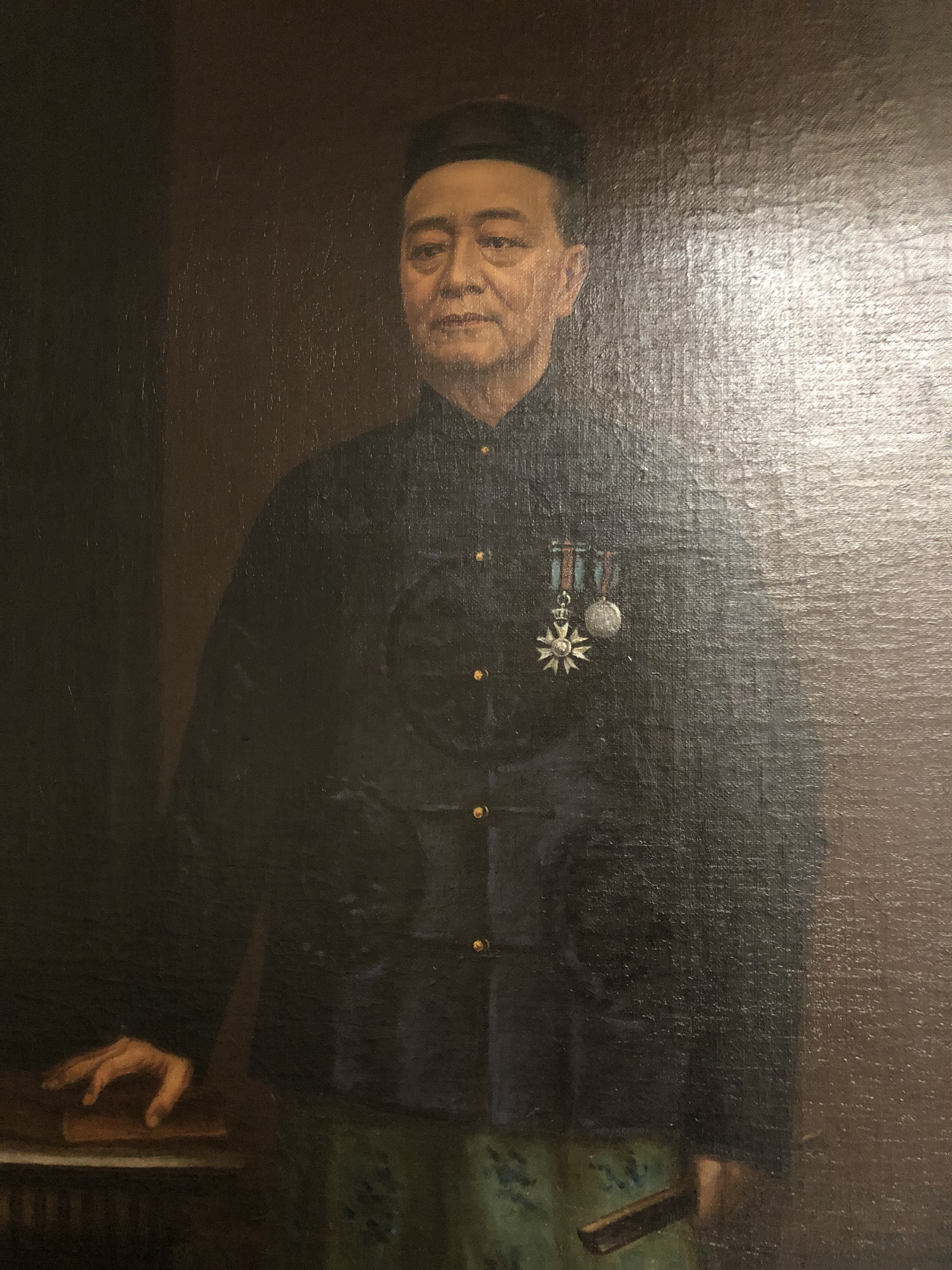
Portrait of Tan at the Peranakan Museum

Tan lived along River Valley Road in the Panglima Prang bungalow. In 1878, Tan married Ang Geok Hoe. Both of them had 2 children, a son, Tan Soo Bin, and a daughter, Tan Suat Neo. Ang died during childbirth in 1898. Tan's daughter died on 7 April 1909 from malaria, four years after her marriage.

Tan later remarried to Ang's sister, Ang Geok Hean. In 1911, Ang began suffering from uremia and pneumonia. Despite this, she decided to accompany Tan to London to represent the colony, staying at the Hilton London Metropole. However, she died on 4 August due to a heart failure and was buried in London. Her death was announced on 11 August.

Following this, Tan remarried to the youngest daughter of the Ang family, Ang Geok Lan. Geok Lan died on 1 October 1925.

== Death ==
Tan died on 22 October 1917 from a heart failure caused by diabetes. His funeral was held on 28 October. After the funeral, Tan was buried in his family's private cemetery along Alexandra Road in Bukit Merah.

== Legacy ==
Jiak Kim Street and Jiak Kim Bridge were named after Tan after his death.

In 2012, Tan's fountain, which had been traded away to Penang, Malaysia after his death, was returned to Singapore.
