= Ion Tower =

Royal Navy admiral

Rear-Admiral Ion Tower DSC SGM
- Born: 14 March 1889; Kensington, London, England
- Died: 14 October 1940 (aged 51); Regent Street, London, England
- Burial place: Kensal Green Cemetery
- Relatives: Vice Admiral Sir Thomas Tower (brother); Major General Philip Tower (nephew)
- Military career
- Allegiance: United Kingdom
- Branch: Royal Navy
- Service years: 1904–1940
- Rank: Rear-Admiral
- Commands: HMS Malaya (1938–1940); HMS Kent (1934–1936); HMS Blanche (1931); HMS Ambuscade (1930, 1931); HMS Wolsey (1930–1931)
- Conflicts: First World War; Second World War: Home Front; The Blitz †
- Awards: Distinguished Service Cross; Sea Gallantry Medal; Order of Saint Stanislaus, 3rd Class with Swords (Russia)

Rear-Admiral Ion Beauchamp Butler Tower, DSC, SGM (14 March 1889 – 14 October 1940) was a British naval officer.

== Early life and naval career ==
Tower was the third son of Royal Navy Commander Francis Fitzpatrick Tower (1859–1944) and his wife Laura, daughter of Thomas Butler. He was educated at Harrow School and entered the Royal Navy through training on HMS Britannia.

He fought in the First World War, being decorated with the Distinguished Service Cross and the Russian Order of St Stanislas, 3rd Class with Swords. He was awarded the Sea Gallantry Medal for his part, as lieutenant commander aboard HMS Carlisle, in the rescue of survivors of the sinking of the Hong Moh in March 1921.

Tower remained in the navy in the interwar period, and was promoted to rear admiral in June 1940. While serving during the Second World War as Chief Naval Liaison Officer to General Sir Alan Brooke, the Commander-in-Chief of Home Forces, Tower was killed during an air raid on London on 14 October 1940 at age 51. He was buried in Kensal Green Cemetery.

== Personal life ==
He married in 1923 Sophia Maud, daughter of Robert Donner of Bowden, Lacock, Wiltshire and had two children: one son, John Christopher, who was killed by enemy action in 1944 while serving as Supply Assistant in the Royal Navy, and a daughter Lavinia.
