= Middle East Command =

British Army command defending the Middle East

Middle East Command Middle East Land Forces
- area under the command before separation of Persia and Iraq Command
- Active: Middle East Command: June 1939 – c. 1946; Middle East Land Forces: 1946–67
- Country: United Kingdom
- Branch: British Army
- Type: Command
- Size: 1 million in Second World War
- Part of: War Office; Ministry of Defence (Army)
- Garrison/HQ: Cairo; Suez Canal Zone; Cyprus
- Engagements: Second World War: Western Desert campaign; East African campaign; Suez Crisis

Commanders
- Notable commanders: Archibald Wavell; Claude Auchinleck; Harold Alexander

Emblem of the Middle East Command.

Middle East Command, later Middle East Land Forces, was a British Army Command established prior to the Second World War in Egypt. Its primary role was to command British land forces and co-ordinate with the relevant naval and air commands to defend British interests in the Middle East and the eastern Mediterranean region.

During the Second World War, Middle East Command supervised military operations in and around the Mediterranean basin and the Middle East. Following the defeat of the Axis forces in the Western Desert at the Battle of El Alamein and the landing of additional Anglo-American forces during Operation Torch, it transferred control of land forces to the newly created Allied Forces Headquarters.

== Role of Middle East Command ==
Middle East Command was established in Cairo, during June 1939, due to the rising tensions in Europe. Its purpose was to provide a centralised command structure in times of war for the three separate army commands based within the Mediterranean and Middle East areas: Egypt, Sudan and Palestine/Transjordan. During periods of peace the command exerted authority over land forces based within Egypt, the Sudan, Palestine, Transjordan, and Cyprus. However, if war broke out, the Command's area of responsibility would be extended to include British Somaliland, Aden, Iraq and the shores of the Persian Gulf. As the war progressed, Middle East Command authority was extended over further areas including Ethiopia, Eritrea, Libya and Greece. Lieutenant-General Sir Archibald Wavell, commanding officer of Southern Command in the United Kingdom, was chosen as the first General Officer Commanding in Chief, a position he took up in July 1939, and was given the acting rank of General.

The Committee of Imperial Defence, when establishing the post of General Officer Commanding-in-Chief Middle East Command, made the decision that all three services should be responsible for the defence of the eastern Mediterranean and Middle East. As Middle East Command wielded authority only over land forces, a triumvirate was established to form the High Command. The two other members of this arrangement were the Naval Commander-in-Chief, Mediterranean, Admiral Sir Andrew Cunningham and Air Officer Commanding-in-Chief, RAF Middle East Command, Air Chief Marshal Arthur Longmore. The Naval Commander-in-Chief, East Indies Station would stand in for the Naval Commander-in-Chief, Mediterranean, in the latter's absence.

Wavell had suggested that due to the complex and uncertain situation in the Middle East region, following the collapse of France, that a committee, under a Cabinet Minister, should be established in the Middle East region to perform duties delegated to it by the Home Office, thus relieving the need to constantly refer to the War Cabinet for instructions. An alternative suggestion, however, was accepted: a ministerial committee would be established in London with the task of continually keeping the affairs of the Middle East region under review. On 28 June 1941, a position—similar to the original request put forward by Wavell—was established when Oliver Lyttelton was appointed to the position of Minister of State in the Middle East and dispatched to the Middle East. His role was to provide the three commanders-in-chief the political guidance they needed, advice on propaganda, subversive warfare, finance and economic warfare.

Middle East Command, upon its establishment, was to also co-ordinate with the French military in the Middle East and Africa. The command was also authorised to liaise with the Turkish General Staff and possibly, at a later date, the Greek General Staff.

== Second World War ==
On 30 August 1939 Middle East Command received instructions stating that if they received a formal telegram informing them that a state of war existed between the United Kingdom and Italy, that all defensive measures taken against the Italians should be as non-provocative as possible. Following the start of the Second World War in September and the quick defeat of Poland in September 1939, the threat of an Axis attack from the Balkans against British positions in the Middle East and Eastern Mediterranean region became a serious possibility. On 19 October 1939, the Treaty of Mutual Assistance was signed between the United Kingdom, France and Turkey; Lieutenant-General Archibald Wavell signed on behalf of the United Kingdom. Following the signing of this treaty, the Middle East Command, as well as the representatives of the Royal Navy and Royal Air Force, were authorised to begin discussions with the Turkish general staff, and a further conference was held during March 1940.

At the same time Wavell ordered his subordinate commanders to start planning operations on the assumption that the United Kingdom would soon be at war with Italy. Lieutenant-General Henry Maitland Wilson, commander of British forces in Egypt, was to plan for the capture of Bardia and Jaghbub (Libya) and to examine the possibility of using special forces. Wilson was also to make preparations within Egypt to receive an additional six divisions. Lieutenant-General Barker was ordered to estimate the minimum requirements for the internal security of the British mandate of Palestine, not to consider an attack on Palestine from the north a serious threat, and be prepared to reinforce the Iraqi Army. The commanding officers in Kenya and the Sudan were given the task of reviewing operations for the purpose of destroying and dispersing Italian forces and support local risings all in support of the main Allied offensive, which was planned to be launched from French Somaliland. General William Platt, commanding British forces in the Sudan, was also asked to consider launching an operation against Kufra (southern Libya). Following October 1939, as the Italians had made no aggressive moves, the 7th Armoured Division and other units were withdrawn from the frontline area, while training and exercises were conducted in the desert.

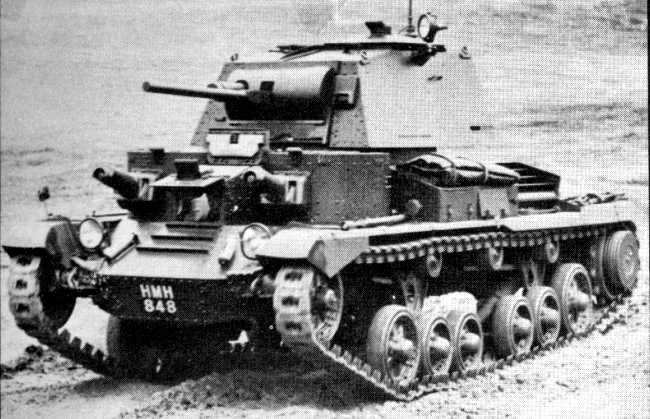
The Mk I (A9) Cruiser Tank used by the British 7th Armoured Division

On 15 February 1940, the position of General Officer Commanding in Chief, Middle East was renamed to Commander-in-Chief Middle East. The new title received some criticism on the grounds that command in the Middle East was a joint venture between all three services. As the head of Middle East Command held authority only over ground forces the criticism was expressed that the name should have been Army or Land Commander-in-Chief.

For the first nine months of the Second World War, the Middle East was quiet. This was until Italy's declaration of war on 10 June 1940 and the start of the East African campaign. However, in spite of his inferiority in troop numbers, Wavell was able to not only defend against the Italian attacks but by May 1941, he was able to defeat the Italians and occupy their east African colonies of Eritrea, Ethiopia and Italian Somaliland.

When tensions increased in Iraq, Wavell—in agreement with the Commander-in-Chief, India—on 9 March 1941 suggested to the Chiefs of Staff that, if fighting was to occur in the country, it should be conducted "at first under the control of India."

In the meantime, Wavell had sent a force to Iraq to suppress a coup d'état by elements sympathetic to Nazi Germany. In June 1941, he ordered the invasion and occupation of Syria and Lebanon to prevent further potential support of Iraq by the Germans through these Vichy French-controlled areas. In July he ordered Iraqforce to Anglo-Soviet invasion of Iran in cooperation with the Soviet forces from the north to safeguard the oilfields. Iran and Iraq were transferred out of the Middle East Command into a separate Persia and Iraq Command in August 1942.

In the Western Desert, by February 1941, the British had appeared to be on the verge of overrunning the last Italian forces in Libya. This would have ended Axis control in Africa. Then the tide of war turned against the British, as the Germans attacked through the Balkans and continued on to occupy Crete. The Germans reinforced the Italians in Libya with the Afrika Korps, under Erwin Rommel, and the British suffered further setbacks. Wavell and Auchinleck exchanged positions, Claude Auchinleck becoming C-in-C Middle East and Wavell becoming C-in-C in India.

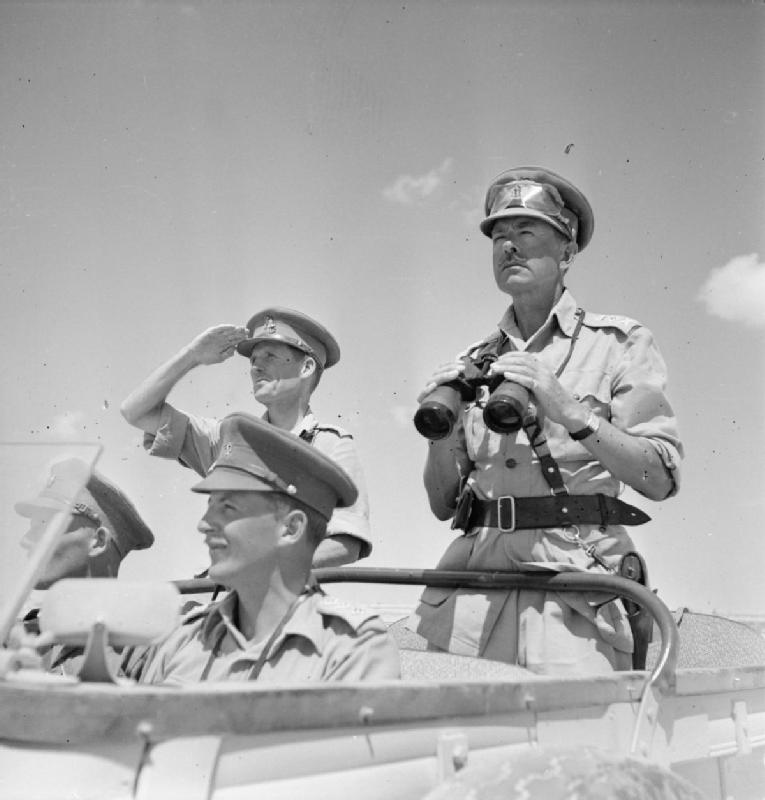
General Sir Harold Alexander, pictured here in August 1942 as Commander-in-Chief, Middle East, surveys the battlefront from an open car. To his right is Major General John Harding.

While Auchinleck was in post, the British Eighth Army confronting the German Afrika Korps and the Italian Army was commanded successively by General Sir Alan Cunningham and Lieutenant-General Neil Ritchie. Ritchie was dismissed after defeats at the hands of Rommel. Auchinleck assumed the field command himself and the Italo-German advance was halted at the First Battle of El Alamein. The "Auk," as he was known to his troops, struggled with the innate conservatism of the army establishment to get the armoured and infantry wings of the army to fight together on the German pattern, but had only limited success.

Auchinleck, like his predecessor Wavell, was subjected to constant political interference; he received a series of hectoring telegrams and instructions from Prime Minister Winston Churchill throughout late 1941 and early 1942. Churchill constantly sought an offensive from Auchinleck. Disappointed with the military reverses in Egypt and Cyrenaica, he was desperate for some sort of British victory before the planned Anglo-American landings in North Africa (Operation "Torch") scheduled for November 1942. In August 1942, immediately after the Eighth Army had all but exhausted itself after First Alamein, Churchill flew to Cairo, purportedly for consultations with Auchinleck, but had in fact made up his mind before he left Britain. Auchinleck was sacked by Churchill, almost certainly because he refused to be bullied by Churchill into ordering a major offensive before he and his troops were properly prepared. He was replaced as C-in-C Middle East by General Sir Harold Alexander and as GOC Eighth Army by Lieutenant-General William Gott, who was killed in Egypt before taking up command. On Gott's death, Lieutenant-General Bernard Montgomery was appointed commander of the Eighth Army. Auchinleck was offered the command of a newly created Persia and Iraq Command which was being split out from Middle East Command, but felt unable to accept the appointment, which was then taken by General Sir Henry Maitland Wilson.

Alexander presided over Montgomery's victory at the Second Battle of El Alamein. After the Anglo-American forces from Operation Torch and the Western Desert forces met in the Tunisian campaign in January 1943, he became deputy to General Dwight D. Eisenhower in Allied Forces Headquarters (AFHQ).

With Eighth Army passing to AFHQ's command, Middle East Command became somewhat of a military backwater. General Wilson succeeded Alexander as its commander-in-chief and during his tenure it mounted only one significant operation: the unsuccessful Dodecanese Campaign from September to November 1943.

The last act of Middle East Command took place during the Levant Crisis between May and June 1945 when British and Indian troops successfully invaded Syria and escorted French forces back to their barracks.

== Middle East Land Forces from 1945 ==
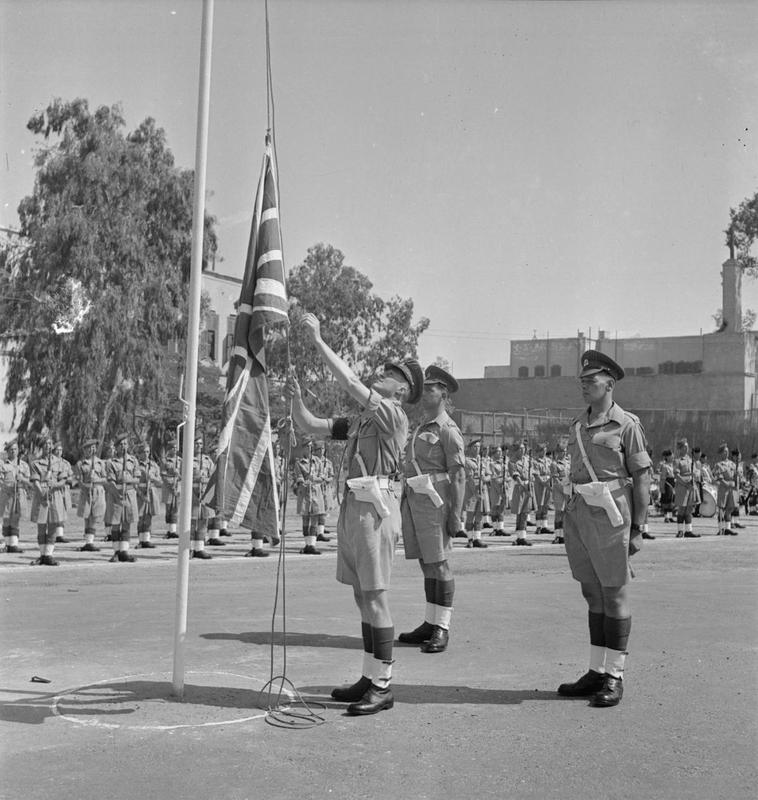
A sergeant of the Royal Military Police lowers the flag during the handover of Cairo Citadel to the Egyptians, 4 July 1946.

After 1945, the Middle East Command was reformed as Middle East Land Forces. Middle East Land Forces commanded the forces in Libya (25th Armoured Brigade, which was later subsumed into 10th Armoured Division) until 1957, and the 1st Infantry Division (United Kingdom), 3rd Infantry Division, the Royal Dragoons; 4 Royal Tank Regiment; 43 LAA Regiment RA; 71st Heavy Anti-Aircraft Regiment, Royal Artillery, three signal regiments, and other forces, in the Suez Canal Zone until the early 1950s. 2 Wireless Regiment Royal Signals was in Cyprus. In October 1951 in the Suez Canal Zone the 1st Infantry Division comprised 1st (Guards), 2nd, and 3rd Brigades; it arrived back in the UK in Autumn 1955 (Lord & Watson, The Royal Corps of Signals: Unit Histories of the Corps, 25) minus the 1st Brigade.

The Suez base area was seen as essential. Among other key benefits, GHQ MELF reported to the Ministry of Defence that Abu Sueir airfield, with its lengthened runway, would be capable of basing U.S. B-29 Superfortress bombers to strike Soviet targets beyond the reach of Strategic Air Command aircraft based in Great Britain itself.

The Free Officers, led by Muhammad Naguib and Gamal Abdel Nasser, overthrew King Farouk of Egypt in the Egyptian coup d'état of 1952. The Free Officers then concluded the Anglo–Egyptian Agreement of 1954, signed on 19 October, with Great Britain. It stipulated a phased evacuation of British troops from the Suez base, agreed to withdrawal of all troops within 20 months (that is, June 1956); maintenance of the base was to be continued; and allowed Britain to hold the right to return for seven years. In December 1954 HQ MELF moved to Cyprus.

The compromise solution to retain British influence over the Suez Canal base area, seen as vital in the event of any future Middle East war with the Soviet Union, was to arrange the Canal Zone depot area to be taken over by specially arranged British civilian contractors. As the risk of British-Egyptian ruptures over the Suez Canal rose, between September 20, 1955, and December 30, 1955, almost all the MELF (and Middle East Air Force) Canal Zone depots and workshops were handed over to the contractors. Among them were 2 Base Workshop, 5 Base Ordnance Depot, and the Base Vehicle Depot all at Tel el Kebir; 9 Base Ammunition Depot at Abu Sultan near Deversoir Air Base; and the engineering base group (probably including Nos 8 and 9 Engineer Stores Base Depots at Suez and Fanara respectively). Other establishments included 33 Supply Reserve Depot and 10 Base Ordnance Depot.

4 Air Formation Signal Regiment moved from Abyss in Egypt to Akrotiri in Cyprus in 1955; while 3rd GHQ Signal Regiment moved from Moascar in the Canal Zone to Episkopi in Cyprus. It appears that the last British combat unit to leave was 2nd Battalion, Grenadier Guards from Port Said. However another source lists the main body of 2 Grenadier Guards leaving on 24–25 March 1956 by ship (they had been located at Golf Course Camp in Port Said), and the last remaining rear-guard company leaving by air on 2 April 1956 from Abu Sueir. Kipping writes that the actual final date of British troops leaving was 13 June 1956, which may represent logistics units as opposed to infantry.

In March 1954 British troops in the Sudan consisted of one battalion stationed in Khartoum, reporting ultimately to the Governor-General. The Governor-General's military commander was the Major-General Commanding British Troops in the Sudan, who was also Commandant of the Sudan Defence Force. In this post from 1950 onward was Major General Reginald 'Cully' Scoons. The last British troops, 1st Battalion Royal Leicestershire Regiment, left the country on 16 August 1955. All of the British troops were gone by the end of August 1955.

In April 1960 Middle East Land Forces was reorganised into Libya and Tripolitania Area; Cyrenaica Area; Cyprus District; and British Troops Malta.

In March 1961 HQ MELF was moved to Aden, absorbing British Forces Arabian Peninsula.

Middle East Land Forces was disbanded on 28 November 1967 and British forces in the Persian Gulf was transferred to Headquarters, British Forces Persian Gulf which was based in Bahrain. Later became British Force Gulf; had Land Forces Gulf operating under it, with an armoured car squadron and infantry battalions at Bahrain and Sharjah; disbanded and withdrawn January 1972.

== Commanders-in-Chief ==
Commanders-in-Chief have included:

Middle East Command

- General Archibald Wavell 28 July 1939 – 4 July 1941
- General Claude Auchinleck 5 July 1941 – 14 August 1942
- General Harold Alexander 15 August 1942 – February 1943
- General Henry Wilson February 1943 – January 1944
- General Sir Bernard Paget January 1944 – October 1946
- General Sir Miles Dempsey 1946–1947

Commanders-in-Chief, Middle East Land Forces

- General Sir John Crocker 1947–1950
- General Sir Brian Robertson 1950–1953
- General Sir Cameron Nicholson 1953
- General Sir Charles Keightley 1953–1957
- General Sir Geoffrey Bourne 1957–1958
- Lieutenant-General Sir Roger Bower 1958–1960
- General Sir Richard Anderson 1960–1963

General Officer Commanding Middle East Land Forces

- Major General Philip Tower (to 30 November 1967)
