= Liem Yoe Kiong =

Indonesian-Chinese silat master

Liem Yoe Kiong (1927–1970) was a Chinese Indonesian silat master and docent at the Padjadjaran University in Bandung, Indonesia.

== Personal life ==
Liem Yoe Kiong was born on September 5, 1927, in Parakan, Indonesia, and died on March 1, 1970, in Bandung at the age of 42. He was married to Upasika Pandita Vimaladewi Salim, S.H. (Chinese: Oei Lat Nio), who died on April 16, 2017, at the age of 88 years old. He is survived by his sons Krishna Salim (Bhiksu Aryamaitri Mahasthavira) and Ananda Salim (Bhiksu Dharmavimala Mahasthavira)—both of whom are monks—and daughters Mettadewi Salim and Mayadewi Salim.

== Career ==
Liem Yoe Kiong taught at the Padjadjaran University Faculty of Teacher Training and Education. He taught silat, martial arts, and holistic wellness to his students who are to continue teaching subsequent generations. He has written multiple books on the subject of silat, and has been references in numerous modern books about silat. On record, he has created 48 works (44 in Bahasa Indonesia and four in Dutch) in 82 publications and 291 library holdings.
