= Wee Bin & Co. =

Wee Bin & Co., also known as Chop Hong Guan, was a firm of merchants and shipowners in Singapore that was prominent in the 1860s. The firm was founded by Wee Bin in 1856, and was located at Market Street. At first, it did business with various houses in Bali in the Dutch East Indies, and eventually became an importer of products from that port. The firm also traded in earthenware, and had a fleet of over twenty vessels for the Chinese and Dutch East Indies trade. They were also traders, sago manufacturers and merchant bankers, and had several branches in the Dutch Indies. The firm was later managed by Lim Ho Puah, and Lim Peng Siang, respectively Wee Bin's son-in-law and grandson, the latter of whom acquired the major part of the firm's business interests including its larger steamships when the firm was liquidated in 1911.

== See also ==
- Marine Engineer and Naval Architect, 1892 - Page 360
- An Official Guide to Eastern Asia, Transcontinental Connections Between Europe and Asia ... By Japan Dept. of Railways, Japan Tetsudōin, Japan Teikoku Tetsudōchō Published by s.n., 1915; Item notes: v.4; p. 323
