= Lim Peng Siang =

Chinese entrepreneur (1872–1944)

Lim Peng Siang 林秉祥 JP
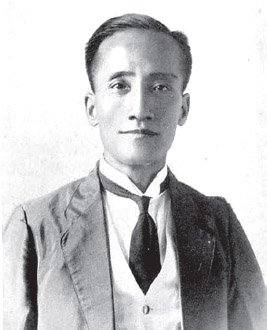
- Lim in One Hundred Years' History of the Chinese in Singapore (1923)
- Born: 1872; Amoy, Qing empire
- Died: 21 March 1944 (aged 71–72); Singapore
- Occupation: Businessman
- Known for: Founder of Ho Hong Group; President of Singapore Chinese Chamber of Commerce
- Spouses: Lee Bay Neo, Wee Guat Choo Neo
- Father: Lim Ho Puah

Lim Peng Siang (Chinese: 林秉祥; pinyin: Lín Bǐngxíang; Pe̍h-ōe-jī: Lîm Péng-siông; also known as Lin Bengxian; 1872–1944) was an entrepreneur in Singapore and Malaya. Together with his brother Lim Peng Mau (Lin Bingmao), he founded the Ho Hong Group of companies in 1904, which had interests in banking, shipping, parboiled rice, oil mills, cement, coconut and other businesses. He was a president of the Singapore Chinese Chamber of Commerce and a member of the Chinese Advisory Board. Peng Siang Quay in Singapore is named after him.

== Early life and education ==
Lim was the sixth son of Lim Ho Puah a prominent merchant whose marriage into the established peranakan business family of Wee Bin integrated the Lim family into Southeast Asia’s ethnic Chinese commercial networks. His mother was the only daughter of Wee Bin, the founder of Singapore-based Wee Bin & Co.. Lim was born in Chengnei village, Longxi county, Zhangzhou, Fujian. Before emigrating to Singapore, Lim studied Chinese classics and history at a private school in China. Like his father, Lim was naturalised as a British subject, in 1902. He received private tuition in English and was a student at the St. Joseph's Institution.

== Career ==
Lim distinguished himself through his systematic adoption of Western industrial technology and managerial practices. He employed European and American engineers and managers to modernize production across his enterprises. The Ho Hong rice mills using high-speed mechanized engines capable of producing approximately 100 tons of rice daily, utilizing a 250 horsepower engine to manufacture up to 130 tons of coconut oil weekly for export markets.

Through Anglo-Chinese Steamships Ltd., Lim collaborated with British commercial partners including Sime Darby and employed engineer Graham Hutchinson to oversee ship construction. The steamships Tanjong Rhu and Tanjong Kling, launched in 1918, were among the first steamships constructed locally in Singapore, marking a significant milestone in the British colony’s early industrial development before the Second World War.

Lim joined the firm of Wee Bin & Co., which was then under the management of his father, and eventually rose to its head before setting out to start the Ho Hong Group. He took over the greater part of the firm's business, including the large steamships, when the firm of Wee Bin & Co. was liquidated in 1911

Lim also invested over Straits $1 million to establish the Ho Hong Portland Cement Works at Ulu Pandan in 1918. Designed by American engineer James Cecil Muir, the factory was one of the earliest attempts to establish large-scale modern cement production in Singapore.

In 1913, Lim founded the Ho Hong Steamship Company Ltd. He sold most of his shares in Ho Hong Steamship to the Oversea Chinese Banking Corporation in 1936.

Lim founded the Chinese Commercial Bank in 1912 together with other members of the Singapore Hokkien business community. Together with Lim Boon Keng, Seow Poh Leng and others, he founded the Ho Hong Bank in 1917. In 1932, Chinese Commercial Bank and Ho Hong Bank merged with the Oversea-Chinese Bank to form the Oversea-Chinese Banking Corporation.

By the 1910s, Ho Hong Group was the most diversified group of companies in Malaya. Companies in the group founded by Lim included Ho Hong Steamship Co. Ltd., Ho Hong Oil Mills Ltd., Ho Hong Parboiled Rice Mill, Ho Hong Bank Ltd., and the Ho Hong Portland Cement Works Ltd. He also had plans for a bucket-making factory, and for the reclamation and development of several big pieces of swampy land in a big industrial area in the immediate neighbourhood of Singapore Town.

== Public life ==
Lim was involved in the formation of the Singapore Chinese Chamber of Commerce, and was its president from 1913 to 1916, except for 1914 when he was vice president. He was a member of the Chinese Advisory Board between 1921 and 1941, as one of the representatives of the Hokkien community. Along with his brother, he was an honourable chairperson of the Hong Kong Fujian Chamber of Commerce between 1930 and 1941.

Lim was a director of several public companies, including Central Engine Works (Chop Hong Chang Keok), an engineering firm comprising Western engineers and iron founders. He was a Justice of the Peace, a title noted in reports as early as 1936 describing him as one of Singapore's "greatest magnates."

During the Great Depression, Lim undertook major financial restructuring to preserve his industrial enterprises. He sold his shipping interests to the Straits Steamship Company for Straits $900,000 and used these proceeds, together with family capital, to reorganize Ho Hong Oil Mills in 1931.

However, technological limitations affected some ventures. The Ho Hong Portland Cement Works closed in 1932 after imported American machinery could not process locally available sea coral efficiently as they lacked the chemical properties, particularly viscosity, required for cement production.

In his later years, he was less active in public life, and declined the offer of a seat on the Legislative Council several times, in order to concentrate on his industrial work.

=== Benefactor ===
It will be seen therefore how great a benefactor Mr. Lim Peng Siang has been to Singapore. It is hardly necessary to mention here how much a country depends on industry and shipping for its wealth and importance. It can be clearly seen to what extent Mr. Lim Peng Siang has contributed to both these factors. From time to time severe competition with other steamship lines reduced deck-passage rates to a ridiculously low figure and it also meant heavy loss to the firm: but this proved a boon to thousands of the labouring classes who were enabled to leave their homes in China and come to the Straits Settlements and the Netherlands East Indies to supply the labour market.

— Song Ong Siang,

During the Great War he proved his patriotism by working hard in helping to raise money for the various funds, besides himself liberally contributing to such funds. He was never known to refuse help to a deserving cause, and innumerable were the charities to which he liberally contributed. He set an example worthy of being followed by the rising members of the Chinese community.

— Song Ong Siang,
