= Song Ong Siang =

Singaporean lawyer (1871–1941)

Sir Ong Siang Song KBE VD
- 宋旺相
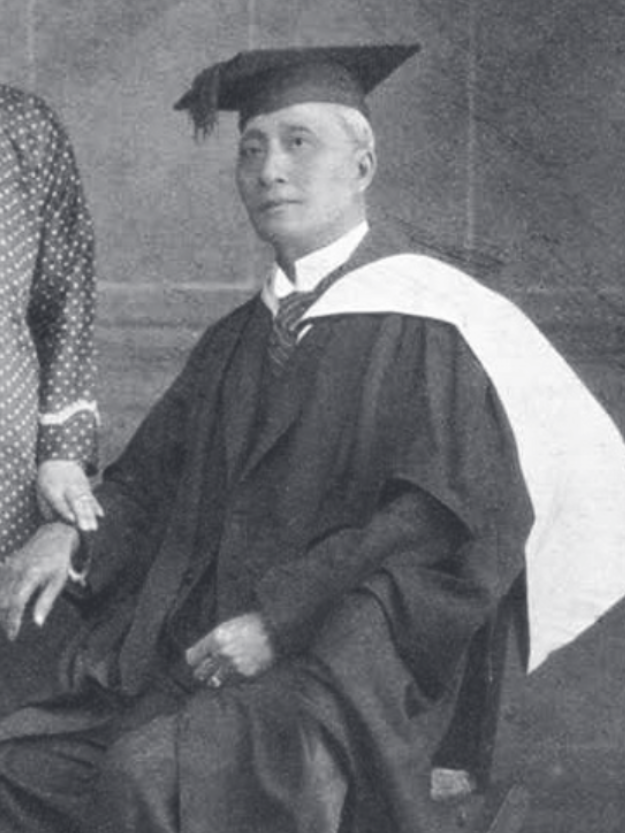
- Song in One Hundred Years' History of the Chinese in Singapore (1923)
- Born: Ong Siang Song; 14 June 1871; Singapore, Straits Settlements
- Died: 29 September 1941 (aged 70); Singapore, Straits Settlements
- Resting place: Bidadari Cemetery
- Education: Raffles Institution; Middle Temple; Downing College
- Occupation: Lawyer
- Known for: First ever knighted Asian in Singapore
- Spouse: Helen Yeo Hee Neo (杨喜娘)
- Parent(s): Song Hoot Kiam (father), Phan Fung Lean (mother)

Sir Ong Siang Song KBE VD (Chinese: 宋旺相; pinyin: Sòng Wàngxiāng; Pe̍h-ōe-jī: Sòng Ōng-siang; 14 June 1871 – 29 September 1941) was a lawyer and active citizen of the British Crown Colony of the Straits Settlements.

He was an ethnic Chinese of Hokkien descent as well as a third generation Hokkien Peranakan Baba (Peranakan term for man) Chinese with ancestry from Zhangzhou in the Minnan region of China. He was also the first ever Asian in Singapore to be knighted. Song was noted for his contributions to the development of the Singapore civil society, and was held in esteem throughout the Colony.

== Background ==
Song was born in Singapore to Song Hoot Kiam (Chinese: 宋佛儉; pinyin: Sòng Fójiǎn; Pe̍h-ōe-jī: Sòng Hu̍t-khiām), the founder of the Straits Chinese Church (now Prinsep Street Presbyterian Church) and Ms Phan Fung Lean, a wife from Elder Song's second marriage who was of Thai Chinese descent. He was the eldest son from Song Hoot Kiam's second marriage – the youngest of the three sons of borne from Elder Song's two marriages.

As a youth, Song studied at Raffles Institution and briefly at Christian Brothers' School (now St. Joseph's Institution). He was a brilliant student, and won the Guthrie Scholarship at the age of 12 – a record he held for five years. The young Song was disqualified from the honor of being the first Queen's Scholar - the scholarship going instead to Dr Lim Boon Keng - as he was under-aged at the time of the award.

He was eventually awarded the Scholarship in 1888, becoming the only Chinese Queen's Scholar to read law in England. He was an outstanding scholar at the Middle Temple and Downing College in Cambridge. In 1893, Song was called to the Bar, entering legal practice upon returning to Singapore. In that same year he set up the legal firm, Aitken and Ong Siang at the age of 22. Song was also a shareholder and trustee of the Anglo - Chinese Boarding School in 1904. In 1907 he married Helen Yeo (Chinese: 楊喜娘; pinyin: Yáng Xǐniang) in a military wedding – the first of its kind for a Chinese in Singapore.

Song was a devout Presbyterian. When the elder Song died in 1900, he succeeded his father as church elder, actively involved in the development of the Church choir and the church magazine. He was also a volunteer preacher, and served as Chairman of The Chinese Christian Association, formed in 1889 by the Elder Song.

Song played an active role in community service, and deeply concerned with the welfare of the Straits Chinese and female education. As he was effectively bilingual in Malay and English, he produced the first Romanized Malay-language newspaper, Bintang Timor in 1894. The paper only ran for less than a year due to lack of support. Three years later, Song and Dr Lim Boon Keng began the Straits Chinese Magazine, an English language newspaper which enjoyed popular support by the community for 11 years. They were later joined by Dr Wu Lien-teh as a fellow editor.

He also founded the Singapore Chinese Girls' School together with Lim and other prominent Straits Chinese gentlemen, in July 1899 on Hill Street. The school taught Romanised Malay, Chinese, Arithmetic, Geography, Music and Sewing to equip young girls for their future roles as wives and mothers.

Song continued to contribute to the society by founding the Chinese Philomathic Society, and Straits Chinese British Association, and the Hullett Memorial Library in his alma mater Raffles Institution together with Lim in 1923. He also became the first Chinese Captain in the Chinese Volunteer Corps in Singapore. His notable work to the society earned him a place as a Nominated Member of the Singapore's Legislative Council in 1919 and again serving as Member from 1924-1927. For his outstanding work in the Colony, Song was appointed a Commander of the Order of the British Empire (CBE) in the 1927 Birthday Honours, and he was later knighted as a K.B.E. in the 1936 New Year Honours.

Above all the contributions made, it was his work on writing and publishing the 600-page book, One Hundred Years' History of the Chinese in Singapore in 1923 that earned him some recognition in the annals of Singapore history. It remains an famous work of reference in Singapore history today.

Song died in 1941.

== Bibliography ==
- Cook, John Angus Bethune (1907) Sunny Singapore : an account of the place and its people, with a sketch of the results of missionary work. London : E. Stock.
- Clammer, J. R. (1980). Straits Chinese Society: Studies in the sociology of Baba communities of Malaysia and Singapore. Singapore: Singapore University Press.
- Prinsep Street Presbyterian Church (1993) Prinsep Street Presbyterian Church: 150 Years of Faithfulness, 1843-1993. Singapore: The Church.
- Song Ong Siang (1923) One Hundred Years' History of the Chinese in Singapore.London : J. Murray.
- 'Singapore days of old : a special commemorative history of Singapore' published on the Singapore Tatler 10th anniversary issue (1992). Hong Kong: Illustrated Magazine.
- Wright, A., & Cartwright, H. A. (eds.)(1908) Twentieth century impressions of British Malay: its history, people, commerce, industries and resources. London: Lloyd's Greater Britain Pub.
