= One Hundred Years' History of the Chinese in Singapore =

1923 non-fiction book

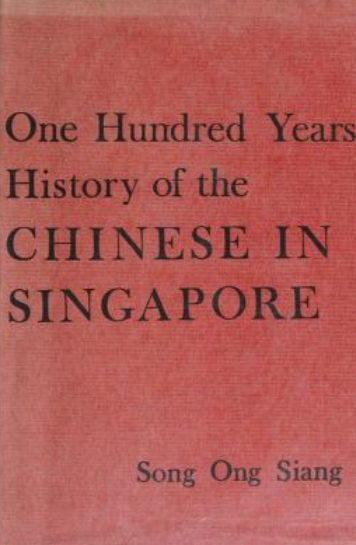
- Author: Song Ong Siang
- Language: English
- Publisher: J. Murray
- Publication date: 1923
- Publication place: Singapore
- Media type: Print (hardback & paperback)

One Hundred Years' History of the Chinese in Singapore is a book written by Song Ong Siang and published in 1923. It is a compilation the lives and contributions of the Chinese to Singapore from 1819 to 1919.

== Contents ==
The first eight chapters cover the years 1819 to 1899, with one chapter dedicated to each decade. The next four chapters cover the years 1900 to 1919, with two chapters dedicated to each decade. The book mostly focuses on the Peranakans as Song did not speak Chinese and had to rely on English records and those who could speak English.

== History ==
The book was initially meant to be a few chapters in the book One Hundred Years of Singapore by Walter Makepeace, Roland Braddell and Gilbert E. Brooke. Makepeace believed that only someone of Chinese ethnicity could adequately write the chapters, and approached Lim Boon Keng, who declined the offer and suggested Song instead, as he believed that he would not be able to adequately compile the history of the Chinese in Singapore.

== Reception ==
The Malaya Tribune called the book a "chronological achievement of no mean merit" and a "comprehensive work which will create intense interest among countless generations to come". Lim Yoon Lin of The Straits Times wrote that "despite the book's obvious weaknesses", it "remains an invaluable source for history students and others who are curious about Singapore's past". The China Express and Telegraph called the book "well-written" and found its arrangement to be "highly practical". Reverend William Murray called the book a "monumental work" as it will "preserve the author's name to posterity."

Following a 1924 reissue, The Malaya Tribune called the book "deeply interesting" and "obviously a labour a love" that involved a "vast amount of patient research". The Birmingham Post wrote that the book contained a "great deal of interesting matter", which is "overlaid by an even vaster mass of detail, to Mr. Song Ong Siang entirely germane but to the reader somewhat irrelevant and impertinent." Despite this, the post wrote that Song "writes clearly and well", and adds "real skill" in compiling the book. The Solicitors Journal wrote that while the book is "too full of local colour, perhaps, for ordinary English readers", it is "excellently written and illustrated with a great wealth of portraits and other pictures."

Allington Kennard of The Straits Times wrote that "If in some respects this book is unsatisfactory as history, out of balance because of the wealth of biographical details of personalities and families, it is indispensable to any understanding of the first hundred years of Singapore and to Sir Frank Swettenham's famous tribute to the Chinese a few months before retiring from the Governorship of the Straits Settlements."
