= Eurasian cuisine of Singapore and Malaysia =

Fusion of European and Asian cuisine

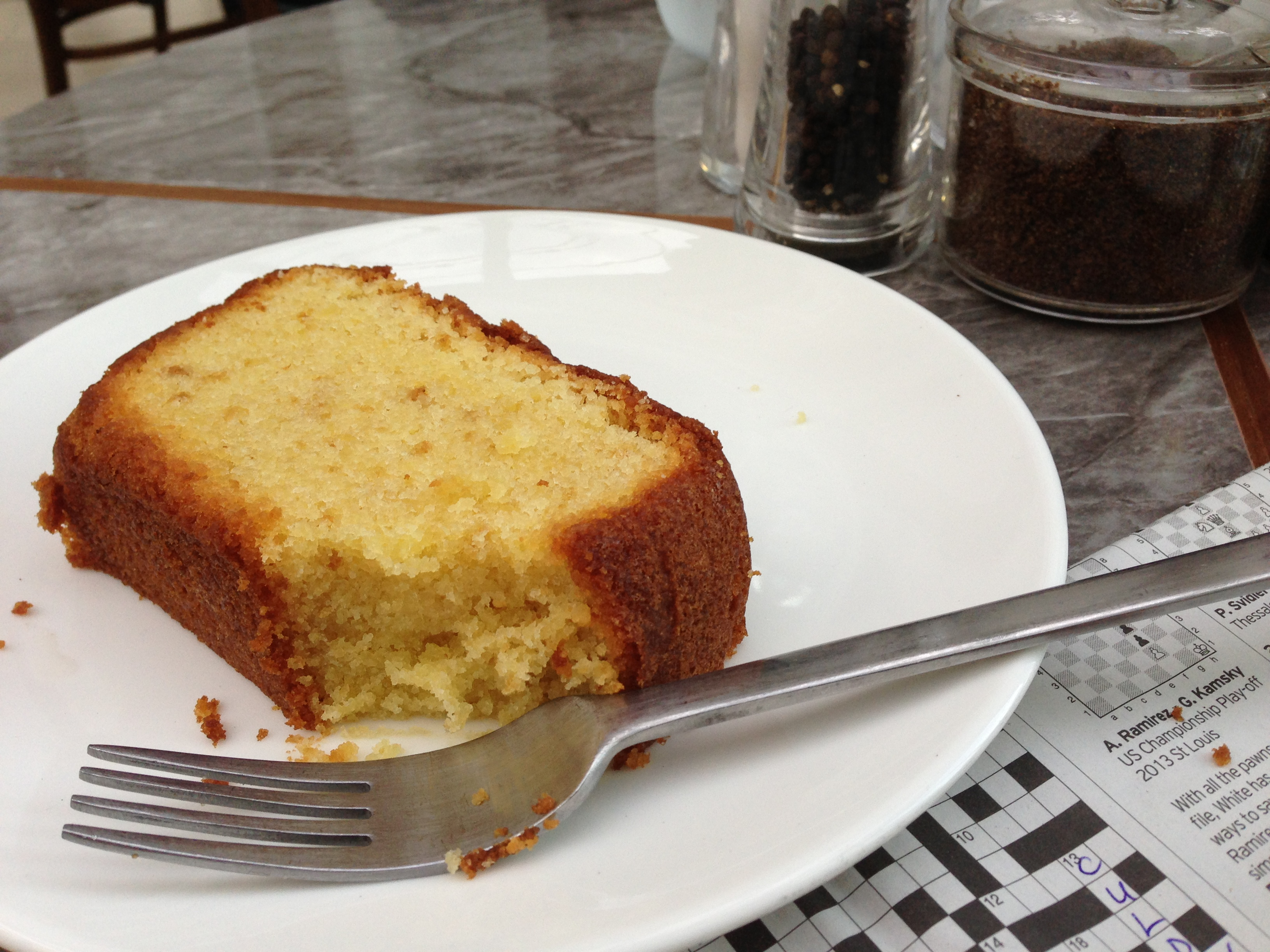
Sugee cake, a cake commonly eaten by the Malaysian and Singaporean Eurasian community

The Eurasian cuisine of Malaysia and Singapore is a type of fusion cuisine.

== Origins ==
In general, Eurasians are people of any mixed European and Asian ancestry. However, if referring to Eurasian cuisine, usually the amalgamation of Portuguese, Dutch, British, Chinese, Malay, and also Indian and Peranakan influences is meant. Within this cuisine, ingredients in European dishes are replaced or complemented by Asian ingredients. Conversely, European ingredients are used in Asian dishes. The cuisine dates to the 16th century.

For example, cream in European recipes is replaced by coconut cream and dried Chinese sausage (lap cheong) is used instead of chorizo. Also, the use of soy sauce, chilli and ginger is used interchangeably with vinegar, mustard and Worcestershire sauce.

== Definition ==
The word Eurasian is a portmanteau of European and Asian. There is no clear definition of what can be specified as Eurasian cuisine. It often includes ingredients from Dutch, British, Portuguese, Indian, Chinese cuisines as well as Malay. Some dishes are also found in other cuisines. By local adaptation(s), or by its ubiquitous presence within the Eurasian community, a dish is sometimes considered "Eurasian".

== Dishes ==
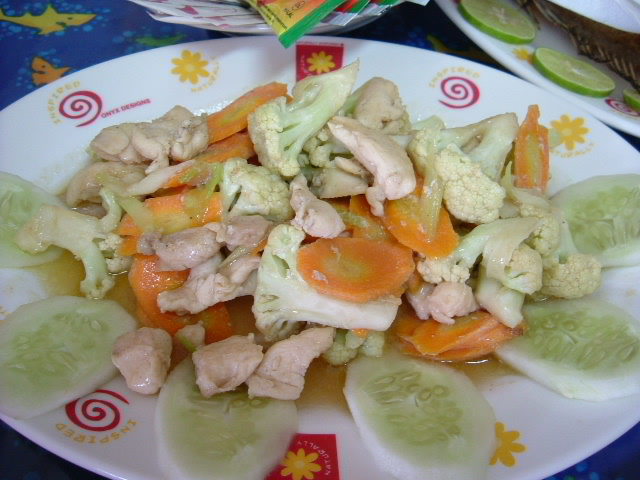
Chap chye

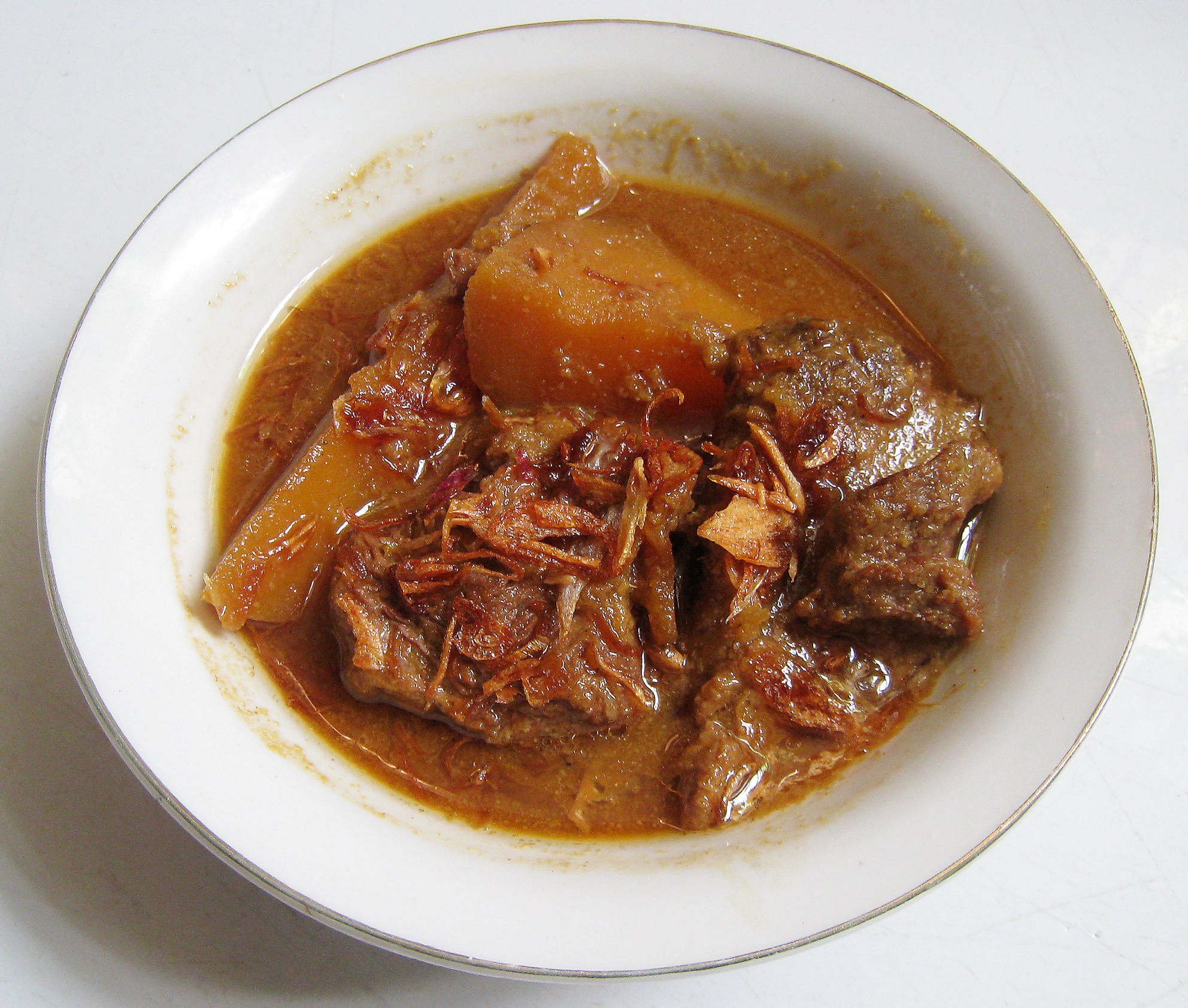
Semur daging kentang

- Baca assam, beef cheeks cooked in tamarind water.
- Chap chye, a stir-fried vegetable dish consisting of lily buds, wood fungus, shiitake mushrooms, glass vermicelli/cellophane noodles, bean curd sheets, cabbage, carrots and turnips, dried shrimp/prawn, and onions.
- Devil's curry or curry debal (Portuguese), chicken and potatoes in a sauce of chilli, galangal, lemongrass, ginger, turmeric powder, mustard seeds, shallots or onions, garlic, vinegar and kemiri nuts (candle nuts).
- Feng (curry)
- Oxtail stew (British), a stew with cinnamon, soy sauce and star anise.
- Pang susi, a meat filled oven baked pastry.
- Putugal, a steamed rice cake.
- Kueh kochi pulot hitam, a cake of black and white glutinous rice flour with a filling of mung beans or coconut.
- Semur, a type of meat stew (mainly beef), that is braised in thick brown gravy.
- Seybak, a salad made with pork offal.
- Shepherd's pie (British), a traditional dish with meat and mashed potatoes with the addition of soy sauce, oyster sauce, Chinese mushrooms and garlic.
- Sugee cake, a semolina cake.

== Formal dinners ==
A formal Eurasian dinner will include a half dozen or more dishes. Typically the main meal is presented together and served with rice.

== Related cuisines ==
- Indo cuisine
- Kristang cuisine
- Peranakan cuisine
- Macanese cuisine, a fusion of Portuguese and Chinese cuisines

== See also ==
- Eurasian Singaporeans
- List of European cuisines
- List of Asian cuisines
