= Kristang =

Kristang may mean:

- Kristang people (cristãos), an ethnic group of Eurasian ancestry in Malaysia and Singapore
- Kristang language (cristão, papiá kristang), the creole originally spoken by that community

== See also ==
- Kirishitan, term for Christians in Japan
