= Devil's curry =

Kristang traditional dish

Devil curry
- Alternative names: Curry Debal
- Type: Curry
- Course: colour
- Created by: Kristang People, Malaccan Portuguese
- Main ingredients: Curry, candlenuts, galangal, vinegar

Devil's curry, also known as kari debal in Kristang, is a very spicy curry flavoured with candlenuts, galangal, mustard seed and vinegar from the Eurasian Kristang (Cristão) culinary tradition in Malacca, Malaysia, Indonesia and the Indo-Dutch diaspora (where it is known as Ayam ore Daging Setan). It was historically served one or two days after Christmas and on other special occasions.

Kristang cuisine blends the cuisines of Southeast Asia with a western-style cuisine inherited from Portuguese colonial rulers. Debal Curry traces its roots to the Goan Vindalho which also features vinegar as an important component inherited from Portuguese culinary traditions. Other popular Kristang dishes include Eurasian Smore (a beef stew) and sugee cake.

== Etymology ==
In the original Kristang, "Debal" means "leftover", as it is often served one or two days after Christmas and made out of leftovers from the Christmas meal. It is now however a regular menu item in Eurasian homes made from fresh ingredients. The similarity of the words debal and devil, probably paired with spiciness of the dish, lead to it being adopted into the English language as "Devil curry". The term "deviled", in reference to food is often used with spicy or zesty food, including foods prepared with mustard as an ingredient.

== See also ==
- Eurasians in Singapore
