= Love cake =

Traditional semolina cake eaten in Sri Lanka

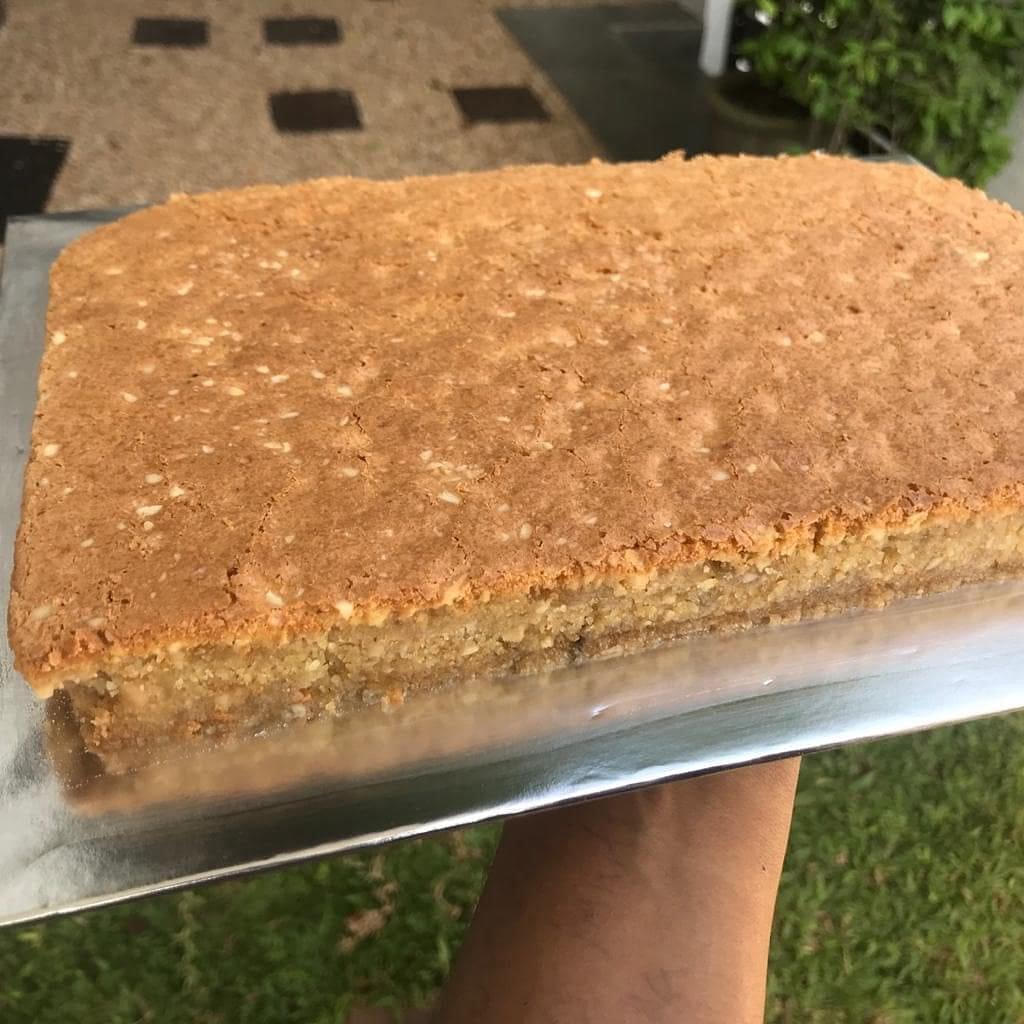
- Alternative names: Bolo di Amor
- Type: Cake
- Place of origin: Sri Lanka
- Region or state: Western Asia and Southern Asia
- Main ingredients: Semolina, Puhul-Ddosi (Pumpkin Preserve), Eggs, Sugar, Butter, Cashews
- Food energy (per serving): Calorie rich
- Similar dishes: Sugee cake

Love cake or Bolo di Amor, is a type of semolina cake eaten in Sri Lanka on special occasions. They are often baked for cultural celebrations such as Christmas, birthdays and weddings, served wrapped in gold paper for guests to eat or take home.

== History ==
The love cake was introduced by the Portuguese but has evolved into a confectionery unique to Sri Lanka. The original recipe of the Sri Lankan love cake dates back to the 16th century, when the Portuguese controlled the coastal areas of the country, known as "Bolo di Amor". The cake incorporates a mix of ingredients from Portuguese cakes, such as semolina, together with local Sri Lankan spices, such as nutmeg, cinnamon and cardamon.

Local folklore is that its name comes from the fact that the grinding of spices and nuts make this cake a true labour of love.

The love cake is similar to the Singaporean sugee cake, which uses almonds as opposed to cashew nuts.

== Characteristics ==
Love cake is made from semolina, cashew nuts, pumpkin preserve, butter, eggs, sugar, and honey flavoured with rose water and a variety of spices, including cinnamon, nutmeg and cardamon, creating a fragrant, sweet, lightly spiced cake with a moist chewy inside and a crunchy exterior.

== See also ==
- Basbousa
- Breudher
