= Portuguese Settlement, Malacca =

Area of Malacca, Malaysia

Saint John's Village Kampung St. John (Malay) Padri sa Chang (Kristang) Aldeia de São João (Portuguese) The Portuguese Settlement
- Neighbourhood of Malacca City
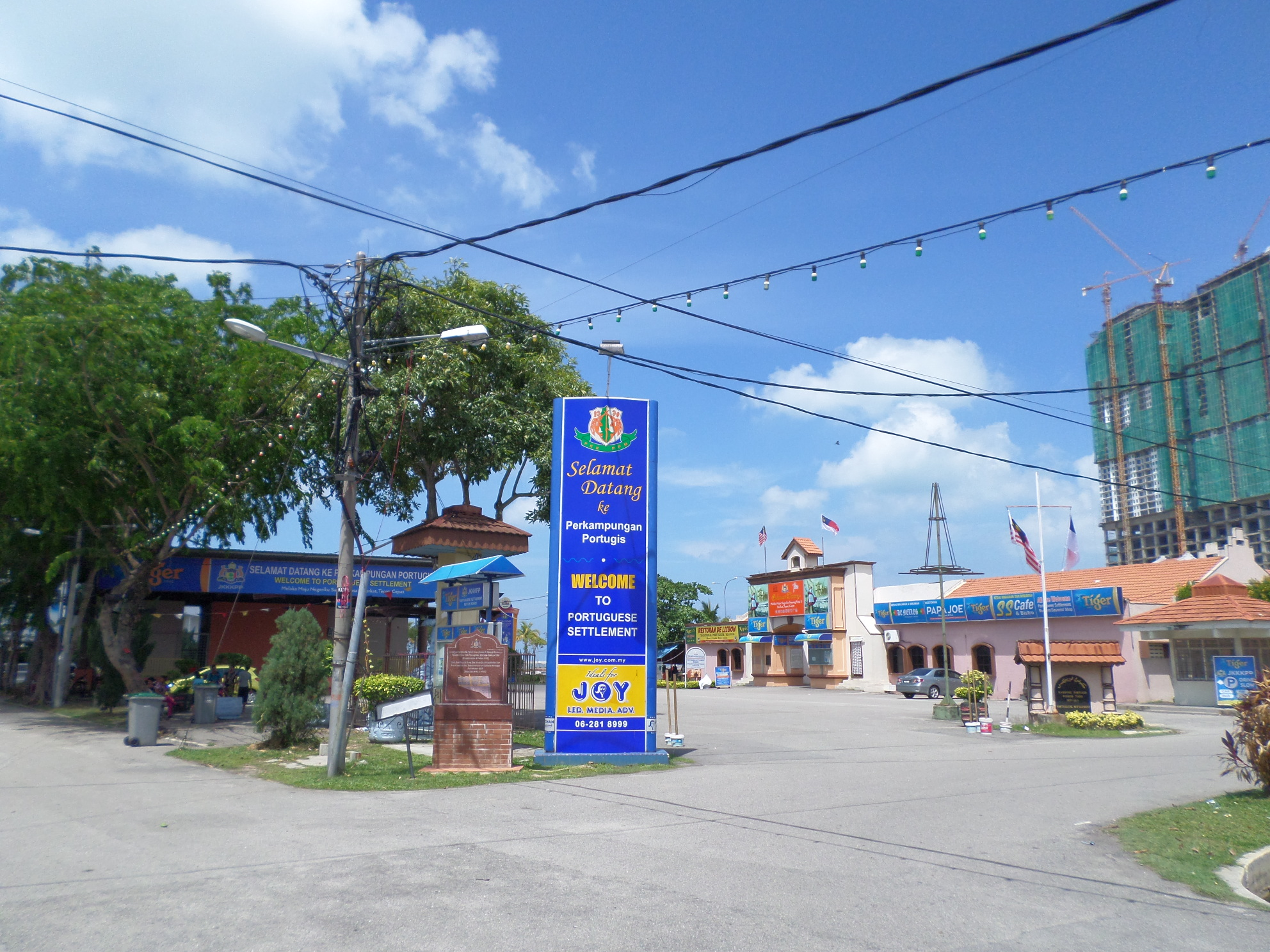
- Portuguese Settlement (Saint John's Village)

- Portuguese Settlement in Malacca Saint John's Village (Peninsular Malaysia) Saint John's Village (Malaysia)
- Coordinates: 02°11′09″N 102°15′57″E
- Country: Malaysia
- State: Malacca
- District: Melaka Tengah
- City: Malacca City
- Time zone: UTC+8 (MYT)
- Postal code: 75050

The Portuguese Settlement (Saint John's Village; Kristang: Padri sa Chang; Portuguese: Aldeia de São João; Malay: Kampung St. John, Kampung Portugis) is a neighbourhood in Ujong Pasir, Malacca City, which serves as a home for the Kristang or Portuguese-Eurasian people of Malacca.

The Kristang people are a Malaysian ethnic group with mixed Portuguese and Malay heritage. The community traces their Portuguese descent to the time of the Portuguese rule of Malacca (1511-1641).

As of 2021, the Portuguese Settlement is estimated to have a population of approximately 1,000 inhabitants.

== Founding of the Settlement ==
The Portuguese Settlement's foundation stone was originally laid in 1926, when the French and Portuguese missionaries Rev J Pier François and Rev A M Coroado decided to build a new settlement in the Ujong Pasir area of Malacca, to accommodate the local Portuguese Eurasian community.

They viewed the settlement as a necessity for the welfare of Malacca's scattered and impoverished Portuguese people. The Settlement's seaside location was also of particular importance, given that most of the Portuguese were fishermen and required homes with access to the beach.

In order to amass funding for the construction of the settlement, Rev François wrote to various prominent members of the Eurasian community in Singapore for aid; among them Dr Noel Leicester Clarke and Claude Henry da Silva.

After negotiations with the Eurasian community of Singapore and the State Government of Malacca, 28 hectares of remote swampland in Ujong Pasir were purchased. The original design of the Settlement provided for 168 homes to be built for the Portuguese.

=== Freehold Status Dispute ===
While the Portuguese Settlement was originally granted freehold land status, this was taken from the Portuguese in 1949 by the British colonial government, owing to the construction of SMK Canossa Convent along Jalan Eradia. As the French mission behind the school was construed as a foreign entity, they were prevented from owning freehold land by the British administration in colonial Malaya. Hence, to resolve this discrepancy, the entire Portuguese Settlement lot was re-gazetted from freehold to state-owned land by the British in 1949.

Since 1949, the Portuguese community has tried numerous times to regain the Settlement's freehold land status, but to no avail.

=== Land Reclamation Issues ===
In 2014, Malaysia's then-Prime Minister Najib Razak announced the Melaka Gateway project, which would involve extensive land reclamation efforts off the coast of the Malacca Straits. The objective of this project was to bring, among other things, a new cruise terminal and deep-water port to the city.

However, this project was opposed by the residents of the Portuguese Settlements. The Portuguese claimed that the land reclamation works would have an adverse effect on the shoreline and habitat diversity of the waters off the coast of the Settlement, which would in turn pose a threat to their "main source of livelihood".

==== Protests Against the Melaka Gateway Project ====
Consequently, in 2018, the Portuguese Settlement's residents staged a protest against the master developers of the Melaka Gateway project, KAJ Development Sdn Bhd. An estimated 200 Portuguese residents brought coffins to the main office of KAJ Development, where several of them laid in the coffins whilst the others sprinkled sand onto them.

In an interview with The Edge, residents of the Settlement also described the Melaka Gateway project as "the developer throwing sand into their rice bowls with the reclamation activities".

Nonetheless, despite their efforts in appealing to both the State Government and the developers, the Portuguese have remained unsuccessful in thwarting the continuation of the Melaka Gateway project.

== Landmarks ==
=== Christ the Redeemer Replica Statue ===
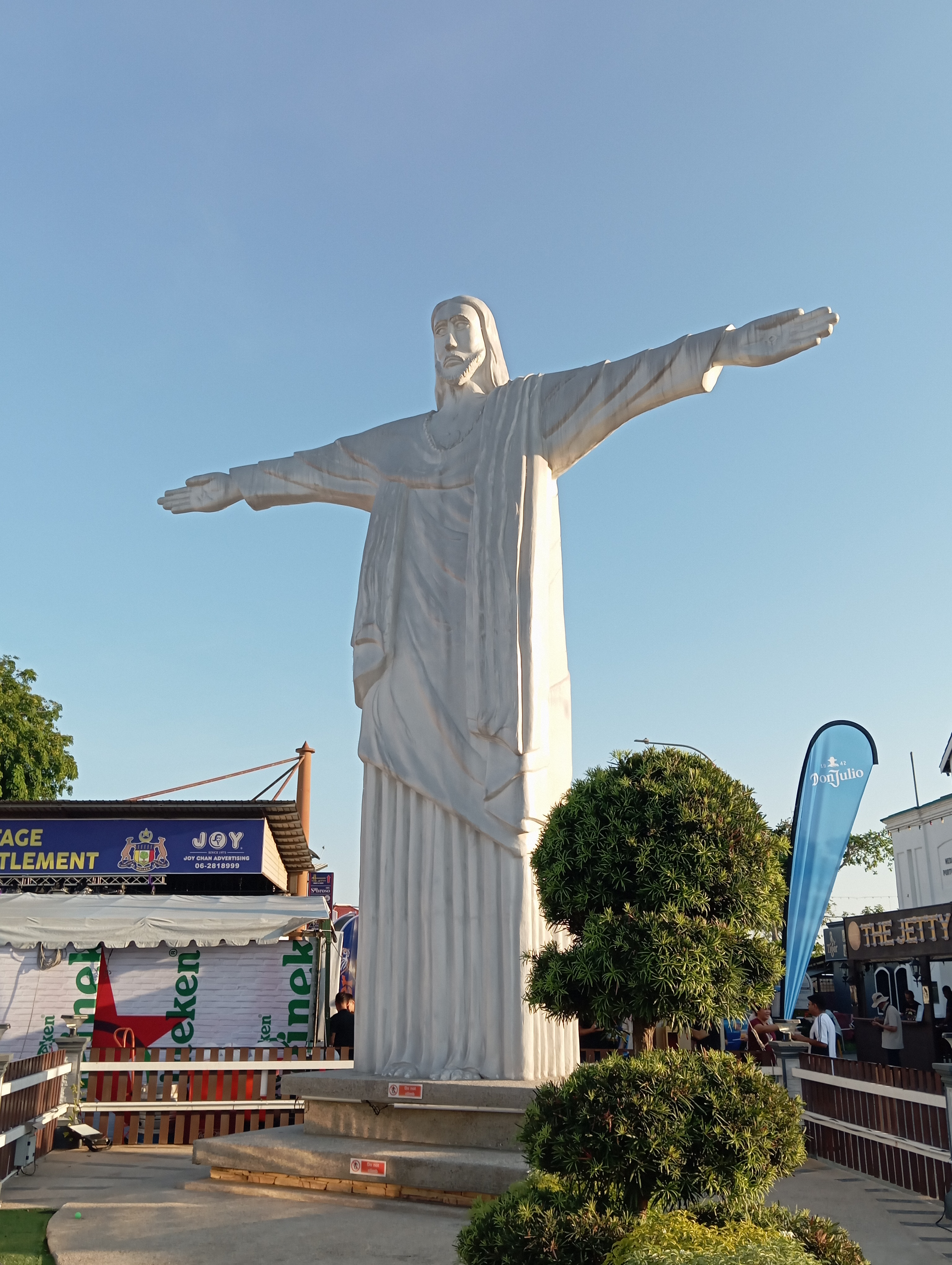
Christ the Redeemer Replica Statue in Portuguese Settlement, Malacca

In 2017, the Portuguese managed to construct a new Christ the Redeemer statue at the entrance of the Portuguese Square along Jalan D'Albuquerque. It is an eight-meter tall replica of the similarly-named Art Deco statue in Rio de Janeiro, Brazil.

The statue is intended not only to signal the Kristang community's membership of the global Roman Catholic faith, but also their "affiliation to the Portuguese-speaking world of the global south".

=== Portuguese Square ===
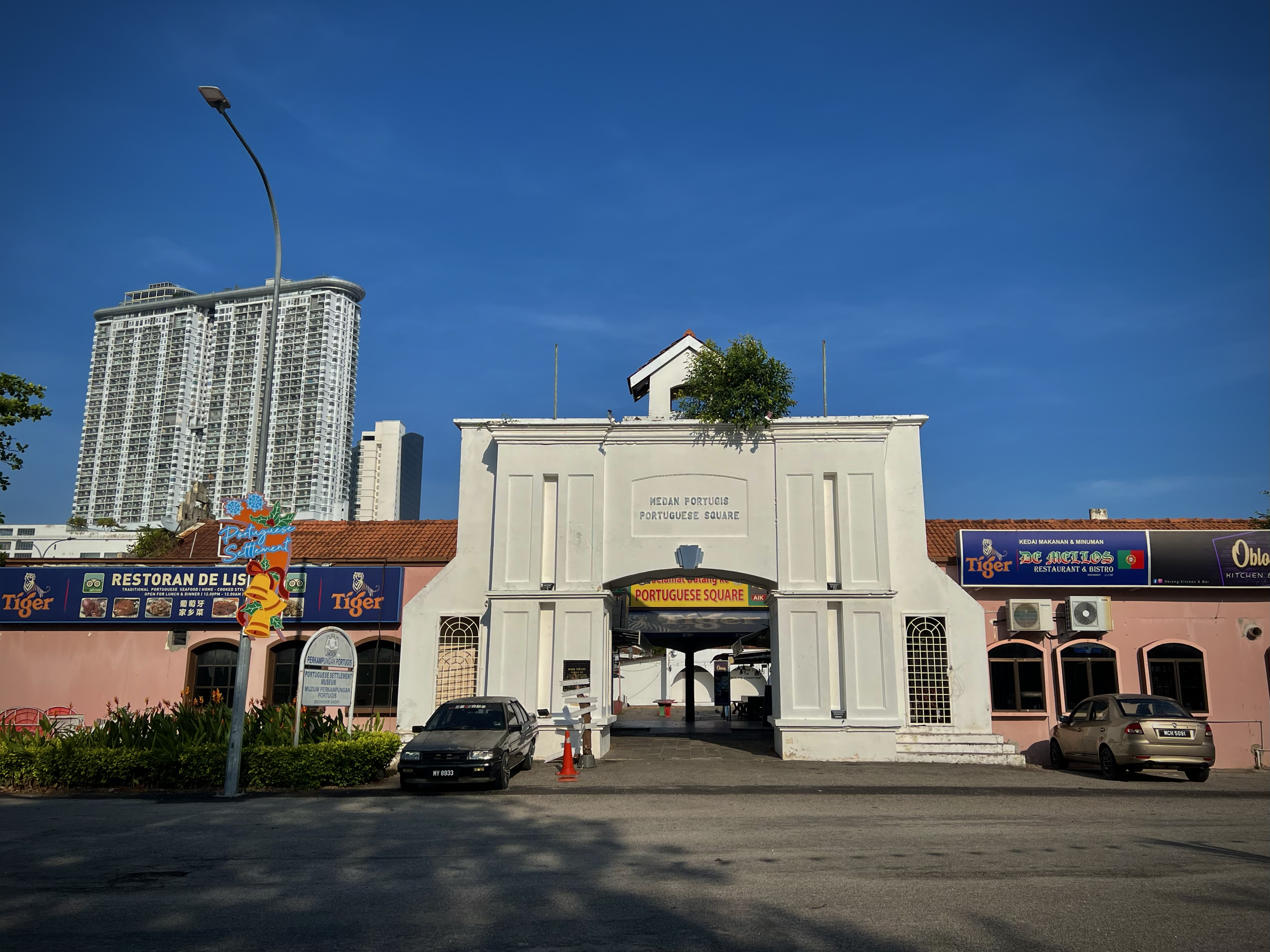
Portuguese Square in Portuguese Settlement, Malacca

The Portuguese Square (Malay: Medan Portugis) was opened by then-Malaysian Prime Minister Mahathir Mohamad on 24 January 1985, as part of the recently launched twin-city tourism development program between Malacca and Lisbon.

The launch of the Portuguese Square enabled the residents to open restaurants selling traditional Portuguese food. Common Portuguese dishes that can be found here include Portuguese Baked Fish and Curry Debal.

=== Road Names ===
Roads in Portuguese Settlement
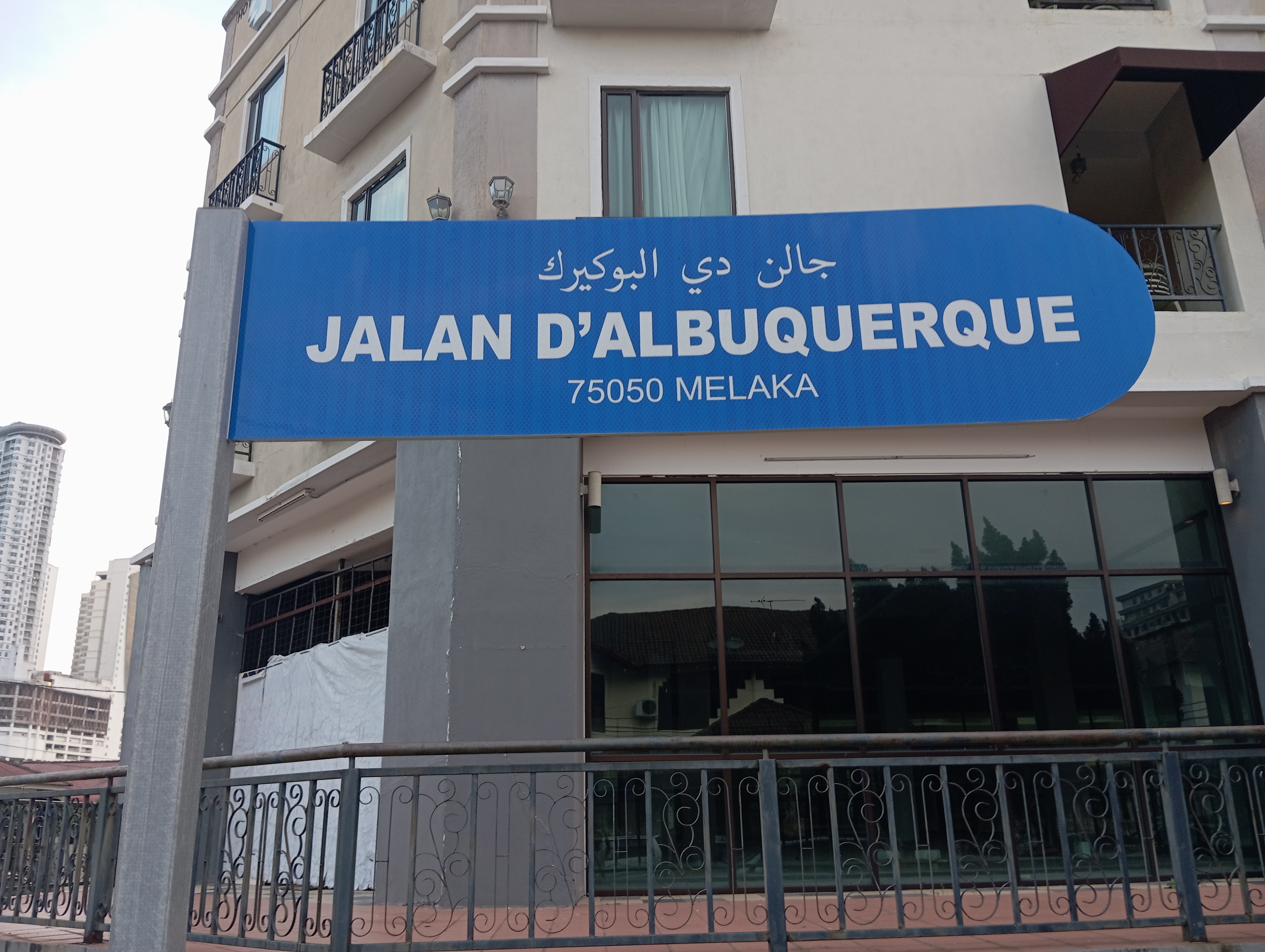
D'Albuquerque Road

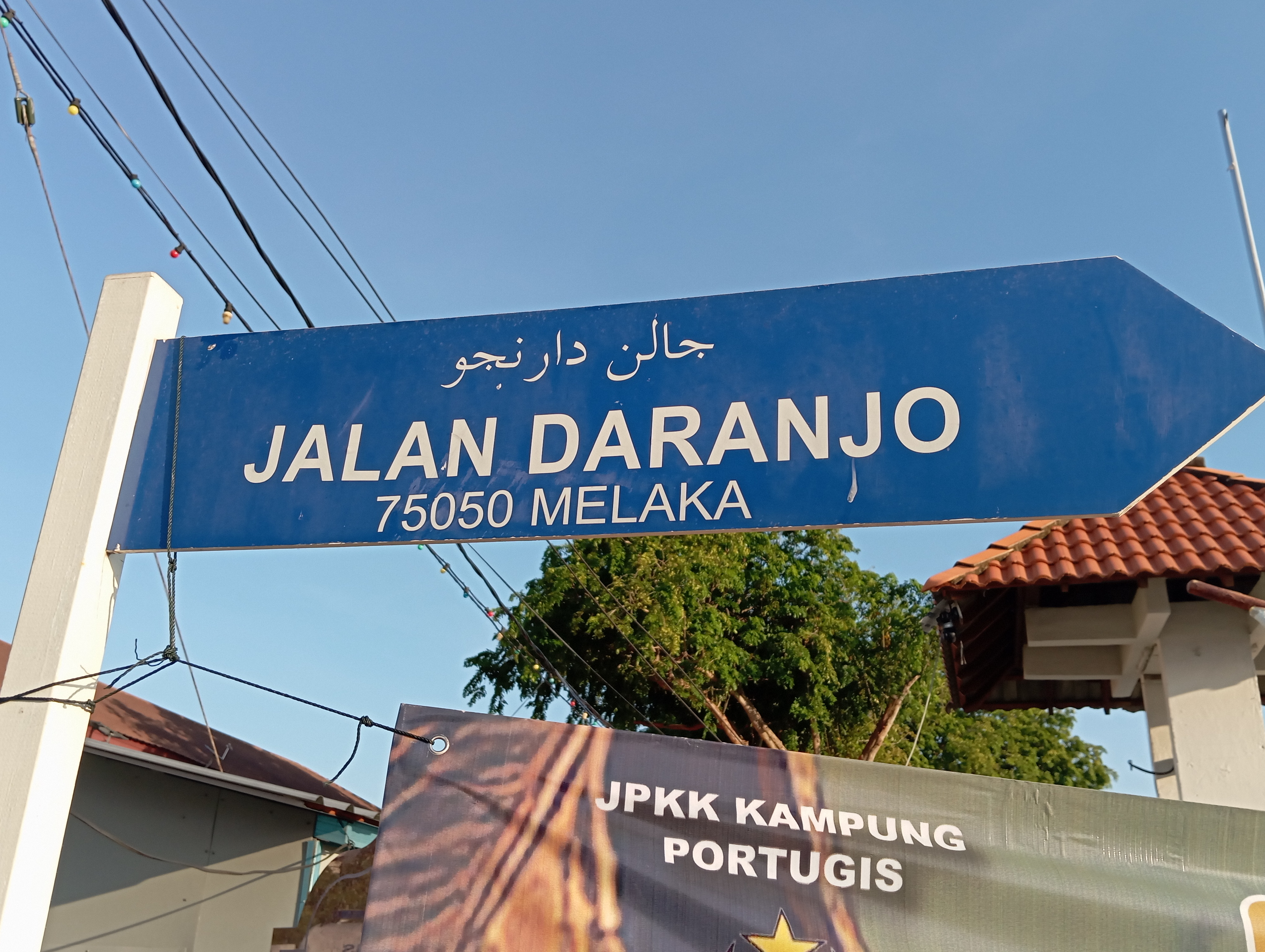
Daranjo Road

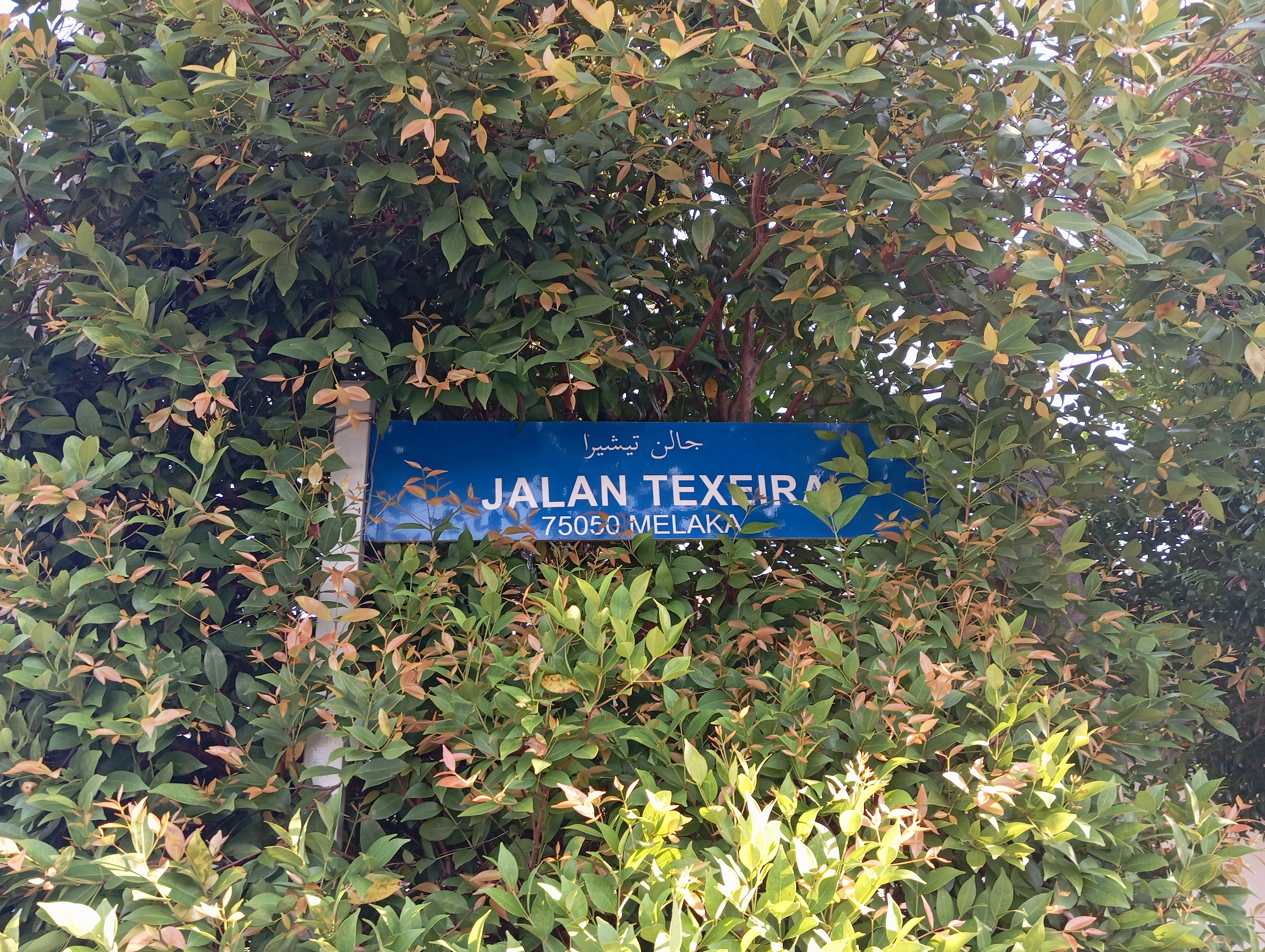
Texeira Road

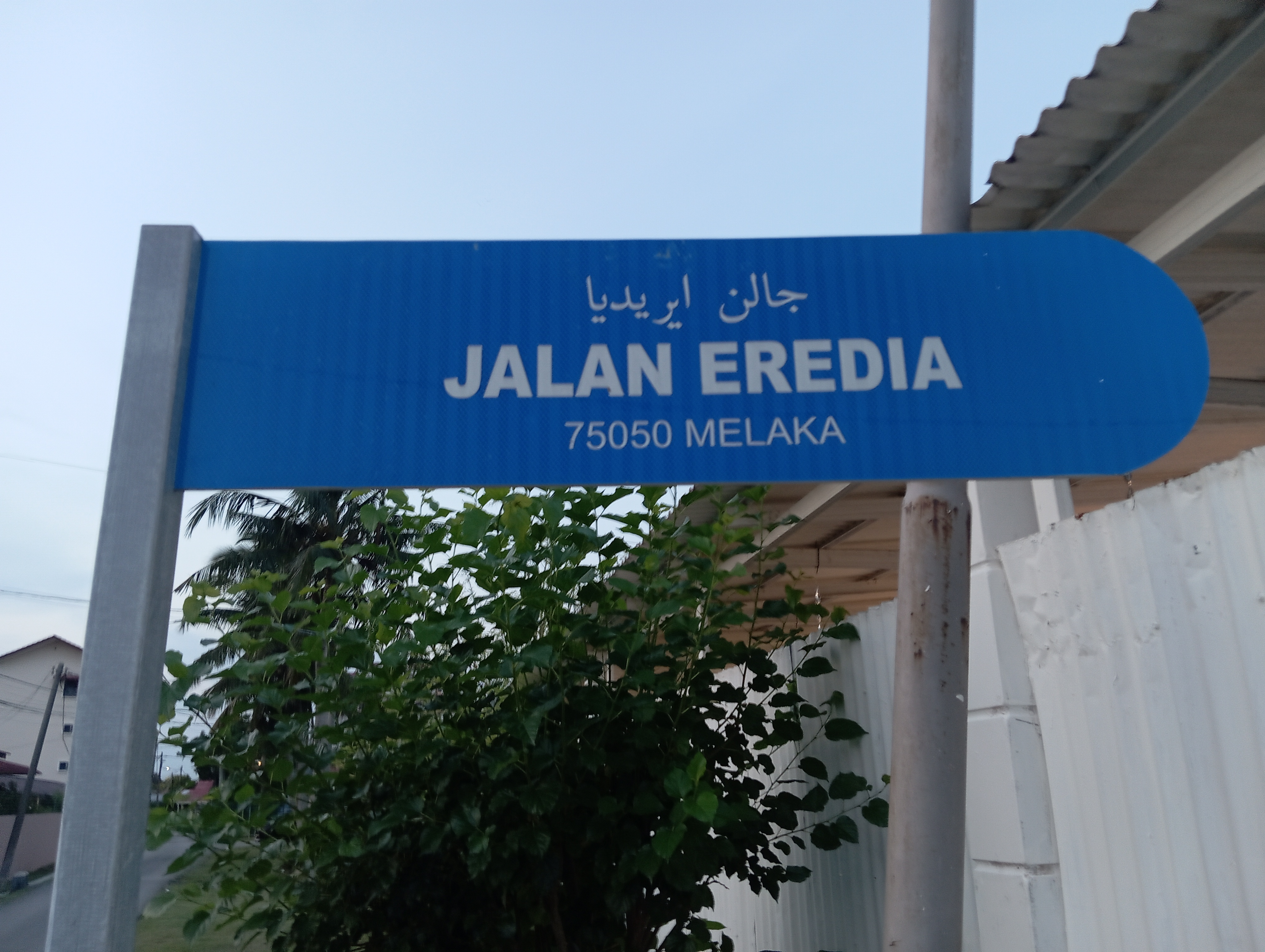
Eredia Road

Roads in the Portuguese Settlement bear the names of Portuguese families such as D'Albuquerque, Teixeira and D'Aranjo, among others. These are intended as a reference to the forefathers of the present-day community, as well as the missionaries who founded the Settlement.

=== The Lisbon Melaka ===
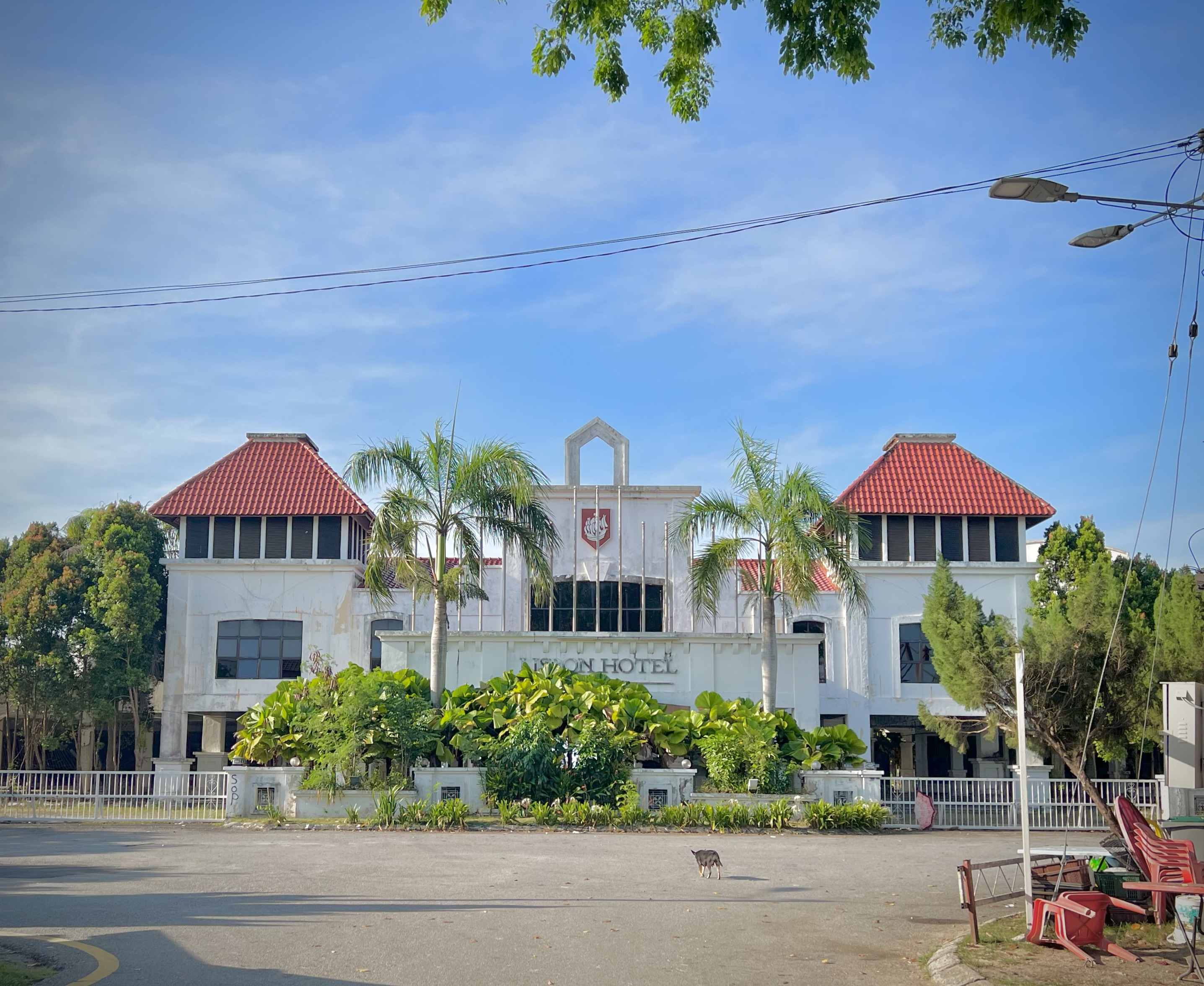
The Lisbon Melaka

Since August 2025, UK-based hotel developer Wyndham Group has opened a new luxury hotel near the coast of the Settlement called The Lisbon Melaka. This hotel occupies the same premises as the former Lisbon Hotel Malacca, which had closed its doors to guests several years prior. As of August 2025, nightly room rates at this hotel appear to range from MYR500 at the lowest, to MYR1,000 or more.

== Attractions and Festivals ==
Like many other Portuguese-speaking communities around the world, the Portuguese Settlement holds a yearly "June festival" that opens with Festa de San Juang ("Feast of Saint John", June 23) and closes with Festa de San Pedro ("Feast of Saint Peter", the fishermen's patron saint, June 29). This festival is attended by about 100,000 visitors from Malaysia and abroad. At the festival one can hear Kristang folk songs and watch dancers in colourful costumes perform to the rhythm of branyu music. An important event in the festival is the blessing of the local fishermen's boats, specially decorated for the occasion, to assure good catch.

Intrudu is also another festival celebrated in the Settlement, and is described as follows by Ei Leen Lee in Language Shift and Revitalisation in the Kristang Community.
