= Dosi =

Dosi may refer to:

- Dosi, a traditional Sri Lankan fruit confectionery
- Giovanni Dosi
- Dushi District
- A slang word for an Orthodox Jew
