= Joan Margaret Marbeck =

Malaysian scholar

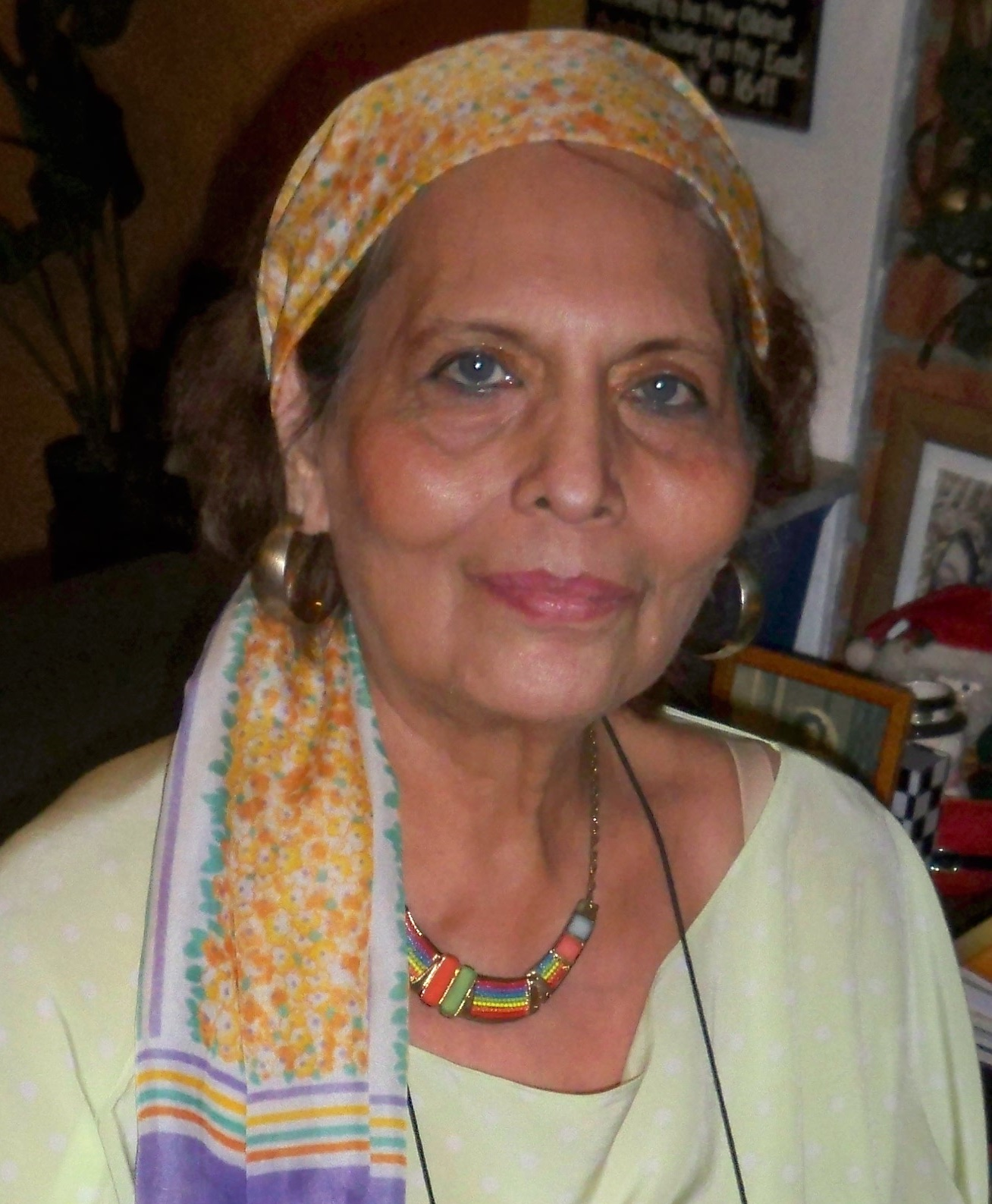
- Born: 26 June 1944; Malacca Town, Malacca, Japanese-occupied Malaya
- Died: 28 July 2024 (aged 80); Seremban, Negeri Sembilan, Malaysia
- Education: Pedagogical College
- Occupations: Teacher, scholar

Joan Margaret Marbeck (26 June 1944, Malacca Town - 28 July 2024, Seremban) was a Malaysian scholar specializing in the study of the Malay-Portuguese creole language, Kristang, in Malaysia and other countries (Singapore, Australia, Macau).

== Biography ==
She received a pedagogical education. In the years 1965–1990, she used to work in a number of schools and colleges in Malaysia.

She took active measures to revive Kristang. She lectured on Kristang at the invitation of a number of world universities and public organizations (Pontifical Catholic University of Rio de Janeiro, 1997, Eurasian Association in Singapore, 2011; University of Malaya, 2014). She published dictionaries and phrase books, translated poetry and songs into this language, tried to introduce Kristang to be studied in primary schools in places where the Creole population lives, especially in Malacca.

She was an organizer of the conference "On the Conservation and Development of the Malayo-Portuguese Creole Language and Heritage in Malaysia" (January 1996), the initiator of the establishment in 2010 a department of the life of the Eurasian community in the Peoples Museum Melaka, the holding of a seminar on Kristang in cooperation with the Corporation of Malacca Museums in December 2011 and the International Conference on Creole Languages in June 2012 in Malacca (in cooperation with the Federal University of Rio de Janeiro).

In conjunction with the 500th anniversary of the conquest of Malacca by Portuguese (1511) she produced and published in 2012 a set of three books: "The Commemorative Dictionary of Serani", "Speak Serani" and "Serani Songs". Earlier, Kristang was called Serani, and Joan Marbeck believed that it was necessary to return that name. In Kuala Lumpur, in 2014, she opened courses to study the Kristang.

Having musical education, he wrote musicals too. In 1994, she was invited to write and stage the musical "Saint Francis Xavier - the main saint of India" in conjunction with the centenary of the Church of St. Francis Xavier in Malacca In 2009, she wrote and presented to the competition of the Lusophone Festival in Macau a monoplay in Kristang 'Seng Marianne' (Without Marianne). In December 2010, in Kuala Lumpur with the sponsorship of the Brazilian Embassy, her musical "Kazamintu na Praiya" (A Wedding on the Beach) in Kristang was staged.

She was a Member of the Eurasian Association of Selangor and the Federal Territory, the Malacca Portuguese-Eurasian Association, the Malacca Theater Group.

== Rewards ==
- A letter of gratitude from UNESCO for the contribution to the Economics of Heritage UNESCO Conference in Penang and Malacca (9-16 May 1999).
- The title of "The Stunning Woman of Malaysia" and "The Kristang Poet of Malacca" (Digi Telecommunications, 2007)

== Publications ==
- Joan Margaret Marbeck. "Experiencia unga Kristang na Malaka" - "Papia (Language)", Vol.3 No.2 1994;
- Joan Margaret Marbeck. Ungua Adanza (Heritage). Lisbon: Calouste Gulbenkian Foundation, 1995;
- Joan Margaret Marbeck. "Kristang or Standard Portuguese as Pupils Own Language in Malaysian Schools" - Proceedings of the Conference "A Revival of Spoken Kristang and the Development of the Malacca-Portuguese Heritage". 7 January 1996 at the Straits Heritage Lodge. Melaka, Malaysia;
- Joan Margaret Marbeck. Kristang Phrasebook: a Revival and Understanding of the Malaysian-Portuguese Creole. Lisbon: Calouste Gulbenkian Foundation, 2004;
- Joan Margaret Marbeck (translation). «Joan Yo buskas Seu». - Abdullah Ahmad Badawi. Ku Cari Damai Abadi. I Seek Eternal Peace. In 80 Languages. Advisor Dato 'Dr. Ahmad Kamal Abdullah. Editor Assoc. Professor Dr. Victor A. Pogadaev. Kuala Lumpur: University of Malaya, 2008, p. 51;
- Joan Margaret Marbeck. Linggu Mai (Mother tongue). Lisbon: Calouste Gulbenkian Foundation, 2004;
- Joan Margaret Marbeck. Bersu Serani (Songs of Serani). 2012;
- Joan Margaret Marbeck. Kristang Phrasebook. 2012;
- Joan Margaret Marbeck. Commemorative Bahasa Serani Dictionary. 2012;
- Joan Margaret Marbeck. The Speech & Song CD. 2012.
- Joan Margaret Marbeck (translation). "Kung Poesia Yo" - Taufiq Ismail. Dengan Puisi Aku. 1 Puisi, 80 Bahasa, 80 Tahun. Terjemahan Puisi dalam 58 Bahasa Dunia dan 22 Bahasa Daerah (Taufiq Iamail. With Poetry, I. One poem, 80 languages, 80 years. Translation of the poem in 58 world languages and 22 regional languages). Prakata Prof. Victor A. Pogadaev. Jakarta: Horison, 2015, p. 34. ISSN 0125-9016
- Joan Margaret Marbek, Victor Pogadaev. Kristang-Russian Dictionary (About 4000 words). Papiah Kristang-Russio Dictionario (Approximo 4000 palabra). Moscow: Klyuch-S, 2016, 88 p. ISBN 978-5-906751-70-6.
