= Eric Paine =

Singaporean footballer

Eric Thomas Paine is a Singaporean former national football team player in the position of goalkeeper. He is widely considered to be one of the best goalkeepers Singapore ever had. He first played for the national team in 1968.

Paine, a Eurasian, studied in Victoria School.

In 1967, Paine, who in the national youth team, was called up for training with the national team after the national team goalkeeper, Wilfred Skinner, was dropped from the centralised training. He was subsequently dropped from the training.

Paine eventually took over the goalkeeper position from Skinner.

He played in 1975 Asian Cup tournament and suffered an injury against the North Korea national football team.

An injury relegated him to second-choice in 1977 and Edmund Wee replaced him as the first choice goalkeeper. He subsequently retired from the national team in 1978.
