= Putugal =

Eurasian dessert

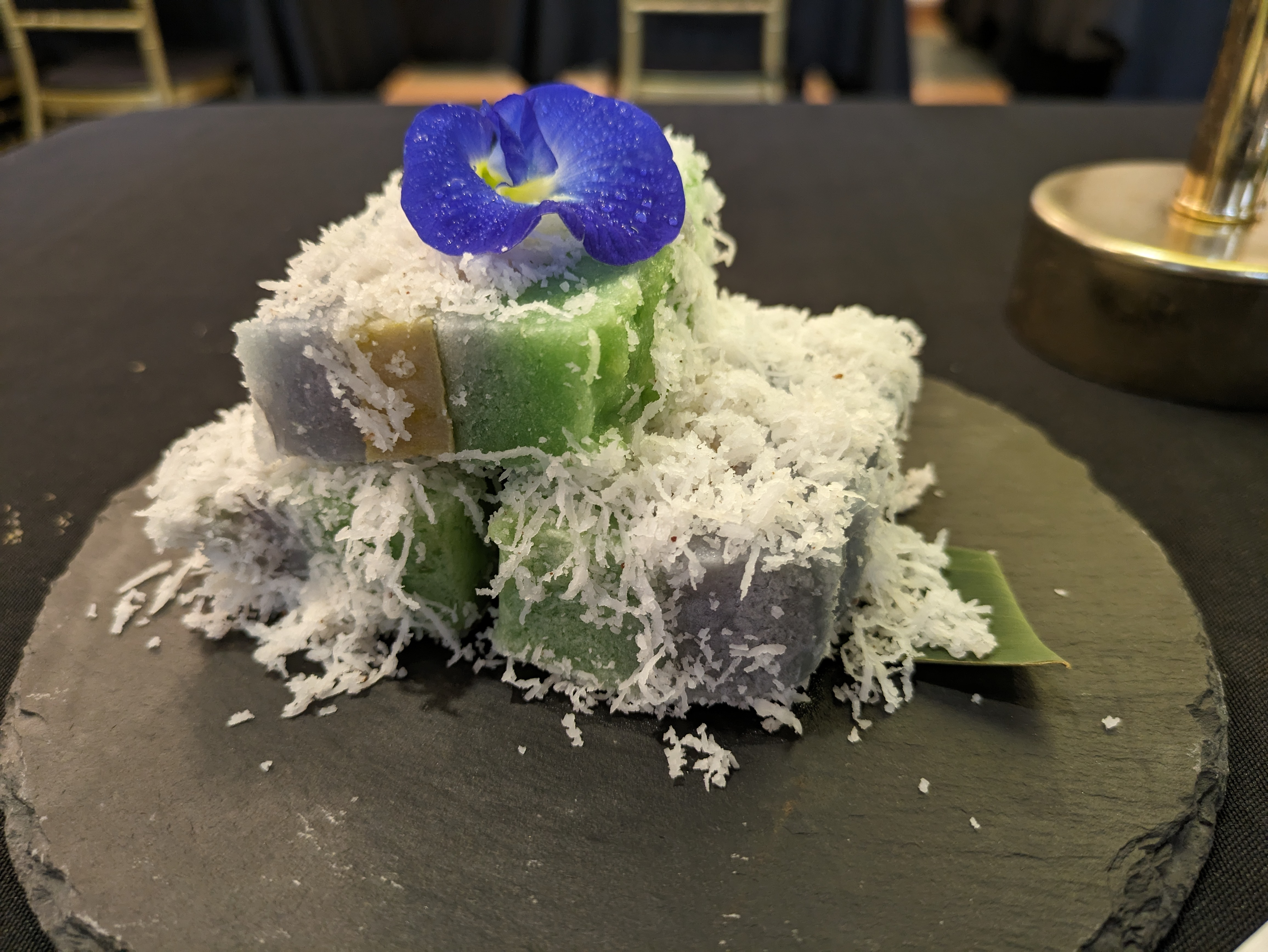
- Alternative names: kuih putugal, kuih Portugal
- Type: Dessert
- Place of origin: Malaysia, Singapore
- Region or state: Southeast Asia
- Created by: Eurasians
- Main ingredients: Tapioca, grated coconut, sugar, banana

Putugal, also known as kuih putugal or kuih Portugal, is a Eurasian steamed rice cake or kuih that appears in all the former Portuguese territories of Asia. Putugal is typically made from rice or tapioca flour traditionally colored blue using the butterfly pea flower, stuffed with ripened banana and garnished with grated coconut. Among Eurasians, the dessert is a staple during festive celebrations such as Christmas.

== See also ==
- Eurasians in Singapore
