= Sugee cake =

Type of cake

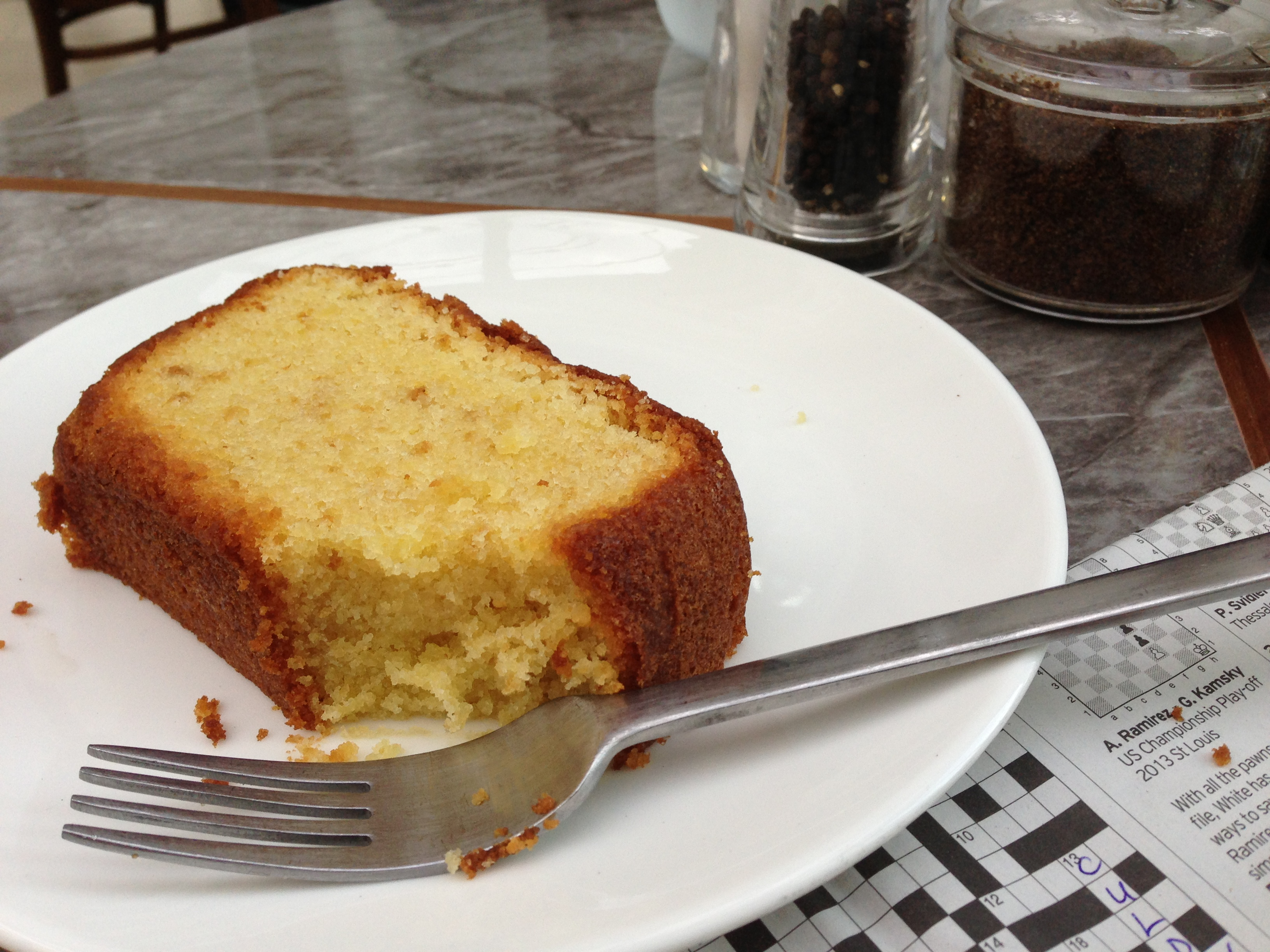
- A Sugee cake in Singapore
- Type: Dessert
- Place of origin: Malacca, Malaysia
- Region or state: Southeast Asia
- Created by: Kristang people
- Main ingredients: semolina, butter, eggs, and brandy
- Similar dishes: Sanwin makin, sooji halwa

Sugee cake is a cake made of semolina and almonds, creamed butter, eggs, and brandy, and optionally covered in marzipan and royal icing. The cake is typically baked during festive occasions and holidays like Christmas, by members of Malaccan Portuguese in Malacca and the larger Eurasian community in Malaysia and Singapore. The word sugee has its origins in Hindustani word for 'semolina' (सूजी). Sugee cake is similar to the Sri Lankan Love cake baked during Christmas by the Eurasian Burgher people, which uses cashew as opposed to almonds.[9]

In 2020, Shake Shack adapted the flavor of the sugee cake in a limited edition milkshake, dubbed "sugee boogie."

== See also ==
- Kristang people
- Eurasians in Singapore
