= Kristang people =

Ethnic group of Malaysia and Singapore

Kristang people Jenti Kristang / Orang Serani
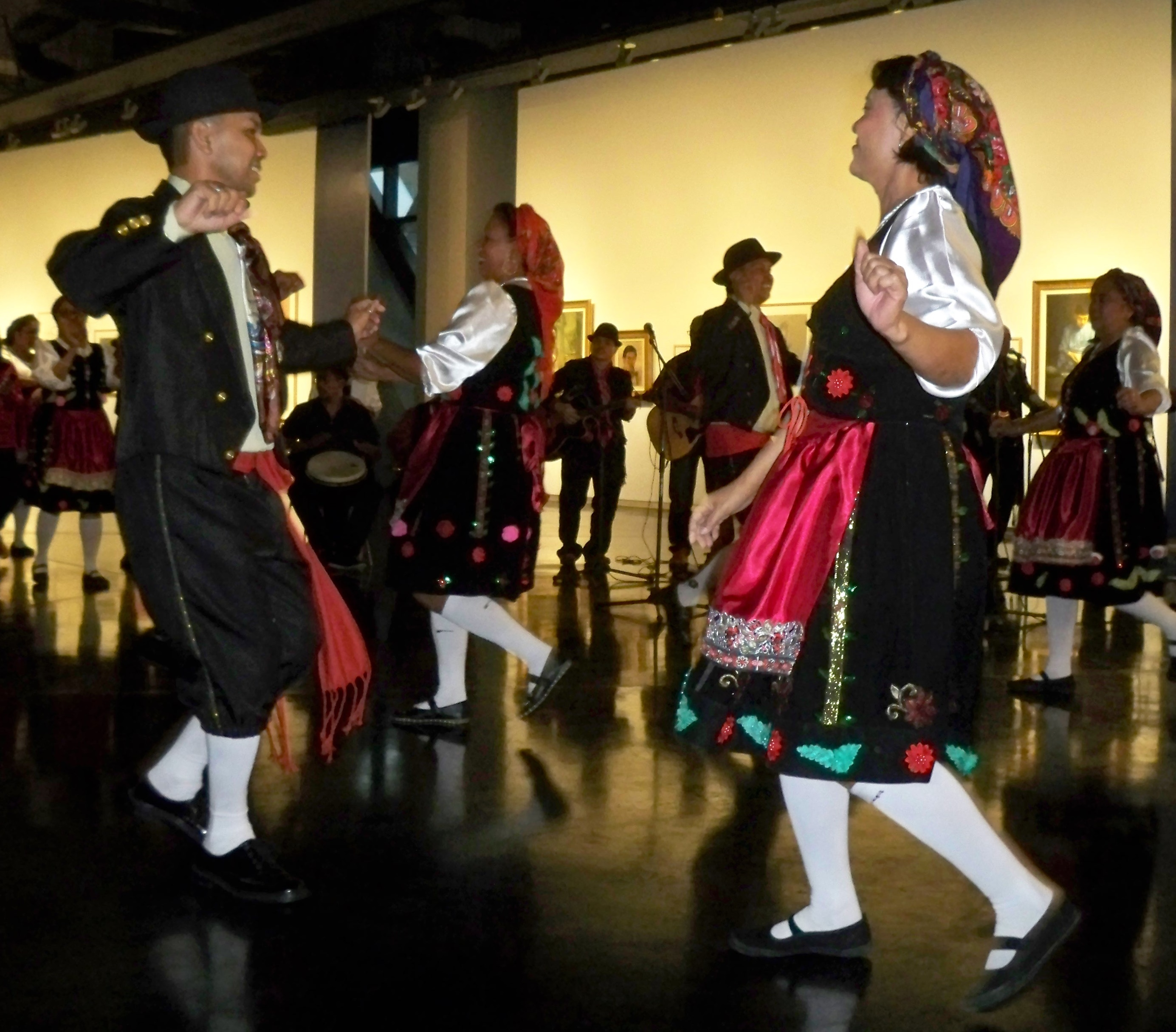
- A group of Kristang people performing a traditional dance in Malacca, Malaysia.

Total population
- 37,000

Regions with significant populations
- Malaysia (West); Singapore; Australia (Perth); Minority in: Canada and United Kingdom

Languages
- Papia Kristang, English, Malay

Religion
- Predominantly; Christianity (Roman Catholic); Minorities; Judaism · Atheism

Related ethnic groups
- Eurasian Singaporeans, Mardijker, Goan Catholics, Portuguese diaspora, Bumiputera, Jews, Macanese people

The Kristang or the Serani, sometimes also known as Portuguese–Eurasians or Malaccan–Portuguese, are a creole ethnic group of people of primarily Portuguese and Malay descent, with substantial Chinese and Indian ancestry. They originated in Malaya, which consists of modern-day Malaysia and Singapore. Significant emigration in the second half of the twentieth century also led to a post-war diaspora in Australia. In addition to Malay and Portuguese roots, many Kristang people share Dutch ancestry due to frequent intermarriage. Furthermore, because of persecution by the Portuguese Inquisition in the region, a significant portion of the Jews of Malacca assimilated into the Kristang community.

The creole group arose in Portuguese Malacca (modern-day Malacca) between the 16th and 17th centuries, when the city was a port and base of the Portuguese Empire. Today the Malaysian government classifies them as Portuguese–Eurasians; in Singapore, they are primarily known as Kristang. Today, elements of Kristang culture and identity, especially the Kristang language, which is classified as critically endangered by the UNESCO Red Book of Endangered Languages, are currently undergoing cultural and language revitalisation in both Malaysia and Singapore. The current Regedor or Headman of the Portuguese Settlement of Malacca, the original, geographical, cultural and spiritual centre of the Malacca Portuguese identity, is Oliver Lopez.

Scholars believe the Kristang community originated in part from liaisons and marriages between Portuguese men (sailors, soldiers, traders, etc.) and local native women. The men came to Malacca during the age of Portuguese explorations, and in the early colonial years, Portuguese women did not settle in the colony. Nowadays intermarriage occurs more frequently between Kristang and people of Chinese and Indian ethnicity rather than Malay because of endogamous religious laws. These require non-Muslims intending to marry Malay-Muslims first to convert to Islam. Eurasians are not always willing to alter their religious and cultural identity in this way. In earlier centuries, Portuguese and local Malays were able to marry without such conversions, because religious laws were not enforced. Today, the Malay language, or Bahasa Melayu, has changed to incorporate many Kristang words. For example, garfu (Portuguese: garfo) is Kristang for "fork" and almari (Portuguese: armário) is Kristang for "wardrobe"; the Malay language incorporated these Kristang words whole.

The name "Kristang" is sometimes incorrectly used for other people of mixed European and Asian descent presently living in Malaysia and Singapore. This includes people of Portuguese descent who were not part of the historical Kristang community, and people with other European ancestry, such as Dutch or British. The name comes from the Portuguese creole Kristang (Christian), derived from the Portuguese Cristão. A derogatory term for the Malacca Portuguese community was Grago or Gragok (slang term for Portuguese camarão (shrimp), referring to the fact that the Portuguese Malaccans were traditionally shrimp fishermen). In the native tongue, they also call themselves Gente Kristang (Christian people).

== History ==
=== Portuguese colonization ===
Malacca was a major destination in the great wave of sea expeditions launched by Portugal around the turn of the 16th century. It eventually was controlled as part of the Portuguese Empire. The first Portuguese expedition to reach Malacca landed in 1507. The Sejarah Melayu (Malay Annals) noted that the Malays first called them Bengali Puteh (White Bengalis), as the Portuguese brought to mind traders from Bengal (due to their appearance and possibly the sound of their language, which was in fact distantly related) but were more pale skinned. In the early years, the Malays called the Portuguese Serani (a Malay contraction of the Arabic Nasrani, meaning followers of Jesus the Nazarene). A story was recorded that the Portuguese landing party inadvertently insulted the Malaccan sultan by placing a garland of flowers on his head, and he had them detained. In 1511, a Portuguese fleet came from India to free the landing party and conquer Malacca.

At that time, Portuguese women were barred from travelling overseas due to superstition about women on ships, as well as the substantial danger of the sea route around Cape of Good Hope. Following the Portuguese colonization of Malacca (Malaysia) in 1511, the Portuguese government encouraged their explorers to marry local indigenous women, under a policy set by Afonso de Albuquerque, then Viceroy of India. To promote settlement, the King of Portugal granted freeman status and exemption from Crown taxes to Portuguese men (known as casados, or "married men") who ventured overseas and married local women. With Albuquerque's encouragement, mixed marriages flourished and some 200 were recorded by 1604. By creating families, the Portuguese men would make more settled communities, with families whose children would be Catholic and loyal to the Crown.

=== The Dutch takeover ===
A powerful sea power, the rising Dutch nation took Malacca from the Portuguese in 1641. This coincided with the Portuguese Restoration War in Portugal that ended the 60-year Iberian Union (1580–1640), when the crown of Portugal was joined with the crown of Spain by personal union. Almost all political contact between Portugal and Malacca ended, and a large number of people of Portuguese descent in the city were evacuated to Batavia (now Jakarta), the Dutch East India Company headquarters, as war captives, where they settled in an area called Kampung Tugu. Portuguese trade relations with the former colonial outpost of Macau (China) have continued to this day.

Even after Portugal lost Malacca in 1641, the Kristang community largely preserved its traditions, practicing Catholicism and using the Portuguese language within the community. Some Dutch (crypto-)Catholics were also absorbed into the community during this time.

== Present status ==
The Kristang community still has cultural and linguistic continuities with today's Portugal, especially with the Minho region, from where many early settlers emigrated. The Kristang continue to hold some church services in Portuguese, and Malaysians, including themselves, often refer to the community as "Portuguese". As the Kristang language is not taught in schools, it is nearing extinction, with the exception of within Malacca's Portuguese Settlement in Ujong Pasir. This settlement is a thriving Kristang community, established in 1933 with the goal of gathering the dispersed Kristang community and preserving their culture. A simple village of poor fishermen for many decades, it has recently become a major tourist attraction. This has helped to improve the income of the Kristang population.

The Kristang people in Malaysia do not have full bumiputera status, a status which applies to indigenous ethnic groups. However, they have been given the privilege to apply to be members of a trust scheme known as Amanah Saham Bumiputera, a privilege shared by Malaysians of Thai descent. The state sponsored this program to help the Malays increase their participation in the national economy. The Kristang community in Singapore is part of a larger umbrella group, known generically as the Eurasian community. Some members have emigrated to Perth, Western Australia, over the past three decades.

== Culture ==
=== Fishing ===
Since Portuguese times, the Kristang have been living by the sea. It is still an important part of their culture. Even today, with only 10 percent of the community earning their living by fishing, many men go fishing to supplement their income or just to relax with their neighbours. Traditionally men fish from small wooden perahus, or by pushing the langgiang, a traditional bamboo-poled shrimp net through the shallows.

=== Music and dance ===
Kristang traditional music and dance, such as the Branyo and the Farrapeira are descendants of Portuguese folk dances. The Branyo, descends from the southern Portuguese folk dance Corridinho, and can be easily mistaken for the Malay Joget dance, which is believed to have developed from the Branyo. The adoption of western music instruments and musical scales by traditional Malay and Indian orchestras suggests a strong Portuguese influence. The most popular branyo tune, Jingkli Nona, is regarded as the unofficial "anthem" for Portuguese Eurasians.

=== Cuisine ===
Kristang or Malacca Portuguese cuisine consists of heavy local influence, with the additions of stews and the inclusion of pork and seafood in the diet, and rice is the staple food. Among the many dishes in Kristang cuisine, the most popular is cari debal. Other popular delicacies include Portuguese grilled fish, pineapple prawn curry, cari seccu (dry curry), caldu pescador (fisherman's soup), sambal chili bedri (green chilli sambal), soy limang, Porku Tambrinyu (pork tamarind stew), achar pesi (fish pickle), pang su si (su si bun), and sugee cake. As is the custom, Kristang people commonly eat using their hands instead of utensils. It is similar to the Eurasian cuisine of Singapore and Malaysia.

=== Names ===
The Kristang people traditionally used Portuguese and Christian first names, while their surnames were Portuguese.

== Religion ==
In general the Kristang practice Roman Catholicism. Christmas (Natal) is the most festive occasion of the year, when many Kristang families get together to celebrate by eating seasonal dishes, singing carols and branyok, and revelling in saudadi. Like many other Portuguese-speaking Catholic communities around the world, the Kristang also celebrate a string of major Saints' days at the end of June, beginning with St. John (San Juang) on 24 June and closing with St. Peter (San Pedro), the fishermen's patron saint, on 29 June. The June festival of St. John's village is a major tourist attraction of Malacca. Tourists come to observe the festivities, which are religiously based. Besides that, there are also a minority of former Kristang Christians who had rediscovered their Sephardic Jewish roots and returned to Judaism. This led to the establishment of the Kristang Community for Cultural Judaism (KCCJ) in 2010 which is no longer in operation due to political reasons.

== Portuguese influence on Malay language ==
The Portuguese ruled Malacca from 1511 to 1641. About 300 Portuguese words were adopted in the Malay language. These include:

- kereta (from carreta, car);
- sekolah (from escola, school);
- bendera (from bandeira, flag);
- mentega (from manteiga, butter);
- keju (from queijo, cheese);
- gereja (from igreja, church);
- meja (from mesa, table); and
- nanas (from ananás, pineapple).
- tuala (from toalha); and
- sabun (from sabão);

== See also ==
- Anglo-Burmese people - ethnic group from Myanmar
- Bombay East Indians - ethnic group from Mumbai, India
- Burgher people - ethnic group from Sri Lanka
- Filipino mestizo - ethnic group from the Philippines
- Indo people - ethnic group from Indonesia
- Macanese people - ethnic group from Macau usually with some Portuguese ancestry
