= Dosi (food) =

Sri Lankan confectionery

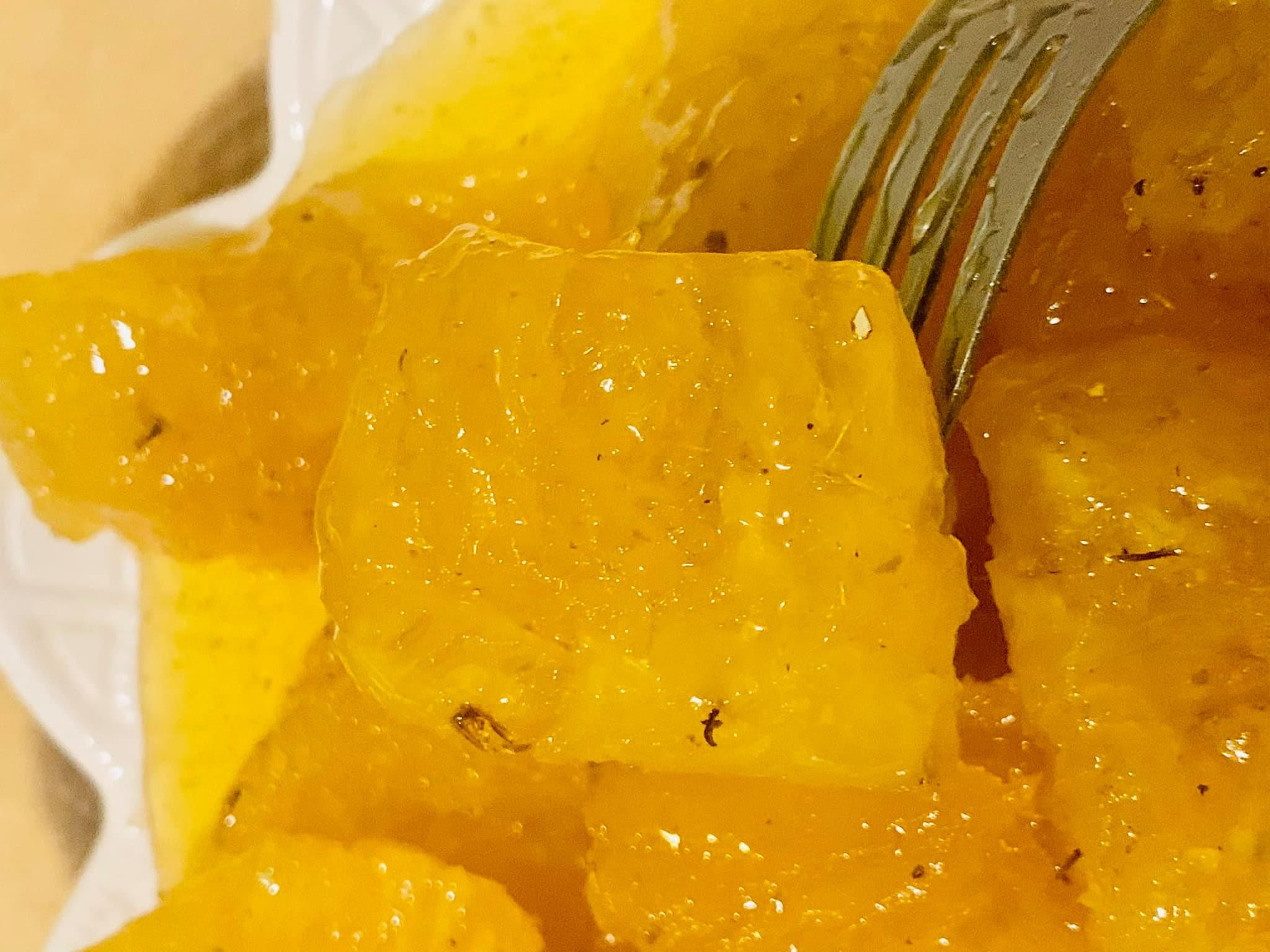
- Annasi Dosi (Pineapple dosi)
- Type: sweetmeat or confectionery
- Place of origin: Sri Lanka
- Associated cuisine: Sri Lanka
- Main ingredients: fruit
- Ingredients generally used: sugar, water
- Variations: cardamom, cinnamon, rose essence

Dosi (Sinhala: දෝසි, Tamil: தோசி) is a traditional Sri Lankan confectionery, similar in nature to fruit preserves or candied fruit. The dish is prepared by boiling segmented fruit in sugar and allowing it to cool in order for the sugar to crystallise on both the surface and the inside of the fruit. Dosi are traditionally served as a snack, during the day or after a meal. It is a dish that is commonly served by Sri Lankan Malays as a part of traditional Eid al-Fitr celebrations, marking the end of Ramadan. It is also popular during weddings, religious festivals and other social functions and celebrations. Variations include the addition of cardamom and/or cinnamon and/or rose essence.

The most popular version is the sweet light yellow puhul-dosi (Sinhala: පුහුල් දොසි), which is made from wintermelon (ash pumpkin). Other versions include inguru-dosi (Sinhala: ඉගුරු දෝසි), made of ginger; pol-dosi (Sinhala: පොල් ටොෆි), made from coconut; annasi-dosi or annāsikā-dosi (Sinhala: අන්නාසි දොසි), made of pineapple; ambarella-dosi (Sinhala: ඇඹරැල්ලා දෝසි), made of ambarella (june plum); amba-dosi or mānga-dosi (Sinhala: අඹ දෝසි), made from mango; ala-dosi (Sinhala: අල දෝසි), made from potatoes; kiri-dosi (Sinhala: කිරි දෝසි) made of milk; apple dosi; jambu-dosi (Sinhala: ජම්බු දෝසි), made of java plum; ambarelikā-dosi, made with hog plum; nelli-dosi, made from gooseberries; biling-dosi; lovi-dosi (Sinhala: ලොවි දෝසි), made from batoko fruit (commonly known in Sri Lanka as lovi-lovi); rambutan-dosi (Sinhala: රඹුටන් දෝසි) made from rambutan; and banana-dosi or kesel-dosi (Sinhala: කෙසෙල් දෝසි).

In Portuguese, doçe simply means ‘sweet’, which is derived from the Latin dolce and the Sinhalese derivative is 'dosi'. It is generally considered that this dish had its origins in the Lusitania region and was brought to the country by Portuguese sailors, who devised this method of preserving fruit for long sea journeys. Boiling the fruit in a sugar syrup effectively stops micro-organisms that spoil fruit by drawing off water from their cells or destroying them by desiccation.

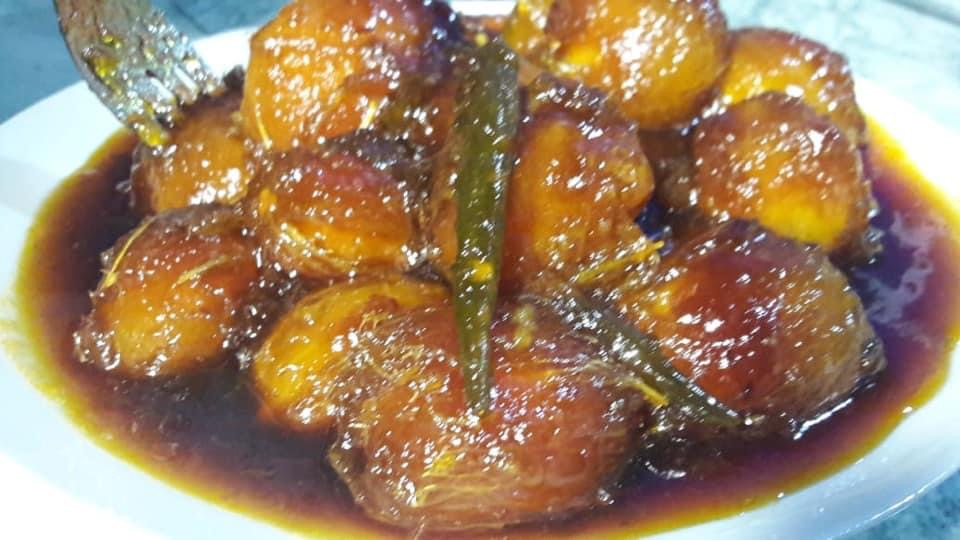
Ambarella Dosi (june plum dosi)

== See also ==
- Petha
