= Kristang language =

Creole language spoken in Malaysia and Singapore

Papia Kristang
- Malaccan (Creole) Portuguese
- Kristang
- Native to: Malaysia, Singapore
- Native speakers: 2,200 (2007)
- Language family: Portuguese Creole: Malayo-Portuguese Creole; Papia Kristang

Language codes
- ISO 639-3: mcm
- Glottolog: None mala1533 Malacca–Batavia Creole
- ELP: Malaccan Creole Portuguese
- Linguasphere: 51-AAC-aha
- Kristang is classified as Severely Endangered by the UNESCO Atlas of the World's Languages in Danger.

Papia Kristang also known as Malaccan (Creole) Portuguese, or simply as Kristang, is a creole language spoken by the Kristang, a community of people of mixed Portuguese and indigenous Malay ancestry, chiefly in Malaysia (Malacca), Singapore and Perth, Western Australia.

In Malacca, the language is also called Cristão, Portugues di Melaka ('Malacca Portuguese'), Linggu Mai ('mother tongue'), or simply Papia ('to speak'). In Singapore, it is generally known as Kristang, where it is undergoing sustained revitalisation.

In Atlas of the World's Languages in Danger published by UNESCO, Kristang is classified as a "severely endangered" language, with only about 2,000 speakers. Up to 2014, linguists concerned with Kristang have generally accepted a combined speaker population of about 1,000 individuals or less. The language has about 750 speakers in Malacca. A small number of speakers also live in other Portuguese Eurasian communities in Kuala Lumpur and Penang in Malaysia, and in other diaspora communities in Canada, the United Kingdom, and elsewhere.

== Etymology ==
Its endonym Papia Kristang is taken from Portuguese papear cristão ('Christian language'). The papia element of the name is cognate with Papiamento, another Portuguese-based creole spoken in the Dutch West Indies.

== History ==
=== Origins ===
The Kristang language originated after the conquest of Malacca (Malaysia) in 1511 by the Portuguese Empire. Until a takeover by the Dutch in 1642, Malacca served as one of the key ports in the trade and administration network of Portuguese establishments along with Goa and Hormuz, allowing Portugal control over main Asiatic trade routes. The lingua franca of Malacca then was a pidginised form of Malay known as Bazaar Malay or Melayu Pasar, used amongst the resident foreign population which then consisted mainly of Javanese, Tamils and Hokkien Chinese. The constant traffic of Portuguese and traders of other origins such as India eventually gave birth to Papia Kristang, one of many Portuguese-derived contact languages which resulted from Portuguese colonial expansion during the fifteenth and sixteenth centuries. A pidgin Portuguese preceding the Kristang creole has also been proposed, whereby a reduced system based on Portuguese converges with other languages present in the contact situation.

The community of Kristang speakers descends mainly from interracial relationships between Portuguese men and local women, as well as a number of migrants from Portuguese India, themselves of mixed Indo-Portuguese ancestry. This was supported by Portuguese officials who advocated mixed marriages in the face of a labour shortage in the colonies, leading to the very first native speakers of Kristang as well as the development of the creole.

Even after Portugal lost Malacca and almost all contact in 1641, the Kristang community largely preserved its language. The demographics of Malacca in the mid-17th century was still predominantly made up of the Portuguese even under Dutch control. The Irmang di Greza (Brothers of the Church), a manifestation of the bond between language and religion in the Kristang culture, acted as an intermediary between the priest and the remnants of the Portuguese population despite prohibition by the Dutch. Liturgy and pastoral sessions were conducted in Kristang in Malacca, which contributed to the longevity of the language into a period as late as the 20th century.

Kristang also had a substantial influence on Macanese, the creole language spoken in Macau, due to substantial migration from Malacca after its conquest by the Dutch.

=== Attrition of Kristang ===
The ceding of Malacca by the Dutch to the British via the Anglo-Dutch Treaty of 1824 directly caused the decline of the Kristang language. By the mid 19th century, many Kristangs flocked towards clerical and auxiliary positions provided by their new colonial masters. As such, the Kristang language saw a decline in use compared to English. In addition, the rising affluence of the region meant more job opportunities, resulting in many Kristangs moving away from Malacca. Moreover, the language is not taught at school, although there are still some Church services in Kristang.

In the context of Singapore, Kristang arrived in the 1820s due to the large influx of Eurasian immigrants from Malacca. However, there was little exposure and recognition of Kristang in Singapore, especially when English became entrenched as the sole language of education and the major language used in most spheres of society after the country gained independence in 1965. As a result, the intergenerational transmission of Kristang ceased almost completely.

The upkeep of Kristang can largely be attributed to its connection with the dominant religion of the Portuguese and their relative social standing in their communities between the 1600s to the late 1800s. The core Kristang-speaking communities gradually eroded due to better socioeconomic opportunities elsewhere. Post-World War Two, the new generation of Catholic priests that arrived to replace the pre-war priests who had been executed demonstrated little sensitivity towards the Kristang language and culture. Eventually, the bond between Kristang and religion was severed due to the association of the Portuguese Mission with the St Xavier's Church.

Migration overseas and intermarriage with other nationalities have also led to Kristang speakers leaving the Portuguese Settlement in order to live and work in other parts of Malaysia. Furthermore, the dominantly Kristang-speaking middle-class gradually began to speak English for practical reasons, altering the prestige of English with regards to Kristang. To many in the community, they grew to accept that speaking English was a key to employment instead of Kristang, facilitating a breakdown in the transmission of Kristang.

=== Revitalisation efforts ===
Papia Kristang is facing a steep decline in language use within the community. There has been an apparent language shift to English and Malay due to the reduced prestige and accessibility of Kristang. However, revitalization efforts have begun in recent years in both the Portuguese Settlement in Singapore and Malacca. Such efforts have seen some success, nearly tripling the number of Kristang speakers of varying fluency.

==== Malacca ====
The Kristang-speaking community located at the Portuguese Settlement, or Padri sa Chang ("The Priest's Land") was able to undertake more sustained revitalisation efforts and publicise itself to non-Eurasian Malaysians, and the language. Notably with texts, stories and phrasebooks in Kristang produced by Joan Margaret Marbeck and through investments and interest from individuals and organisations outside the community. Joan Marbeck has produced three publications: Ungu Adanza (An Inheritance), Linggu Mai (Mother Tongue) and the Kristang Phrasebook. She is also credited with writing probably the only play in Kristang, called Seng Marianne (Without Marianne) and was also instrumental in staging a musical in Kristang – Kazamintu no Praiya which translates to 'Wedding on the beach'. Support was also received from the Lisbon-based Calouste Gulbenkian Foundation, which funded and published Marbeck's Kristang text.

Within the community, there were efforts made together with the help of academics to promote their culture and the Kristang language. In 1988, Alan Baxter published A Grammar of Kristang based on his fieldwork within the community. This was the first book which focused on the descriptive grammar of Kristang and established many core concept on Kristang linguistics. It also had a significant impact on many later studies on Kristang.

== Vocabulary ==
The Kristang lexicon borrows heavily from Portuguese, but often with drastic truncation. Due to its largely Portuguese vocabulary, the Kristang lexicon has much in common with other Portuguese-based creoles, including the near-extinct creoles of Indonesia and East Timor. As it is primarily a creole, much of its vocabulary is also derived from Chinese, Indian and Malay languages to varying degrees.

Examples of vocabulary from various origins
Meaning	Kristang	Origin Word	Origin Word Language
shrimp paste	belacã / blacan	belacan	Malay
walking stick	toncá / tongkah	tongkat	Malay
hoe	chancol / changkol	cangkul	Malay
jellyfish	ampê / ampeh	ampai	Malay
lime	churuto / churutu	சுருட்டு curuṭṭu	Tamil
grandfather	tata	தாத்தா tāttā	Tamil
spatula	chengsi	煎匙 tsian-sî	Hokkien
convent	convento / konventu	convento	Portuguese
hospital	hospital / ospital	hospital	Portuguese
toilet	cacus / kakus	kakhuis	Dutch
tombstone	quelda / kelda	kelder	Dutch

Metathesis was common in the derivation of the Kristang lexicon from Portuguese root words. e.g.

- Portuguese gordo → Kristang godru "fat"

== Orthography ==
=== Polynomy ===
Kristang is a polynomic language, where standardisation of the language's spoken and written forms is dispreferred and the natural morphophonological and orthographic variation that Kristang developed as a result of its history and sociocultural context is preferred. This variation is usually concentrated around "famililects" spoken by families rather than geographical dialects, with Kristang famililects generally being categorisable into three distinct forms:

1. A system based on Portuguese orthography
The 19th and 20th centuries saw a rise in the use of Modern Portuguese-based orthography (for example, Rego (1942)) due to the perception of Kristang as a variety of Portuguese instead of a distinct creole language partially based on Early Modern Portuguese. This is characterized by the use of diacritics such as acute accents (á, é, í, ó, ú). The system has been adopted by some native Kristang speakers as well.

2. A system based on a mixture of Portuguese, English and Malay
Other speakers have used a system influenced by Portuguese, English and Malay orthography. This creates an issue as the system is inconsistent in the representation of Kristang sounds and are not immediately intelligible to both speakers and non-speakers of Kristang.

3. A system based on Malay orthography
There are many observable parallels between the phonology of Malay and Kristang which has led to inherent similarities in the orthographic representations of the two languages as well. The first proposal for a standard Kristang orthography was made in 1973 by Ian F. Hancock (1973:25) who recognised this quality and advocated the Malay-based system due to the speakers' familiarity with it. This would, therefore, lead to a swift acquisition of literacy in the reading and writing of the Kristang language.
This system to spell Kristang was further expanded on in A Grammar of Kristang by Alan N. Baxter, in which he agreed on and emphasized the use of the Malay orthography. Published in 1995, Joan Margaret Marbeck's book Ungua Andanza also followed this approach, with the orthography written in a Luso-Malay context.

== Phonology ==
The acoustic and articulatory properties of Kristang have not been extensively studied. However, Hancock (1969, 1973), Batalha (1981), and most recently, Baxter (1988) have outlined brief descriptions of its sound system. In general, Kristang's inventory of consonant and vowel phonemes shows a significant parallel to that of Standard Malay.

=== Consonants ===
Consonant phonemes of Kristang
		Labial	Alveolar	Palatal	Velar
Stop	voiceless	p	t		k
Stop	voiced	b	d		ɡ
Affricate	voiceless			tʃ (Note: Described as /c/ by Baxter (1988) and ch in the inventory by Hancock (1973).)	
Affricate	voiced			d͡ʒ	
Fricative	voiceless	f	s		
Fricative	voiced	v	z		
Nasal		m	n	ɲ (Note: /ñ/ by Baxter (1988) and ny by Hancock (1973).)	ŋ (Note: /ng/ by Baxter (1988).)
Tap/Trill			r		
Lateral			l		

Orthographic note:
The sounds are represented orthographically by their symbols as above, except:

- /ɲ/ is written as ⟨ny⟩ in the Malay-inspired orthography, but as ⟨nh⟩ in the Portuguese-based orthography
- /ŋ/ is written as ⟨ng⟩ in the Malay-inspired orthography, but as either the letters ⟨n⟩ or ⟨m⟩, or the diphthongs ⟨ã⟩ or ⟨ão⟩ in the Portuguese-based orthography, based on context
- /t͡ʃ/ is written as ⟨ch⟩, though it is sometimes written as ⟨c⟩, based on the post-1972 Malay orthography
- /d͡ʒ/ is written as ⟨j⟩, though in the Portuguese-based orthography it may be written as ⟨g⟩ depending on context
- /ɡ/ is written as ⟨g⟩, though in the Portuguese-based orthography it is written as ⟨gu⟩ before the vowels ⟨e⟩ or ⟨i⟩ or as part of a /ɡw/ glide
- /k/ is always written as ⟨k⟩ in the Malay-inspired orthography, while in the Portuguese-based orthography, it is represented with a ⟨c⟩ in most contexts except before the vowels ⟨e⟩ and ⟨i⟩ and as part of a /kw/ glide, where it is written ⟨qu⟩ instead
- /s/ is always written as ⟨s⟩ in the Malay-inspired orthography. In the Portuguese-based orthography it may be variously rendered as either ⟨s⟩, ⟨ss⟩, ⟨c⟩ or ⟨ç⟩, depending on context
- /z/ is always written as ⟨z⟩ in the Malay-inspired orthography, but may be rendered as ⟨s⟩ in the Portuguese-based orthography, depending on context
- /r/ is always written as ⟨r⟩ in the Malay-inspired orthography, but may be rendered as ⟨rr⟩ in the Portuguese-based orthography, depending on context
- /b/ is sometimes written as ⟨v⟩ in the Portuguese-based orthography, based on context

Portuguese words which begin with ⟨ch⟩, pronounced [ʃ] ("sh") in modern Portuguese, are often pronounced as [t͡ʃ] ("ch") in Kristang, e.g.:

- Portuguese chegar /ʃɨˈɡar/ → Kristang chegak /t͡ʃəɡak/ "to arrive"
- Portuguese chuva /ˈʃuvɐ/ → Kristang chua /t͡ʃua/ "rain"

This may be due to Malay influence, or the preservation of an Early Modern Portuguese pronunciation [t͡ʃ] in Kristang. It is also worth noting that Northern Portugal also retains the Portuguese [t͡ʃ] pronunciation.

==== Phonological contrasts ====
Baxter (1988), in particular, established various phonemic contrasts in the Kristang consonant system.

Stops and affricates contrast in the initial and medial positions.

Examples of contrastive distribution between voiced and voiceless stops:
Bilabial		Alveodental		Velar
initial	medial	initial	medial	initial	medial
pai (father)	kapa (castrate)	teng (have, be)	ati (until)	kaba (finish)	saku (sack, pocket)
bai (go)	kaba (finish)	deng (dried stingray)	adi (duck)	gaba (praise)	sagu (sago)

Examples of contrastive distribution between voiced and voiceless affricates:
Palato-alveolar
initial	medial
ceru (smell)	inchidu (full)
jeru (son-in-law)	jinjibri (ginger, gums)

Fricatives contrast in the medial positions. No clear distinctions between voiced-voiceless pairs and all fricative counterparts can be drawn as /v/ is highly infrequent and restricted in distribution and initial /z/ has fallen into disuse.

Examples:
/f/ vs /s/		/f/ vs /z/	/f/ vs /s/
initial	medial	medial	medial
fai (pretend/do)	kofi (coffee)	bafa (steam)	bafu (breath)
sai (go out)	kosi (kick)	baza (pour)	basu (under)

Nasals contrast do not contrast before a consonant, and no contrasts have been found in identical environments in the final position. In the initial position, only /m/, /n/ and /ɲ/ contrast, while all nasals /m, n, ɲ, ŋ/ contrast in the medial position. Tap, as well as lateral liquid consonants, contrast in all positions.

=== Vowels ===
Vowel phonemes of Kristang
	Unrounded		Rounded
	Front	Central	Back
Close	i		u
Close-mid	e		o
Mid	ɛ (Note: The phonemic status of [ɛ] and [ɔ] is debatable. In Hancock's (1973:25) description of the Kristang vowel system, these were treated as variants of the phoneme /e/ and /o/ respectively. The phones [e] and [ɛ], as well as [o] and [ɔ] only contrast in the medial position and limited environments.)	ə (Note: The phoneme /ə/, written ë in Baxter (1988), is described to be of low frequency and limited distribution. When used, it is often in loanwords from Malay, English and Dutch.The Kristang vowel system is similar to the vowel system of Standard Malay in that both languages share the feature of having [ə] as both a realisation of /a/ and /ə/ (Onn 1980:21).)	ɔ
Open		a	

The inventory of vowel phonemes in Kristang is also highly similar to Standard Malay vowel phonemes.

Diphthongs in Kristang
		Portuguese-based spellings	Malay-inspired spellings	Examples
1.	[aw]	au	aw	pau / paw "stick"
2.	[ai]	ai	ay	pai / pay "father"
2.	[ai]	ai	ai	raina "queen"
3.	[eu]	eu	e̹w	céu / se̹w "sky"
3.	[eu]	eu	ew	peu / pew "foot"
4.	[oi]	oi	o̹y	noiva / no̹yba "girlfriend"
4.	[oi]	oi	oy	noivo / noybu "boyfriend"
5.	[io]	io	yo	viola / byola "violin"
6.	[ui]	ui	uy	ruybu "bream fish"
6.	[ui]	oí	wi	mwi "grind"
7.	[iu]	io	iw	frio / friw "cold"
7.	[iu]	iu	yu	ciúme / syumi "jealousy"
8.	[ua]	ua	wa	ráqua / rakwa "shift"
8.	[ua]	ua	ua	chua / cua "rain"
9.	[ia]	ia	ya	pião / pyang "spinning top"
9.	[ia]	ia	ia	dia "day"
10.	[ue]	oe	we	doente / dwenti "ill"
10.	[ue]	ue	we̹	guela / gwe̹la "gullet"

==== Diphthongs and vowel sequences ====
Diphthongs in Kristang are formed when either the vowel /i/, or the vowel /u/, occurs in the same syllable as another vowel. The vowel /i/ and /u/ are pronounced as the semivowels (or glides) [j] and [w] respectively in such cases.

There are 10 word-internal diphthongs in Kristang as outlined by Baxter (1988). Of all 10, 3 (/ai/ as in rainya 'queen', /ua/ as in chua 'rain' and /ia/ as in dia 'day') may also constitute hiatus, i.e. the vowels in would be pronounced as two distinct syllables in certain environments.

The relatively large number of diphthongs is also in contrast to Malay, whereby only three native diphthong phonemes are described:

1. /ai̯/: kedai ('shop')
2. /au̯/: kerbau ('buffalo')
3. /oi̯/: dodoi ('lullaby')

These diphthongs also display visible parallels to certain Kristang vowel sequences [ai], [au] and [oi].

The Portuguese diphthong [oj] (or archaic [ou]) are often reduced to [o] in Kristang in Portuguese loan words, e.g.:

- Portuguese dois/dous → Kristang dos 'two'
- Portuguese à noite/à noute → Kristang anoti/anuti 'tonight'

Kristang diphthongs are monosyllabic and the vowel sequences are differentiated according to its stress position. For example, the stress in /au/ is on the first vowel whereas in /io/, the second vowel is stressed.

=== Stress and rhythm ===
Kristang is a syllable-timed language (not unlike Malay which also displays syllable-based rhythm).

According to Baxter (2004), most polysyllabic words in Kristang can be classified into two large groups based on the stress position in the word.

Stress Rule A

Most words which end in a vowel have tonic stress on the penultimate syllable.

- kaza 'house'
- nomi 'name'
- rayu 'wicked'
- apoyu 'support'
- kumeria 'food'
- rua 'street'

Stress Rule B

Most words which end in a consonant have tonic stress on the final syllable.

- landes 'Dutch'
- natal 'Christmas'

However, stress pattern is not completely predictable in Kristang, as there are also certain words which are exceptions to the above two rules.

Exception to Rule A
Verbs which end in a stressed vowel (e.g. kumi 'to eat'). Attention should be paid to the lexical stress in such instances as it brings about a difference in meaning (e.g. kaza 'house' vs kaza 'to marry").
Some vowel-ending words are also stressed on the antepenultimate syllable instead. (such as familia 'family', animu 'valour')
Exception to Rule B
Some consonant-ending words are stressed on the penultimate syllable (such as okel 'spectacles', nobas 'news')

Kristang also displays stress shifting in that many verbs display a tendency to shift their stress from the final syllable to penultimate syllable when followed by a stressed syllable in the next word, especially in rapid speech.

== Grammar ==
The grammatical structure of Kristang is similar to that of the Malay language. The usage of verbs is one of the grammatical features of Kristang that displays this quality. While Portuguese verbs mainly use morphology, or suffixes, to change a verb's tense or for it to match with the person and number of its subject, Malay does not change the form of the verb itself. Instead, it makes use of pre-verbal words to convey tense and does not indicate the person or number of the subject in the form of the verb. Kristang's structure is practically identical to Malay, although the choice of words comes from Portuguese.

=== Syntax ===
Papiá Kristang has Subject–Verb–Object (SVO) word order in simple sentences. The direct human objects are case-marked by the preposition ku. The same preposition also marks indirect objects. Intransitive clauses, the case-marked indirect object may precede the direct object, especially when the former is pronominal. Noncore arguments are generally located either at the beginning or at the end of the sentence as shown in example (1).

Amiang Diego lo dá ku bos aké doi na butika
tomorrow Diego FUT give DAT 2SG that money LOC shop
'Tomorrow, Diego will give you that money, at the shop.'

Adversative Passive, which is used to talk about situations where a negative action happens to something, but the person or originator of the negative action is not mentioned, is also present both in Kristang and Malay. The adversative passive is signalled by kena (Malay), and by tokah (Kristang).

Colloquial Malay	Kristang	Colloquial English near-equivalent
Ikan kena makan	Pesi tokah kumih	The fish got eaten

For complex sentences, the phrases and clauses are joined by coordinating conjunctions ku "with, and", kě "or", and mas "but". There are also instances where object clauses may be headed by ki; however, this is rare and is only found in traditional formal registers, as in a wedding speech. The most frequent means of expressing nominal subordination is parataxis as shown in example (2) and (3).

Nus pidi ki tudu bolotu podi kumí sabrozu
1PL ask COMP all 3PL can eat tasty
'We ask that you may all eat to your satisfaction.'

Yo ja skribé ku eli Ø John ja kazá.
1SG PFV write ACC 3SG Ø John PFV marry
'I wrote to him that John has married.'

Adverbial clauses are headed by antis di "before", kiora "when", chuma "as", kantu "if", padi "in order to", kauzu ki "because", kifoi "because", etc., yet may also be indicated by parataxis without conjunctions.

Relative clauses are headed by ki "what, who" (and very rarely by keng "who"), yet also commonly occur with a pronoun head or may occur without it. This can be seen in example (4) and (5).

Tantu yo sa kambra kambradu ki ja bai skola pun.
many 1SG GEN friend friend REL PFV go school too
'many of my friends who went to school too.'

Jenti prenya eli parí muré ja fiká pontianak.
person pregnant 3SG bear die PFV become vampire
'A pregnant woman who dies in childbirth becomes a vampire.'

In Kristang, The noun phrase (NP) is a structure which can occur as subject of a verb, object of a verb, object of a relator or as a predicate.

There are five types of prenominal determiners in Kristang:

Quantifier:

kada kaza
each house
'Each house’.

Numeral:

dos prau
two boat
'Two boats’.

Interrogative determiner:

kí redi ?
REL net Q
'What net?’

Demonstrative article:

aké albi
DEM tree
'That tree.’

The demonstratives isi and ake(li) 'that' precede the noun and indicate a distance contrast.

Possessive NP + sa :

eli sa irmáng femi
3S G sibling female
'His sister.’

Adnominal possessives precede the noun and consist of possessor (noun or pronoun) + genitive marker sa (or sě).

In comparative constructions of equality, the adjective is marked by iguál 'equal' and standard is marked by ku 'with':

John iguál grandi ku Peter.
John equal big with Peter
'John is as big as Peter.’

In the comparative construction of inequality, the adjective is marked by más 'more' and the standard by di 'of':

Eli más altu di Pio.
3SG more tall of Pio
'He is taller than Pio.’

The superlative comparison consists of the comparative of inequality plus a universal standard:

Maria más altu di tudu mbes aké femi femi.
Maria more tall of all once DEM female female
'Maria is the tallest of all the girls.’

There is only one set of personal pronouns that occurs in all pronominal functions. The 3SG and 3PL pronouns only refer to animates, principally to humans.

	personal pronouns	adnominal possessives
1SG	yo	yo + sa
2SG	bos	bos + sa
3SG	eli	eli + sa
1PL	nus	nus + sa
2PL	bolotu	bolotu + sa
3PL	olotu	olotu + sa

=== Morphology ===
Pluralisation is also the same in Malay as in Kristang. For example, in English and Portuguese, an '–s' is added to make cats or gatos, whereas in Kristang and Malay, the entire word is duplicated, such as gatu-gatu in Kristang, and kucing-kucing in Malay. Reduplication is not only a feature of the noun class but also a feature of the adjective, adverb and verb classes. Adjectives and adverbs reduplicate to signify intensity: kěni~kěninu, "quite small, very small", belu belu "quite old", sedu sedu "quite/very early". On the other hand, the interrogative pronouns reduplicate to signify indefiniteness: keng keng (who who) "whoever", ki ki (what what "whatever". As for the reduplication of the numerals, dos "two" and tres "three", it gave the respective readings "in pairs" and "in threes".

With nouns, reduplication can signal plurality, often involving partial reduplication: krenkrensa (= krensa + krensa) 'children', femfemi (= femi + femi) 'women'. However, the reduplication of nouns with non-specific reference in object position may yield the meaning 'all kinds of' or 'lots of':

Yo sa sogru gadrá pastu pastu
1SG GEN father.in.law keep bird bird
'My father-in-law keeps all kinds of birds.'

Without reduplication, the above sentence would simply express plural: 'birds'.

To indicate verb tenses, the following appositions are used: jah (i.e. from the Portuguese já, meaning "already", or controversially a corruption of Malay dah, shortened version of sudah, also "already") for past tenses; ta (from está, which means "is") for present continuous tenses and logu or lo (from logo, which means "soon") for the future tense. These simplified forms correspond with their equivalents in Malay sudah, sedang, and akan, respectively.

English	Standard Portuguese	Malay	Kristang
I eat	Eu como	Saya makan	Yo kumih
I ate/have eaten	Eu comi	Saya sudah makan	Yo ja kumih
I will eat	Eu comerei	Saya akan makan	Yo logu kumih
He eats	Ele come	Dia makan	Eli kumih

Papiá Kristang has two overt markers of aspect (ja 'perfective' and ta 'imperfective'), an overt marker of future tense (lo(gu)), and a zero marker.

This table summarised the functions of these markers:

	lexical aspect	tense/aspect	mood
Ø	dynamic	habitual past/present (perfective)	imperative
	stative-1 or -2	past / present	
ja	dynamic	perfective	
ta	dynamic	imperfective past/present	
	stative-2	imperfective past/present	
lo(gu)	dynamic	future habitual present/past	conditional
	stative-1 or -2	future	

Example (15) shows the zero marker (Ø) with a dynamic verb of past or present habitual representation:

Yo sa pai Ø fai sibrisu na municipal.
1SG GEN father Ø do work LOC municipal
'My father works/used to work in the Municipal.'

Example (16) shows the marker ja with a dynamic verb, with perfective aspect representation:

Eli ja bai mar (onti anoti).
3SG PFV go sea yesterday night
'He went fishing (last night).'

The marker ta occurs with dynamic verbs in past or present contexts, with either a progressive reading, as in (17), or an iterative reading, as in (18):

Diego ta les buku.
Diego IPFV read book
'Diego is/was reading a book.'

Eli ta fai sibrisu na Singaporura.
3SG IPFV do work LOC Singapore
'He is/was working in Singapore.'

The marker lo(go) conveys a future or conditional reading, as in examples (19) and (20), respectively where it occurs with a dynamic verb:

Amiang out dia, eli logu bai mar.
tomorrow other day 3SG FUT go sea
'The day after tomorrow, he will go fishing.'

Kanti yo teng doi, yo lo kompra kareta.
if 1SG have money 1SG FUT buy car
'If I have/had the money I will/would buy a car.'

The Tense-Aspect-Mood (TAM) markers do not normally co-occur. Combinations of markers are very rare and when they do occur they appear to involve an adverbial reading of the initial marker. Thus, when ja is seen to combine with the imperfective marker ta, ja has the adverbial reading 'already' of its Portuguese source:

Kora yo ja chegá eli ja ta kumí
when 1SG PFV arrive 3SG already IPFV eat
'When I arrived, he was already eating.'

== Kristang examples ==
=== Numbers ===
Much of the lexicon for Kristang numbers draws influence from Portuguese, a Romance language. However, unlike Portuguese, which distinguishes between the masculine and feminine forms of "one" (um/uma) and "two" (dois/duas), numbers in Kristang do not inflect for gender.

English	Kristang	Standard Portuguese	Malay
one	ungua/ngua	um (masc.) / uma (fem.)	satu
two	dos	dois (masc.) / duas (fem.)	dua
three	tres	três	tiga
four	katru	quatro	empat
five	singku	cinco	lima
six	sez	seis	enam
seven	seti	sete	tujuh
eight	oitu	oito	lapan
nine	nubi	nove	sembilan
ten	des	dez	sepuluh

=== Pronouns ===
A peculiarity of the language is the pronoun yo (meaning "I") which is used in Northern Portuguese (pronounced as yeu), as well as Spanish and Italian/Sicilian.

English	Kristang	Standard Portuguese	Malay
Me	yo	eu	saya (formal) / aku (casual)
You (singular)	bos	vós	Awak/Kamu
You (plural)	bolotudu/bolotu	vós todos	Awak semua/Kamu semua
We	nus	nós	kami
He/she/it	eli	ele, ela, isto	dia
They	olotu	eles	mereka

=== Common phrases ===
English	Kristang	Standard Portuguese	Malay
Thank You	Mutu Merseh	Muitas mercês	Terima Kasih
How Are You?	Teng Bong?	Estás bom?/Têm bom?	Awak apa khabar?
What's your name?	Ki bos sa numi?	Qual é o seu nome?/Que vós seu nome?	Siapa nama awak?
Good Morning	Bong Pamiang	Boa Manhã	Selamat Pagi
Good Afternoon	Bong Midia	Bom Meio-dia	Selamat Petang
Good Evening	Bong Atadi	Boa Tarde	Selamat Malam
Good Night	Bong Anuti	Boa Noite	Selamat Malam/Tidur
Mother	mai	mãe	Emak/Ibu/Bonda/Ummi/Mama
Father	pai	pai	Bapa/Ayah/Abah/Abi
Wife	muleh	mulher	Isteri
Husband	maridu	marido	Suami
Old Woman	bela	velha	Wanita Tua
Old Man	belu	velho	Lelaki Tua
Little one	Quenino / Keninu	Pequenino	Si Kecil
Mouth	boca / boka	boca	Mulut
Fat	godru	gordo	Gemuk
Beautiful	bonitu	bonito	Cantik
Party	festa	festa	Pesta
Yes	seng	sim	Ya
No	ngka	não ("nunca")	Tidak
Who	keng	quem	Siapa
What	ki	que	Apa
When	kiora	quando ("que hora")	Bila
Where	ondi	onde	Mana
Why	kifoi	porque ("que foi")	Mengapa
How	klai	como ("que ha")	Bagaimana

=== Poem of Malacca ===
Kristang version
Standard Portuguese translation
Malay translation
English translation
Portuguese-based spelling
Malay-based spelling

Quem tem fortuna ficar na Malaca,
Não querer partir vai outro terra.
P'raqui tudo gente tem amizade,
Quando partir logo ficar saudade.

Ó Malaca, terra de São Francisco,
N'ter outro terra que eu querer.
Ó Malaca onde tem sempre fresco,
Eu querer ficar até morrer.

Keng teng fortuna fikah na Malaka,
Nang kereh partih bai otru tera.
Pra ki tudu jenti teng amizadi,
Kontu partih logu fikah saudadi.

Oh Malaka, tera di San Francisku,
Nteh otru tera ki yo kereh.
Oh Malaka undi teng sempri fresku,
Yo kereh fikah ateh mureh.

Quem tem fortuna fica em Malaca,
Não quer partir para outra terra.
Por aqui toda a gente tem amizade,
Quando tu partes logo fica a saudade.

Ó Malaca, terra de São Francisco,
Não tem outra terra que eu queira.
Ó Malaca, onde tem sempre frescura,
Eu quero ficar até morrer.

Siapa beruntung tinggal di Melaka,
Tidak mahu ke tanah berbeza.
Di sini semua bersahabat,
Bila seorang pergi terasa rindu.

Oh Melaka, tanah Saint Francis,
Tiada tanah lain yang ku mahu.
Oh Melaka, dimana adanya kesegaran,
Aku mahu tinggal di sini hingga ke akhir nyawa.

A fortunate one stays in Malacca,
Doesn't want to go to another land.
In here everyone has friendship,
When you leave right then wistfulness stays.

Oh Malacca, land of Saint Francis,
There is no other land that I want.
Oh Malacca, where there's always freshness,
I want to stay here until I die.

== See also ==
- Kristang people
- Eurasians in Singapore
- Chavacano language, a Spanish-derived Malayo-Polynesian creole
- Mardijker Creole, as Kristang is also called Malacca–Batavia Creole
