= A. J. Braga =

Singaporean politician (1900–1968)

- Braga in 1963

Minister for Health
- In office 7 April 1955 – 31 March 1959
- Chief Minister: David Marshall; Lim Yew Hock
- Preceded by: Position established
- Succeeded by: Ahmad Ibrahim (PAP)

Member of the Legislative Assembly for Katong Constituency
- In office 22 April 1955 – 31 March 1959
- Preceded by: John Laycock (PP)
- Succeeded by: Joseph Francis de Conceicao (PAP)
- Majority: 1955: 4,680 (45.66%)

Personal details
- Born: Armand Joseph Braga; 10 June 1900 Singapore, Straits Settlements (present-day Singapore)
- Died: 7 November 1968 (aged 68) Lloyd Gardens, Singapore
- Party: Singapore People's Alliance (1958–1959)
- Other political affiliations: Labour Front (1954–1958)
- Spouse(s): Mona Patricia Braga (m. 1931; div. 1948) Amy Wong (m. 1949)
- Children: 2; including Myrna
- Education: University of Hong Kong; Middle Temple
- Occupation: Politician; barrister

Armand Joseph Braga (10 June 1900 – 7 November 1968), commonly known as A. J. Braga, was a Singaporean politician and barrister who served as the first minister for health from 1955 to 1959 in the first Legislative Assembly of Singapore. A former member of the Labour Front, he served as the member of the Legislative Assembly representing Katong Constituency from 1955 to 1959.

Born in Singapore under British rule, he studied in both Singapore and Hong Kong. Originally studying medicine, he stopped in 1918 and moved to London to instead study law, where he was called to the bar in 1927. He returned to Singapore in 1928 and served as the Eurasian Association's representative on the Municipal Commission in 1935, and from 1938 to 1942. During the Japanese occupation, he was briefly appointed the leader of the Eurasian community by the Japanese officials, later being succeeded by C. J. Paglar. In 1954, he was announced as a Labour Front candidate for the 1955 general election, contesting in Katong Constituency.

He was successful in his election and was subsequently made the first minister for health in chief minister David Marshall's cabinet. Following Marshall's resignation in 1956, he was succeeded as chief minister by Lim Yew Hock, with Braga maintaining his portfolio in Lim's cabinet. In 1958, Braga joined the newly formed Singapore People's Alliance, which was led by Lim. He retired from politics prior to the 1959 general election due to poor health, and died in 1968.

== Early life and education ==
Braga was born on 10 June 1900 in Singapore, when it was a part of the Straits Settlements, to Joseph Vicente Braga and Bertha Minna Braga (née Asmus); he came from an established Eurasian family from Macao. He had his education in Singapore and Hong Kong at St. Joseph's Institution and St Joseph's College, respectively. Braga then attended Queen's College before studying medicine at the University of Hong Kong, at his father's insistence.

However, Braga preferred law and left the university, becoming a clerk to an articled lawyer in Singapore from 1918 to 1921. He then worked for the Vacuum Oil Company as a travelling representative from 1921 to 1924, eventually becoming a sales manager of their Bangkok branch. After saving up enough money from work, Braga went to London to study law at Middle Temple, where he was called to the bar in May 1927. He returned to Singapore to practice law in 1928. He briefly worked at a local firm before deciding to open his own practice at Battery Road.

== Early career ==
=== Municipal Commission (1935; 1938–1942) ===
Braga was a member of the Eurasian Association of Singapore, being elected to their committee from 1930 to 1935, 1938 to 1940, and 1964 to 1966. In January 1934, he and W. F. Mosbergen were chosen by the Association as their representatives for a delegation to protest the British government's decision to increase school fees. He had been nominated for vice president of the Association sometime prior to 1935, but was unsuccessful. In 1935, the Eurasian Association's representative in the Municipal Commission S. C. de Souza died. Braga was selected by the Association as their new representative on the Commission; his nomination was proposed by C. B. Webb and seconded by W. A. Aeria. He was successfully elected as a municipal commissioner in May. Braga later resigned from the post in 1936 and was succeeded by G. E. N. Oehlers. That same year, he served as vice president of the Association to president R. Tessensohn.

In July 1938, Braga was reelected to the Municipal Commission, succeeding Oehlers, who resigned. In October, he and commissioner T. H. Stone petitioned for the Municipal Commission to recognise the Municipal Services Club in order to better facilitate negotiations between the both of them. It was made up of 643 members, of whom many were municipal employees. Their suggestion was rejected as "premature" by commissioners S. B. Tan and K. K. Pathy. In 1939, Braga and E. J. Bennett were appointed to a committee by the Commission that would discuss, with the government, the funds being spent on traffic control. By the end of 1940, it was announced that he would have his term extended starting 1941. In 1941, he was appointed to a committee to investigate indebtedness of municipal employees. His term lasted till February 1942, prior to the fall of Singapore.

=== Japanese occupation ===
During the Japanese occupation, the Municipal Commission was replaced with the Tokubetsu Shi. As Association president Claude da Silva had left Singapore during the occupation, Braga served as the spokesperson and leader for the Eurasian community, having been appointed so by the Japanese officials. He pledged Eurasian cooperation with the Japanese.

In September 1942, Braga, alongside other Eurasians, founded the All-Malayan (Eurasian) Association, Syonan. The Association was to be nonpartisan and work with the Japanese government. Braga was appointed to its Working Committee, and was succeeded by C. J. Paglar as leader of the Eurasian community when Paglar was appointed as the Association's president. Braga stepped down as leader as he had been told by F. V. Woodford that he was not liked by the Japanese. He was also made the deputy public prosecutor and performed a review of the Syonan Supreme Court and public prosecutor's office in 1943, where he praised it as "running smoothly and efficiently".

Following the surrender of the Japanese, Braga was a witness on an inquiry on Paglar in 1946, who was believed to have made anti-British speeches and helped the Japanese during the occupation. Braga defended Paglar's decisions as protecting the Eurasian community.

== Political career ==
In 1954, Braga was announced as a Labour Front (LF) candidate ahead of the 1955 general election. He was to contest in Katong Constituency, against the Progressive Party's John Laycock, with Braga described as having "strong socialist views". At the 1955 general election, Braga contested in Katong Constituency against Laycock and the Democratic Party's Chan Wah Chip. Braga's campaign included upholding the LF's four-year plan for Singapore and reducing the Family Planning Association's (FPA) funding. The Singapore Free Press stated that his views against the FPA boosted his support amongst Catholics voters.

During the campaign period, Braga protested the removal of five of his ten election banners by the City Council to the council's president, T. P. F. McNeice. The banners had been removed for damaging the lamp posts they were displayed on, but he argued that the string used to tie the banners up would not cause any damage. McNeice agreed to his claims and the banners were returned. Braga successfully won Katong Constituency with 4,680 votes, against Laycock's 2,965 and Chan's 2,605.

=== Minister for Health (1955–1959) ===
Following the LF's minor majority of ten seats in the Legislative Assembly, LF leader David Marshall was named as the first chief minister. In April 1955, Marshall announced his cabinet, with Braga named as the first minister for health. In maintaining his election promises, Braga stated he would oppose any increase in grant by the government to the FPA, along with beginning talks with Catholic and Muslim leaders on the matter. In May, he and his permanent secretary R. H. Bland toured all of Singapore's hospitals. In September, Braga opened the World Health Organization's Western Pacific meeting in Singapore.

In November, Braga was questioned for two hours by opposition members of the Legislative Assembly on nine of the Ministry of Health's building projects. During the debate, he was seen consistently passing notes to permanent secretary Bland, supposedly to inquire on answers. Braga advanced to having quiet conversations with Bland and, when asked on progress of the conversation of a student's hostel, was stopped by the speaker from referring to Bland. This led to the People's Action Party's leader Lee Kuan Yew criticising the Ministry of Health as a "damnably inefficient department". However, Lee withdrew the comments after being warned by the speaker.

In January 1956, Braga suggested the creation of a lottery in Singapore, stating that it could increase their annual revenue by S$5 million. He further proposed forming a joint lottery with the Federation of Malaya, having discussed this with Federation minister Leong Yew Koh; Braga had previously floated this idea in August 1955. In March, he was announced as a member of the delegation to the constitutional talks in London, headed by Marshall. However, the constitutional talks would be unsuccessful and Marshall resigned as chief minister as a result, with minister for labour and welfare Lim Yew Hock succeeding him. In Lim's cabinet, Braga maintained his post as minister for health.

In October, he announced that the government would launch a tuberculosis campaign, with the relevant facilities at Tan Tock Seng Hospital planned to be expanded. A Tuberculosis Control Unit was also to be created next year; this recommendation was made by Sir Harry Wunderly, a representative of the Colombo Plan. After assessing the country's tuberculosis situation, he advised the government to adopt such a measure. In April 1957, Braga went on a two week trip to Japan to observe their hospitals and medical practices. It cost around S$5,000 in taxpayers' money, with the rest paid by the Japanese government. Upon his return, he suggested implementing Japanese practices he had observed, such as educational toys for sick children and teaching parenting to mothers.

However, later in May, Braga received criticism for his Japan trip. The opposition largely questioned the benefit of his trip, with the Liberal-Socialists's (LSP) John Ede opining that his Ministry of Health could have made the same decisions and observations he did in Japan. Braga replied that the trip also boosted relations between the two countries as he had been invited to visit by the Japanese government. When it was later announced the cost of the trip, Braga described it as "a drop in the ocean". In August, he stated that "Hospital graft [was] being probed", in reference to allegations of corruption in hospitals. In November 1958, Braga announced that he would be joining chief minister Lim's new political party, the Singapore People's Alliance (SPA), alongside other assemblymen.

That same month, he stated in the Legislative Assembly that they would begin mass Sabin vaccinations to help prevent the spread of polio. During that same session, a censure requested by Lee, who believed that Braga and his ministry were working inefficiently in distributing the Sabin vaccine, was rejected by a large majority. Before departing for a trip to Japan, he predicted that the polio epidemic would have subsided by the time he returned. When he came back in December, this proved largely correct. He also held informal talks with some Japanese experts on polio while there. Additionally, addressing news that he would become the communications and works minister with the SPA, Braga stated "That's an old story. I don't know anything about it."

On 11 February 1959, he suffered a heart attack and was admitted to the Singapore General Hospital, but recovered two days later. In April, ahead of the 1959 general election, Braga announced his intention to contest in Mountbatten Constituency as a SPA candidate, having been asked to do so by Mountbatten residents. However, he was still in the midst of receiving confidence from his doctors to stand. He later said that he would not stand due to poor health, and instead supported Mountbatten candidate Seow Peck Leng. Braga made his last public appearance as health minister in May, when he opened the S$4.1 million Thomson Road Hospital. During his term as health minister, he helped expand facilities to train nurses in Singapore.

== Post-political career ==
In 1961, two years after Braga left office, prime minister Lee criticised him as a "pleasure-loving, fishing, shooting and hunting minister." Following the 1963 Pulau Senang prison riots, Braga was one of ten lawyers defending the 59 prisoners involved in the riots that led to the deaths of four prison guards. He defended three of the 59 prisoners, namely Chia Tiong Guan, Koh Teck Thow, and Jimmy Low Chai Kiat. Of the three, Chia and Low were found not guilty, while Koh was given two years' imprisonment for rioting. In 1966, Braga unsuccessfully argued the appeals of Harun bin Said and Osman bin Haji Muhammad Ali, the accused in the MacDonald House bombing.

== Personal life and death ==
Braga was known for his interest in fishing, hunting, and magic, having served as the president of the Malayan Magic Circle. In 1931, Braga married his first wife, Mona Patricia Braga (née Shelly), at the Cathedral of the Good Shepherd. Together they had two daughters, born 1931 and 1935, respectively. One of their daughters, Patricia Anne Braga, died on 21 November 1948 after drowning in a car accident. His other daughter was social worker Myrna Braga-Blake, who died in 2019. In 1934, Braga was involved in a car accident at the junction of Orchard and Cairnhill roads. His car was turned over with him, his wife, and his syce inside, and he received a wound on his forehead.

In 1948, divorce proceedings were initiated between Braga and Mona. Mona alleged that Braga had committed adultery, stating that she had learnt of his cheating while she was overseas, further claiming that he had a mistress prior to the fall of Singapore. Braga filed a counter-allegation, accusing her of committing the same with several others. Mona confessed to one of her affairs – to naval commander John Fry – and requested custody of their children. The court ultimately granted Braga a decree nisi and dismissed Mona's petition. In 1949, Braga married his second wife, Amy Wong.

On 7 November 1968, Braga was found dead at his home in Lloyd Gardens at approximately 9:00 p.m., aged 68. Chief Justice Wee Chong Jin, Attorney-General Tan Boon Teik, and Queen's Counsel A. P. Godwin paid tribute to him.
