= HMS Pluto =

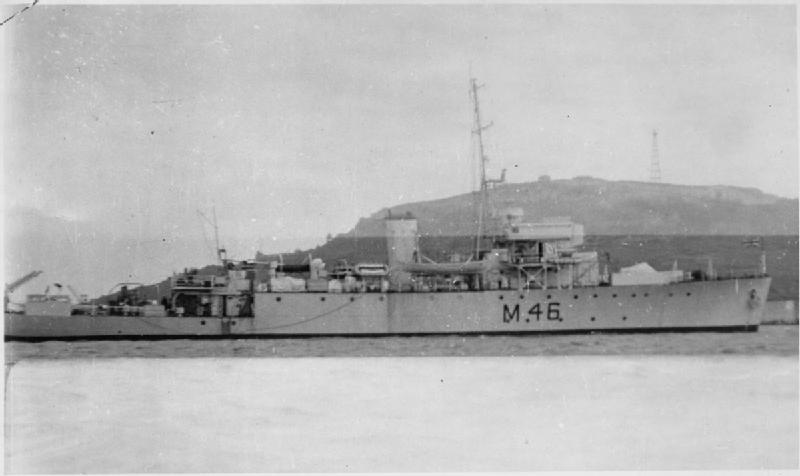
HMS Pluto

Six ships of the Royal Navy have borne the name HMS Pluto, after Pluto, a god of Roman mythology:

- HMS Pluto (1745) was an 8-gun fire ship purchased from civilian service in 1745 when she had been named Roman Emperor. She was sold in 1747.
- HMS Pluto (1756) was an 8-gun fire ship purchased from civilian service in 1756 when she had been named New Concord. She was sold in 1762.
- HMS Pluto was previously HMS Tamar, a 16-gun sloop. She was renamed HMS Pluto when she was converted into a fire ship in 1777. The French privateer Duc de Chartres captured her on 30 November 1780. Pluto's subsequent fate is unknown.
- HMS Pluto (1782) was a 14-gun fire ship of the Royal Navy launched in 1782. Pluto was converted to a sloop in 1793. She spent the period of the French Revolutionary Wars on the Newfoundland station where she captured a French naval vessel. During the Napoleonic Wars Pluto was stationed in the Channel. There she detained numerous merchant vessels trading with France or elsewhere. Pluto was laid up in 1809 and sold in 1817 into mercantile service. The mercantile Pluto ran aground near Margate on 31 August 1817 and filled with water.
- HMS Pluto (1831) was a 500 ton wood paddle gunvessel launched in 1831 for service along the African coast and broken up in 1861.
- HMS Pluto (J446) was an Algerine-class minesweeper launched in 1944 and sold in 1972.

== Other ==
- HCS Pluto was a vessel built in 1822 at Calcutta as a steam dredge but that was converted to a gun-vessel during the first Anglo-Burmese War. After the war the British East India Company sold her and she became a coal hulk (minus her engines) that sank in a gale.
- HEICS Pluto was the first of six iron hulled sliding keel steamers completed for the EIC just prior to the first Opium War. She was ordered on a trial voyage on 16 September 1839. It was determined she had defects in her construction and was brought home for repairs. She finally sails to the East on 28 October 1841. After extensive service in Indian, Bornean and Chinese waters she was transferred to the Bengal Marine in 1854 and then ultimately to the Straits Settlements in 1863 where she was known as the HM Straits Steamer Pluto until she was broken up and her hull sold off in 1868.
- Colonial Steamer Pluto was a 400-ton paddle steamer of 100 hp (75 kW) built by J.G. Laurie in 1870 for the Colony of the Straits Settlements. She saw service in Malayan waters and figured in the troubles arising from the Selangor Civil War, and in the Perak disturbances of 1875–1876.

== In fiction ==
A fictional HMS Pluto appears as the admiral's flagship in the Horatio Hornblower novel A Ship of the Line.

== See also ==
- HMS Conundrum – drums used for laying a pipeline for Operation Pluto.
