= Edwin Tessensohn =

Singaporean politician (1855–1926)

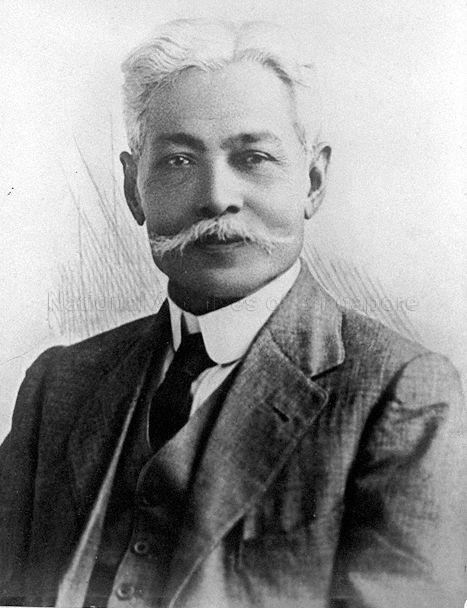
- Tessensohn in the 1900s
- Born: 8 April 1855; Malacca, Straits Settlements
- Died: 26 September 1926 (aged 71); Singapore General Hospital, Singapore, Straits Settlements
- Resting place: Bidadari Cemetery
- Spouse(s): Clementine da Silva (m. 1873; died 1899) Emily Chopard (m. 1904; died 1921)
- Children: 3

John Edwin Richard Tessensohn (8 April 1855 – 26 September 1926) was a Singaporean politician and leader of the Eurasian community of Singapore. He was the first Eurasian representative to the Legislative Council of the Straits Settlements and served as the president of the Singapore Recreation Club, a prominent Eurasian club, for 25 years.

== Early life and education ==
Tessensohn was born to John Tessensohn and his wife Jacobina Elizabeth Koek on 8 April 1855 in Malacca. Jacobina was the daughter of Adriaan Koek, an honorary chief justice in Malacca. He came to Singapore at age 15 as his mother believed the educational opportunities there to be better. He studied at the St. Joseph's Institution, which he graduated from in 1872.

== Career ==
From 1874 to 1875, Tessensohn served in the Singapore Volunteer Corps. After graduating, he became a clerk at the firm Hamilton, Gray & Co., where he remained for 12 years. He then worked for the British India Steam Navigation Company. In 1884, he became a comprador at Boustead & Co., where he remained for 37 years, retiring in August 1921 to establish his own business, Edw. Tessensohn Co., a firm dealing in land, estate, shipping and commission agents, which was founded in the following year. He became a member of the Municipal Commission of Singapore in 1915. In 1920, Tessensohn helped found the Clerical Union, of which he served as the first vice-president. In 1922, he was appointed a justice of the peace. In the 1920s, he was the patron of both the Singapore and South Malaya Boy Scout Association, which he was also the vice-president of, and the St. Joseph's Institution Old Boy's Association. In January 1923, he began serving as the first Eurasian representative of the Legislative Council of the Straits Settlements. He was the chairman of the Cemetery Committee and served on the Resident Assessment Board. He was the director of C. A. Ribeiro & Co. and Guan Kiat & Co.. He was appointed an Officer of the Order of the British Empire (OBE) in the 1926 Birthday Honours.

Tessensohn became an auditor of the Singapore Recreation Club, a prominent Eurasian club, in 1886. He was first elected the president of the club in 1894. He was reelected president three times and his final term as president ended in 1927, resulting in a total of 25 years spent as the club's president. In 1904, he laid the foundation stone of its new clubhouse. He founded the Eurasian Literary Association, a Eurasian Association precursor, in 1918, of which he was also a patron. He served as the secretary of the Mutual Improvement Society, another prominent Eurasian organisation. He served on the committee of the Eurasian Association from its founding in 1919 to 1922. He was also the association's patron. He was also a patron of the Portuguese Amateur Dramatic Company. In 1918, Tessensohn founded the corps' Eurasian company with Hugh Ransome Stanley Zehnder and Noel L. Clarke to aid in the World War I war effort. He also served on the corps' advisory committee.

Tessensohn served on the management committee of the Cathedral of the Good Shepherd and was its warden for 30 years. He served as the secretary of the Singapore chapter of the Society of Saint Vincent de Paul from its founding in 1884. In 1901, he became a committee member of the Singapore Catholic Club.

== Personal life and death ==
In 1873, Tessensohn married Clementine da Silva, with whom he had one son, municipal commissioner Reginald Tessensohn. Da Silva died in 1899, and he remarried Emily Chopard, a fellow Eurasian of French descent, with whom he had a son and a daughter, in 1904. Chopard died on 28 April 1921. Legislative councillor Francis Albert de Witt was a nephew of his. Civil servant George Edwin Bogaars was his great-grandson. Reginald's son, Dr. Clement Louis Tessensohn, served as the club's vice-president for 13 years and Clement's son, Reginald John Tessensohn, also served as the club's vice-president.

Tessensohn died on 26 September 1926 at the Singapore General Hospital. His body was buried at the Bidadari Cemetery. Tessensohn Road near Little India was named in honour of him. He was featured on one of four stamps in a set featuring Singapore pioneers released on 28 February 2001 by Singapore Post in 2001. The other three stamps featured merchant Tan Tock Seng, journalist Mohamed Eunos bin Abdullah, and businessman P. Govindasamy Pillai.
