= Reginald Tessensohn =

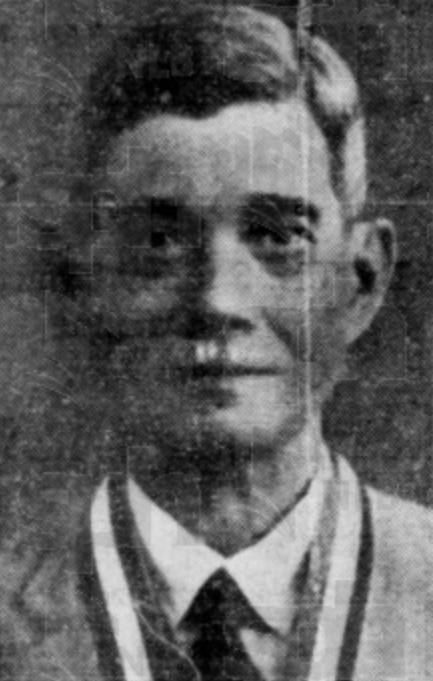
Tessensohn in 1939.

Francis Reginald Tessensohn (1875 – 1943) was an insurer and member of the Municipal Commission of Singapore. A prominent member of the Eurasian community of Singapore, he served as the vice-president of the Eurasian Association, of which he was a founding member, and as the president of the Singapore Recreation Club.

== Early life and education ==
Tessensohn was born sometime between 1875 and 1899 (Note: Clementine da Silva married Edwin Tessensohn in 1873 and died in 1899.) to Edwin Tessensohn and Clementine da Silva. He was a member of the Tessensohn family, one of the "best-known Eurasian families in the Colony". In 1894, he was a student at the Raffles Institution.

== Career ==
In the late 1890s, Tessensohn began working at the insurance department of the trading firm Boustead & Co., where he was involved in marine insurance. His father was then also an employee of the company. Tessensohn became the secretary of the Catholic Club on its founding in 1900. He was appointed the warden of the Cathedral of the Good Shepherd, serving in this position for several years. In August 1905, he was elected a member of the committee of the Singapore Recreation Club, a prominent Eurasian social club, under his father as president. In August 1909, Tessensohn resigned from his position as secretary of the Catholic Club, being succeeded in this position by W. Mosbergen. On 24 June 1913, he was elected to the committee of the Singapore Marine Insurance Association. He was elected to the committee of the Fire Insurance Association on 4 April 1917. He was elected a member of the committee of the Eurasian Association along with his father at its first general meeting, held in November 1919. In September of the following year, he was elected the secretary and the chairman of the Board of Control (games) of the Singapore Recreation Club.

In December 1926, Tessensohn was appointed a member of the Municipal Commission of Singapore in place of his father, who had died earlier that year. In August 1927, he was elected the vice-president of the Singapore Recreation Club in place of Claude Henry da Silva, who had instead been elected president following Edwin Tessensohn's death. He was appointed a member of the committee which in charge of visiting the Singapore General Hospital in April 1928. In August, he was elected the vice-president of the Eurasian Association under Noel L. Clarke. In the same month, he was replaced as vice-president of the Singapore Recreation Club by da Silva, who was in turn replaced as president by Clarke. Tessensohn returned to being a committee member. In October 1929, he was appointed to the Visiting Committee of the Mental Hospital. In September 1929, he was again elected a committee member of the Eurasian Association, being succeeded as vice-president by da Silva. In November 1934, Tessensohn was elected the vice-president of both the Eurasian Association and the Singapore Recreation Club, under Clarke as president. By December, he had been appointed a Justice of the Peace. He was appointed a member of the Board of Visiting Justices for Singapore for the year of 1935.

In April 1935, Tessensohn began acting as the president of the Eurasian Association while Clarke was on leave. The following month, he received the King George V Silver Jubilee Medal as a member of the Municipal Commission. In May 1936, Clarke resigned as the president of the Eurasian Association and Tessensohn was to serve as his successor. However, Tessensohn also resigned, after which Hugh Ransome Stanley Zehnder, who he had nominated, was elected president. In August, Tessensohn was officially elected the president of the Singapore Recreation Club. He retired from Boustead and Company in February 1937. He received the King George VI Coronation Medal as a municipal commissioner in May 1937. In April 1939, Tessensohn resigned from the Municipal Commission on account of ill health. He retired from the Singapore Recreation Club the following month.

== Personal life and death ==
Tessensohn was married by January 1909. In that month, his daughter died. He had died in 1943, for his wife Elizabeth de Souza (born 1873) survived him by two years, only to die in October 1945 and his grandson was George Bogaars via his daughter Edwina Marie Tessensohn-Bogaars (1898 – 1959), who was the wife of George Edward Bogaars (1900 – 1971).
