= Tan Thoon Lip =

Singaporean lawyer (1910–1959)

John Tan Thoon Lip
- Tan as Registrar of the Supreme Court
- Born: Tan Thoon Lip; 22 February 1910; Singapore, Straits Settlements, British Malaya
- Died: 14 March 1959 (aged 49); Singapore General Hospital, Outram, Colony of Singapore
- Education: St John's College, Cambridge (LLB, BA)

Chinese name
- Traditional Chinese: 陳敦立
- Simplified Chinese: 陈敦立
Transcriptions
Standard Mandarin
- Hanyu Pinyin: Chén Dūnlì
- IPA: [ʈʂʰə̌n.twə́n.lî]

John Tan Thoon Lip (Note: Chinese: see Chinese name and romanisations) (22 February 1910 – 14 March 1959) was a Singaporean lawyer and the first locally-born registrar of the Supreme Court.

== Early life and education ==
On 22 February 1910, John Tan Thoon Lip was born into a Chinese family, and his sister was Maggie Tan. His father, Tan Kwee Swee, was the grandson of businessman Tan Kim Ching and great-grandson of philanthropist Tan Tock Seng.

Tan studied at the Anglo-Chinese School and later at Raffles Instituition (RI). In 1926, Tan completed a Senior Cambridge with honours.

In 1929, Tan was the first Queen's Scholar from Singapore since its revival in 1924, and he also broke the monopoly of Queen's Scholars coming from Penang schools in the past five years. To celebrate his achievement, RI declared a holiday on 24 January 1930. On 8 August 1930, Tan left Singapore for England on SS Kalyan, and enrolled in St. John's College to study law. In August 1933 and August 1934 respectively, Tan obtained a Bachelor of Arts and a Bachelor of Laws.

== Career ==
In 1934, together with Stanley Toft Stewart, both individuals were the first two to be selected to work in the Straits Settlements Civil Service, and Tan was appointed to work as an assistant official assignee in the court. On 10 August 1935, Tan was enrolled as an advocate and solicitor of the Supreme Court.

In December 1936, Tan was transferred to Malacca. Shortly after, on 1 March 1937, Tan was transferred back to Singapore to be appointed as the first Chinese locally-born magistrate. During the Japanese occupation of Singapore, Tan worked in the Office of the Custodian of Enemy Property, but was soon arrested in late 1942. Tan was accused of corruption and interrogated about a Japanese colleague that was distrusted by the Japanese authorities, and he was also starved, beaten and waterboarded while in custody. Upon his release, he was offered a job by the Japanese to work in the Military Administration, and Tan accepted the job for his own safety.

In October 1947, Tan was promoted from the Straits Settlements Legal Service to the Colonial Legal Service, and in November 1947, Tan was promoted to serve as the acting registrar of the Supreme Court. On 13 January 1951, Tan was the first locally-born individual to be serve as registrar of the Supreme Court. To deal with a congestion in Singapore's courts, Tan sent an urgent request to the Colonial Secretary of Singapore Wilfred Lawson Blythe for three more magistrates. Tan was also sent to New South Wales by Chief Minister David Marshall to study the free legal aid system, and the Free Legal Aid Bill was passed on 6 June 1956 based on recommendations provided by Tan.

On 14 January 1957, Tan retired as registrar because of ill health.

== Personal life ==
On 14 March 1959, Tan died at the General Hospital after battling a long illness. An orchid hybrid, Vanda memoria Tan Thoon Lip, was named after him.

== Bibliography ==
- Tan, Thoon Lip (1946). Kempeitai Kindness. Singapore: Malayan Law Journal.
