= Hugh Ransome Stanley Zehnder =

Singaporean lawyer (1879–1963)

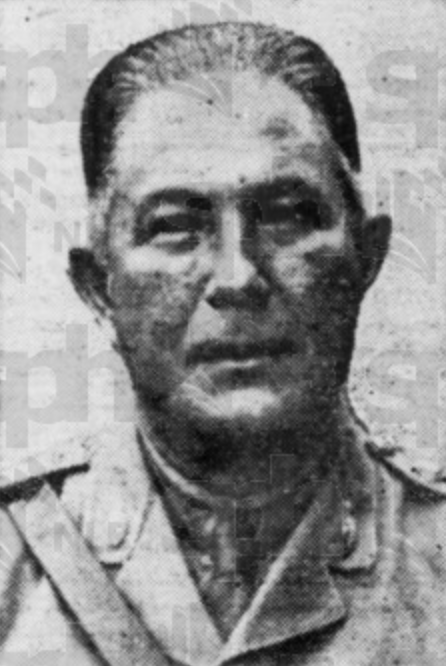
Zehnder in 1936.

Hugh Ransome Stanley Zehnder (27 August 1879 – 20 October 1963) was a lawyer, a Major in the Straits Settlement Volunteer Force and a member of the first Singapore Advisory Council. A prominent member of the Eurasian community of Singapore, he was a founding member and later president of the Eurasian Association, the third representative of the community in the Legislative Council of the Straits Settlements and a founder of the Singapore Volunteer Corp's Eurasian Company.

== Early life ==
Zehnder was born in Sarawak, Malaysia on 27 August 1879. He was the son of a Swiss-Anglican missionary and was of Eurasian descent.

== Career ==
Zehnder came to Singapore in August 1909. He was called to the local bar on 23 May 1910. He and his brother founded the Zehnder Brothers law firm. He joined the Singapore Volunteer Corps and soon achieved the rank of sergeant. In 1918, Zehnder founded the corps' Eurasian company with Edwin Tessensohn and Noel L. Clarke to aid in the World War I war effort. He was then promoted to the rank of second lieutenant in July 1919. Zehnder was a founding member of the Eurasian Association and was elected a member of its committee at its first general meeting, held in November. In November 1921, he became a member of the committee of St. Andrew's House. Zehnder was appointed acting captain while in command of the Eurasian Company of the Singapore Volunteer Corps in September 1927. In June of the following year, he was officially promoted to the rank of Captain. In June 1930, Zehnder was conferred the OBE for his work with the Singapore Volunteer Corps and its Eurasian Company. He was elected to the Singapore Bar Committee in June 1933.

In April 1936, Zehnder was appointed the Eurasian representative on the Legislative Council of the Straits Settlements, succeeding Clarke, whose term had expired and was no longer eligible for re-election. Zehnder was the third to serve in this position. The following month, he was elected the president of the Eurasian Association at an extraordinary general meeting as Reginald Tessensohn, who was to succeed Clarke in this position, had also resigned. Tessensohn had proposed that Zehnder be elected president, believing him to be the "right person to occupy the presidency of the Association", and he was elected with only one dissenting vote, with Claude Henry da Silva being elected vice-president. In February 1937, he was appointed a member of the Council of Raffles College. Zehnder received the King George VI Coronation Medal in May. In June 1939, he was succeeded by da Silva as the Legislative Council's Eurasian representative. Zehnder had resigned from the council on "medical grounds." He and da Silva were appointed the Eurasian representatives on the General Committee of the Malaya Patriotic Fund in October.

In November 1945, after the end of the Japanese Occupation of Singapore, the Singapore Advisory Council was established and Zehnder was appointed a member. He claimed that he would advocate for the reopening of the Probate Court, believing it to be an "urgent matter", and the revival of both the Public Trustee and Estate Duty Ordinances. In the same month, he was elected the vice-president of the Eurasian Association under da Silva. By January of the following year, Zehnder was appointed the chairman of the Rent Assessment Board, which covered both the rural and municipal districts of the island. In April, he was appointed a Civil District Judge following the reopening of the Civil District Court. He then resigned from the Singapore Advisory Council and was replaced by fellow lawyer E. R. Koek later that month. In September 1947, Zehnder was appointed the president of the Rent Conciliation Board, formed under the Control of Rent Ordinance 1947. He retired at the end of April, after which he was succeeded in this position by A. W. Bellamy.

== Personal life and death ==
Zehnder married Ethel Louise Daly at the St. Andrew's Cathedral on 28 December 1915. Daly was the sister of Noel L. Clarke's wife. He owned a "considerable" amount of land off Pasir Panjang Road. He lived on Pasir Panjang Hill and his residence was named "Greystones". After retiring at the end of April 1948, Zehnder left Singapore and settled in England. Zehnder died in Jamaica in October 1963. Zehnder road in the Pasir Panjang area was named for him.
