= Tan Boo Liat =

Singaporean businessman and philanthropist

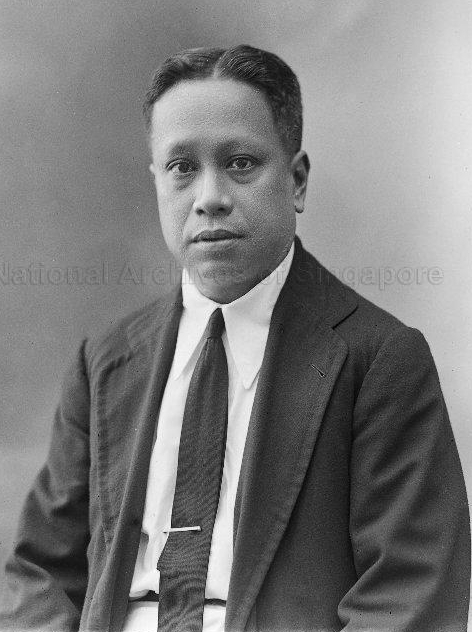
Portrait of Tan by Lee Brothers Studio.

Tan Boo Liat (Chinese: 陳武烈; pinyin: Chén Wǔliè, 1875 – 3 October 1934) was a wealthy Singaporean Chinese philanthropist. He was the son of Tan Soon Toh (Chinese: 陳純道; pinyin: Chén Chúndào), grandson of Tan Kim Ching and great-grandson of Tan Tock Seng.

Educated in Singapore, Tan was a member of the Singapore Volunteer Infantry and was among the contingent present at King Edward's coronation. As a descendant of the illustrious Tan Tock Seng family, he was the leader of the Hokkien Chinese community in Singapore, and chairman of the Po Chiak Keng Committee of Management, which the temple was built as the Tan clan ancestral temple and association. He was also a strong supporter of Dr. Sun Yat-sen, being a member of the Singapore Tongmenghui along with Lim Boon Keng and Dr. S. C. Yin and a president of the Kuomintang in Singapore. He headed the Fukien Protection Fund together with Tan Kah Kee collecting $130,000 during a nine-month campaign. He was appointed by the Government of the Republic of China as a member of the Overseas Chinese Affairs Commission (OCAC) on 31 August 1931 due to his prominent leadership in the Singapore Chinese diaspora and his deep political and financial support for Sun Yat-sen’s revolutionary movement. On 2 April 1932, he was formally removed as a member of the OCAC but was immediately re-appointed during an administrative reshuffle of the executive branches.

Tan was a trustee of the Anglo-Chinese School's Boarding School. Together with Lim, Sir Song Ong Siang and a few other Straits-born Chinese leaders, he initiated the Singapore Chinese Girls' School. He also proposed the establishment of the Tao Nan School

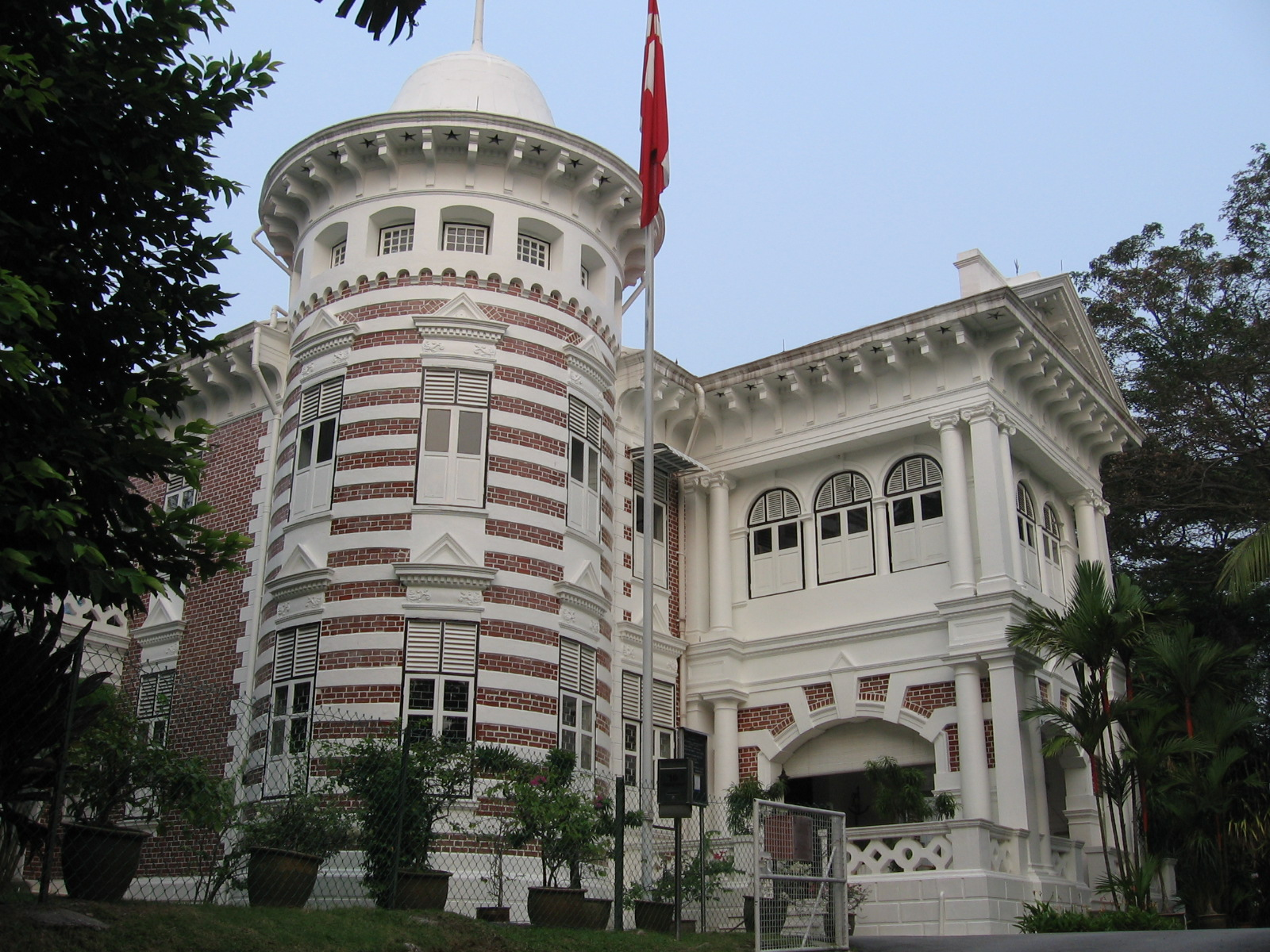
The former Golden Bell Mansion on Mount Faber, which is now occupied by the Danish Seamen's Church

Tan had a stable of a dozen racehorses. In 1898 his famous horse, Vanitas won the Viceroy's cup in Calcutta, India, the first time that a horse from the Straits Settlements or the Federated Malay States won this trophy, earning Tan Boo Liat $100,000.

Tan had strong commercial links to Thailand and was honoured by the King of Thailand, two of the things he had in common with his famous grandfather Tan Kim Ching. In 1920 he was awarded the title Phra Anukul Sayamkich.

== Personal life ==
Tan's sister, Lilian Tan Luck Neo, married Seow Poh Leng and later died of Influenza during a flu epidemic in Singapore. Tan's daughter, Polly Tan Poh Li, then married the widowed Seow.

Tan owned Golden Bell Mansion (built 1901) on Pender Road at the Mount Washington side of Mount Faber, Singapore. Sun Yat-sen stayed there on 15 December 1911 as did his wife and daughters (February 1912). After his death in Shanghai in 1934, the house was sold. It is currently occupied by the Danish Seaman's Mission.

== Death and burial ==
Tan Boo Liat died in Shanghai, China on 3 October 1934. He was cremated and his remains were brought back to Singapore on 19 October 1934. His funeral was held on the following day and he was interred at the Bukit Brown Municipal Cemetery.
