= George Bogaars =

Singaporean intelligence officer (1926–1992)

George Bogaars PBC PJG
- c. 1974

Director of the Special Branch
- In office 1 August 1960 – 9 August 1965
- Prime Minister: Lee Kuan Yew
- Preceded by: Eric John Linsell
- Succeeded by: Position abolished

Head of the Singapore Civil Service
- In office August 1968 – July 1975
- Prime Minister: Lee Kuan Yew
- Preceded by: Stanley Toft Stewart
- Succeeded by: Howe Yoon Chong

Personal details
- Born: George Edwin Bogaars; 25 October 1926 Singapore, Straits Settlements
- Died: 6 April 1992 (aged 65) Singapore
- Spouse: Dorothy Lee Kian Neo (divorced 1977)
- Children: 3
- Relatives: Edwin Tessensohn (maternal great-grandfather); Reginald Tessensohn (maternal grandfather)
- Education: University of Malaya (BA, MA)

George Edwin Bogaars PBC PJG (25 October 1926 – 6 April 1992) was a Singaporean intelligence officer and bureaucrat. From 1961 to 1965, he served as the head of the Ministry of Home Affairs' Special Branch and oversaw Operation Coldstore. He subsequently led the Singapore Civil Service and was instrumental in the establishment of the Singapore Armed Forces. Bogaars was also the director of Keppel Shipyard and the National Iron and Steel Mills. Between 1980 and 1985, he suffered a heart attack and three strokes, and remained in poor health for the rest of his life. In 1992, Bogaars died of heart failure, aged 65.

== Early life and education ==
George Edwin Bogaars was born on 25 October 1926 in Singapore. Bogaars' first name was taken from his father, George Edward Bogaars (1900 – 1971), who was the secretary to the Governor of the Straits Settlements and the Federated Malay States, while his middle name was taken from his great-grandfather, Edwin Tessensohn. Bogaars attended the Convent of the Holy Infant Jesus, Saint Patrick's School, and St. Joseph's Institution. During the Japanese occupation of Malaya in 1943, Bogaars was forced to relocate from Singapore to Bahau with his father and his younger brother, Brian.

The Bogaars spent three-and-a-half years in Bahau and lived off their own farm produce, which included maize, sweet potatoes, and tapioca. After the war, the younger George Bogaars returned to Singapore and obtained a Raffles College Scholarship. He enrolled at the University of Malaya, graduating in 1951 with a Bachelor of Arts in history. A year later, he received a Shell Fellowship to pursue a Master of Arts in history at the same university. Bogaars became one of the first two students to receive an MA from the University of Malaya.

== Career ==
Bogaars had hoped to pursue an academic career but in 1952, at his father's insistence, he joined the Ministry of Commerce and Industry as a new member of the Administrative Service. Three years later, he was appointed as secretary of the Board of Currency Commissioners (Malaya and Borneo) at the Ministry of Finance.

On 1 August 1960, Bogaars succeeded Eric John Linsell as director of the Ministry of Home Affairs' Special Branch, becoming the first Singaporean without any prior experience in intelligence to assume the role. In 1962, Bogaars was awarded with both the Meritorious Service Medal and the Malaysia Medal. As head of the Special Branch, Bogaars oversaw Operation Coldstore, a covert operation that led to the arrests of more than a hundred suspected communist sympathisers. Following Singapore's separation from Malaysia in 1965, Bogaars was appointed Permanent Secretary to the Ministry of Defence under Goh Keng Swee. While at the Ministry of Defence, Bogaars played a crucial role in the establishment of the Singapore Armed Forces (SAF) and its training institute.

In 1967, the History Association of Singapore was established and Bogaars was elected as its first president. The same year, he was awarded the Distinguished Service Medal. In August 1968, he became the head of the Singapore Civil Service, a post that he held until 1975. In 1970, Bogaars was appointed as the director of Keppel Shipyard. During his tenure, Keppel became the largest ship repair company in the country, although it also amassed a debt of nearly S$845 million following its S$408 million acquisition of Straits Steamship in 1983—the most expensive corporate takeover in Singapore at the time.

Bogaars left the Ministry of Defence in 1970 to become Permanent Secretary (Economic Development) at the Ministry of Finance. According to Lim Kim San, Bogaars's departure from the Ministry of Defence was due to his failure to restrict the conscription of Malays into the SAF—an especially sensitive issue following the 1969 race riots of Singapore. Lee Kuan Yew elaborated in his memoirs:

We had over-recruited Malays into the SAF ... George Bogaars, then PS MID and one of our most trusted officers, had been Special Branch Director where he learnt to distrust the Chinese-educated because nearly all communists were Chinese educated. He preferred Malays when recruiting non-commissioned officers and warrant officers for the SAF to train our national servicemen, believing the Chinese-educated were prone to communism and chauvinism. This bias had to be redressed, a sensitive task which we entrusted to a team headed by Bogaars. A young Lieutenant Colonel, Edward Yong, implemented a plan that over several years reduced the proportion of Malays, mainly by recruiting more non-Malays.

In 1973, Bogaars was appointed Permanent Secretary at the Ministry of Foreign Affairs. Bogaars resigned from his position as head of the Civil Service in July 1975 and was succeeded by Howe Yoon Chong. In 1978, Bogaars returned to the Ministry of Finance again, where he remained until his retirement.

== Later years and legacy ==
After retiring from public service on 25 October 1981, Bogaars took on directorships at several other companies, including Acma Electrical Industries, Chemical Far East, DBS Bank, and the National Iron and Steel Mills. He resigned from Keppel in May 1984 and all of his remaining public roles a year later.

On 7 March 1985, Bogaars was admitted to Singapore General Hospital after suffering a heart attack. He suffered a third stroke in November of the same year, which left him partially paralysed and temporarily unable to speak. On 6 April 1992, having spent the previous five weeks in hospital, Bogaars died of heart failure, aged 65. In 2015, the George Bogaars Professorship in History was established at the National University of Singapore.

== Family ==
Bogaars was a Catholic. He was married to Dorothy Lee Kian Neo (d. 2019), who was a Chinese Singaporean and they lived together at Bukit Timah. In 1971, Lee filed for divorce. The divorce was finalised in February 1977 and Lee was awarded full custody of their two daughters and one son.

== Selected works and publications ==
- Bogaars, George (1955). "The Effect of the Opening of the Suez Canal on the Trade and Development of Singapore". Journal of the Malayan Branch of the Royal Asiatic Society. 28 (1): 99–143.
