= 金鐘 (disambiguation) =

金鐘 may refer to:

- Admiralty, Hong Kong
- Admiralty station (MTR), MTR station in Admiralty, Hong Kong
- Golden Bell Awards (金鐘獎), annual Taiwanese television and radio production award
- Kim Ching, Chinese given name of Tan Kim Ching, Chinese politician and businessman
