= W. A. Fell =

British politician

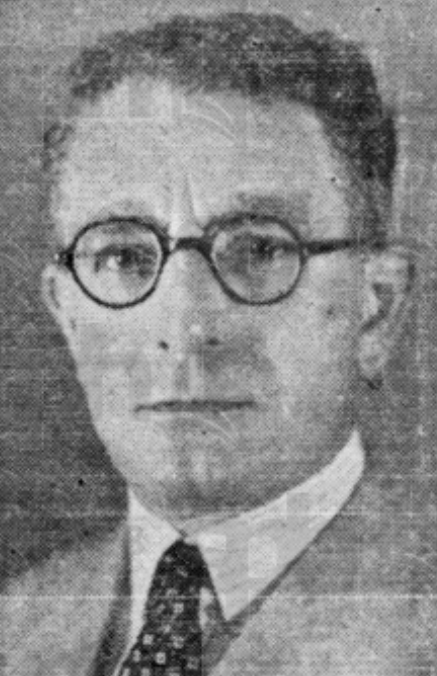
Fell in 1940

W. A. Fell was a member of the Executive Council of the Straits Settlements and the Legislative Council of the Straits Settlements, the director of several companies and the Director-general of the Department of Supply during World War II.

== Career ==
Fell arrived in British Malaya in 1908 and served as the director of Adamson Gilfillian & Co. for several years. He served on the Penang Harbour Board in 1920. He then served on the Singapore Harbour Board for 13 years, and as a committee member of the Singapore Chamber of Commerce for 15 years.

He was made an unofficial member of the Legislative Council of the Straits Settlements in 1929. He was made an honorary unofficial member of the council in 1930, and held the role until his term expired in 1936, after which he was replaced by A. E. Thornley-Jones.

He and Chan Sze Jin were appointed temporary unofficial members of the Executive Council of the Straits Settlements in place of Tan Cheng Lock and Arnold P. Robinson in June 1935. He was replaced by Richard Williamson in 1937. He was a member of the Singapore Improvement Trust from its establishment in 1927 to 1937.

He was a Justice of the Peace, as well as the director of Harper Gilfillan & Co. In April 1939, he was made a temporary member of the Advisory Committee of the Malayan Rubber Fund in place of W. E. Wallis, who was on leave. He was conferred the CBE in June. In 1941, he was appointed the Director-general of the Department of Supply.
