= Claude Henry da Silva =

Singaporean lawyer (1891–1980)

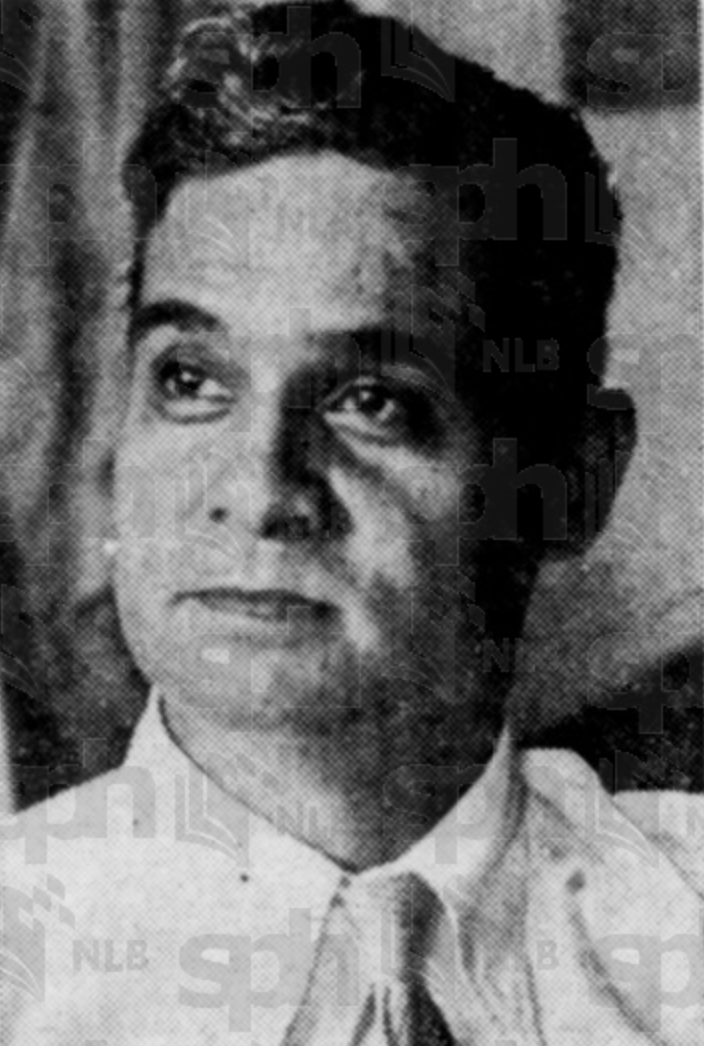
- Da Silva in 1939
- Born: 1891; Sandakan, North Borneo
- Died: 28 July 1980 (aged 88–89); Gleneagles Hospital, Singapore
- Resting place: Choa Chu Kang Cemetery
- Spouse(s): Olga Martens (m. 1917; died 1922); Nellie Mark (m. 1932)
- Children: 3

Claude Henry da Silva (1891 – 28 July 1980) was a Singaporean lawyer, a member of both the Legislative Council of the Straits Settlements and the Municipal Commission of Singapore, and the president of both the Eurasian Association and the Singapore Recreation Club.

== Early life and education ==
Da Silva was born in Sandakan in Sabah in 1891. He was the son of Claude Antonio da Silva, the managing director of C. A. Ribeiro & Co.. He studied at the St. Joseph's Institution in Singapore and won the Queen's Scholarship in 1907. Da Silva then left for England where he began studying at Christ's College in Cambridge. He graduated from the college with a Bachelor of Laws in 1910. He passed the bar finals with first-class honours and was called to the bar in 1912.

== Career ==
Da Silva returned to Singapore in 1912. In 1919, he became a partner in the law firm Battenberg & Talma, which became Battenberg & da Silva. From 1925 to 1930, he served as the vice-president and then as the president of the Singapore Recreation Club. He continued to serve as a member of the club's committee after retiring as president. From 1926 to 1931, he served on the Social Hygiene Board. Following his resignation, he was replaced by William Fabian Mosbergen.

From 1926 to 1935, he served on the Education Board. He was appointed a member in place of Walter Makepeace and was replaced by Noel L. Clarke following his resignation. In 1936, he became a partner of the prominent law firm Da Silva, Oehlers & Chua. By 1939, he had served as a member Municipal Commission of Singapore twice. In April 1939, he was appointed the Eurasian representative of the Legislative Council of the Straits Settlements, replacing Major Hugh Ransome Stanley Zehnder. In the 1940s, he served on the committee of the Singapore Silver Jubilee Fund.

Da Silva served as the vice-president and later as the president of the Eurasian Association. He helped Gilbert Shelley found the Eurasian Association's Eurasian Youth Movement. He was a committee member of the Oxford and Cambridge Society of Malaya. He was a member of the councils of the King Edward VII College of Medicine and Raffles College. He was also the president of the Christian Brothers Old Boy's Association. He was an advocate for the provision of better education to Eurasians. During a speech made at the Singapore Recreation Club in November 1934, he stated: "We must give up the idea that the Eurasian is privileged. He is not, and the sooner he gets that idea out of his head the better. They cannot succeed unless they put their shoulders to the wheel." He was also a supporter of the Eurasian Women's Association.

On 2 February 1940, he was a guest on The War From Various Viewpoints, a radio series broadcast on the British Malaya Broadcasting Corporation. Following the end of WWII, da Silva retired from legal practice. In 1948, he was elected as vice-president of the Progressive Party.

== Personal life and death ==
In 1917, da Silva married Olga Martens, with whom he had one daughter. However, Martens died of pneumonia on 31 July 1922. In 1932, he married Nellie Mark, with whom he had two daughters, in St. Moritz, Switzerland. He died at Gleneagles Hospital on 28 July 1980 and was buried at the Choa Chu Kang Cemetery.
