= Chan Sze Jin =

Singaporean lawyer and politician (1886–1948)

Chan Sze Jin CMG
- 陈祀仁
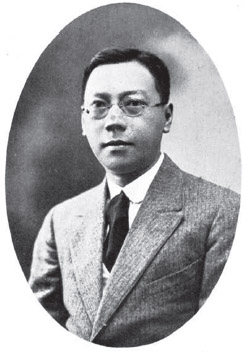
- Born: 6 September 1886; Raj of Sarawak
- Died: 26 September 1948 (aged 62); Emerald Hill Road, Colony of Singapore
- Resting place: Bidadari Cemetery
- Education: Downing College (BA, LLB)
- Occupation: Lawyer

Chan Sze Jin CMG (6 September 1886 – 26 September 1948) was a lawyer and a politician. He was a member of the Legislative Council of Singapore, and was the first lawyer in private practice to be conferred the CMG. He was also the second lawyer to be conferred the CMG, after Thomas Braddell, and the fourth Chinese to be conferred the CMG, after Hoo Ah Kay, Tan Jiak Kim and Loke Yew.

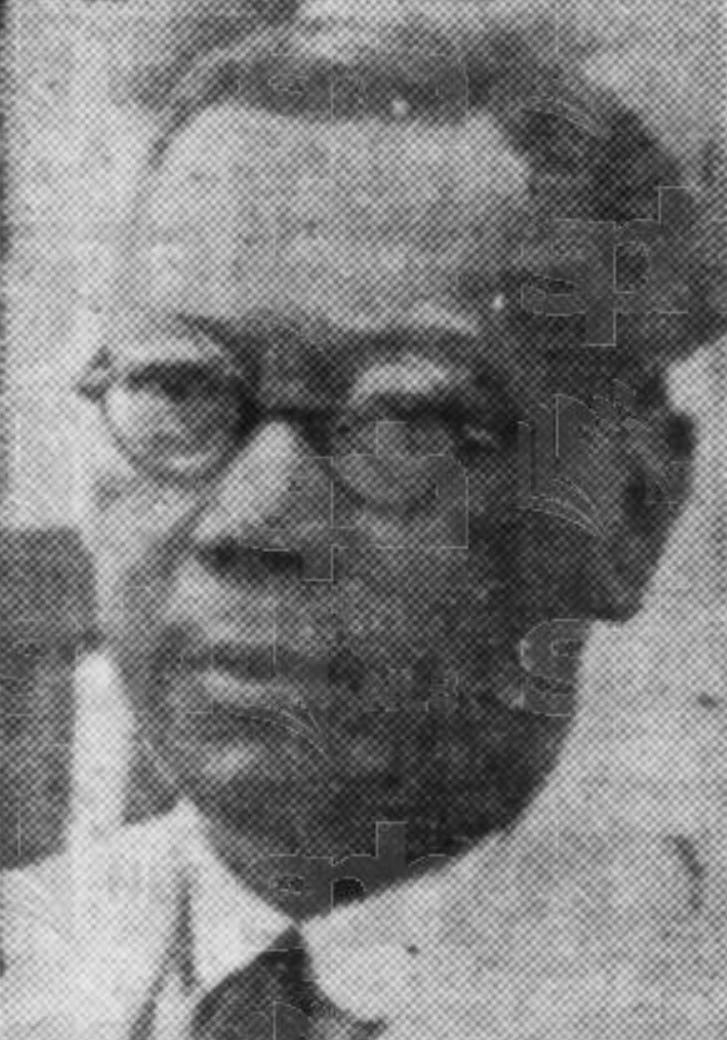
Chan Sze Jin

== Early life and education ==
Chan was born on 6 September 1886 in Sarawak as the son of Chan Fook Nyan, who was the Chief Clerk of the Kuala Lumpur Sanitary Board and later an inspector for the Chinese Secretariat in Singapore. He was the younger brother of Chan Sze Kiong, who was the Chief Clerk of the firm D. G. Robertson & Co., and Chan Sze Pong, a doctor, and the elder brother of Chan Sze Onn, a prominent businessman and chartered accountant. His godfather was British colonial administrator Sir John Pickersgill Rodger.

He attended Victoria Institution in Kuala Lumpur, and won the Teacher Scholarship at the age of 12 in 1898. He then proceeded to win the Rodger Medal, which had been instituted by his godfather in 1985, five times in a row. In 1901, Chan left Victoria Institution to attend the Penang Free School in Penang, as Victoria Institution did not offer a Queen's Scholarship class. He won the Queen's Scholarship for 1904, and left for England to study at Downing College in Cambridge. He took his BA and LLB examinations in 1907, and then his Law Tripos and his History Tripos Part II the following year. Later that year, he left for London in order to attend Gray's Inn, and was called to the bar there in 1910, after winning a 100-guinea studentship for three years for the highest place for his final examinations.

== Career ==
Chan moved to Singapore and was admitted to the Bar in Singapore on 20 March 1911, and established a law firm named Chan & Swee Teow the following year with Wee Swee Teow. He was elected the president of the Straits Chinese Recreation Club in 1919. By then, he had been on the Board of Trustees of the Gan Eng Seng School, then known as the Anglo-Chinese Free School, for several years. Following the end of his partnership with Wee in 1920, he established the law firm Chan & Eber with Reynold Lionel Eber. He was appointed a member of the British Malaya Opium Advisory Committee in December 1926.

Chan was nominated to be a member of the Legislative Council of Singapore in place of Song Ong Siang on 29 October 1927. His three-year term ended in 1930, after which he was replaced by Wee. While he was in the legislative council, he help to draft the Children's Ordinance. In 1932, he became the first president of the Singapore Island Country Club. He and W. A. Fell were appointed temporary unofficial members of the Executive Council in 1935, replacing Tan Cheng Lock and Sir Arnold P. Robinson. His three-year term ended in 1938, after which he was again reappointed for a three-year term. However, due to ill health, he resigned from his position in the Executive Council in 1940. He was conferred the CMG in 1941. Then governor of the Straits Settlements Sir Shenton Thomas personally conferred the honour on him at his residence. This made him the first lawyer in private practice to be conferred the CMG, the second lawyer to be conferred the CMG, after Thomas Braddell, and the fourth Chinese to be conferred the CMG, after Hoo Ah Kay, Tan Jiak Kim and Loke Yew.

== Personal life and death ==
Chan resided on Emerald Hill Road. He was married and had seven daughters and one son. He and his brothers Sze Pong and Sze Onn were prominent members of the Chinese community in Singapore, and were known as the "Chan Brothers".

His health begun to deteriorate in June 1948, and he died on 26 September 1948. His funeral was held the next day at Bidadari Cemetery, and was officiated by Reverend Goh Hood Keng. It was attended by over 1,000 people.
