= Tanjong Pagar Dock Company =

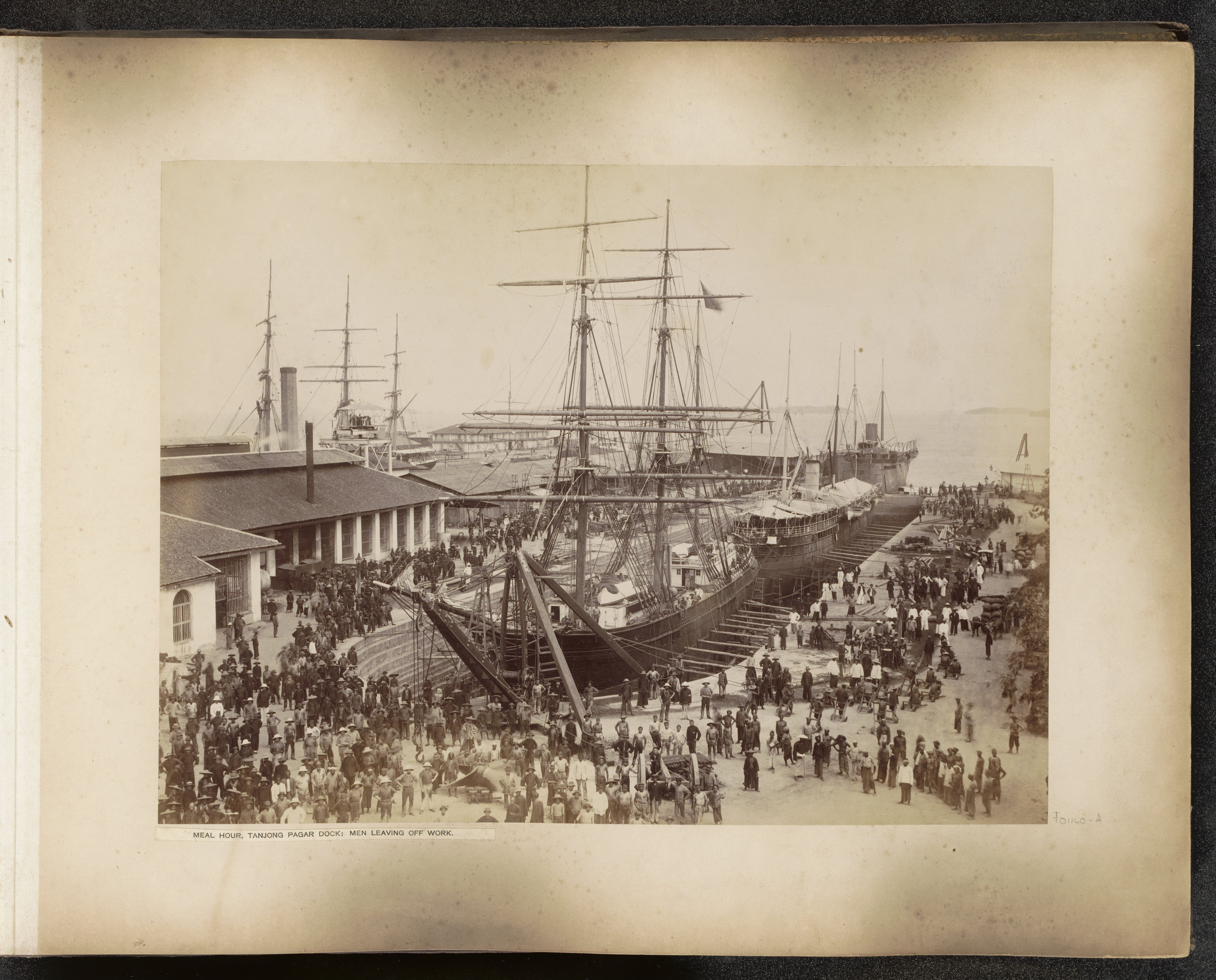
- Drydock of Tanjong Pagar Co. c. 1890-1905
- Industry: Ship repairs
- Founded: 1864
- Founder: Guthrie and Company and Tan Kim Ching
- Fate: expropriated 1905
- Successor: Maritime & Port Authority
- Headquarters: Singapore

The Tanjong Pagar Dock Company, (1864–1905), the forerunner of today's Maritime and Port Authority of Singapore, was founded by Guthrie and Company and Tan Kim Ching. The company was expropriated by the Government in 1905 who replaced it with the Tanjong Pagar Dock Board.

== History ==
The nutmeg plantations at Tanjong Pagar gradually transformed into a harbor due to the availability of deep water for steamer traffic as well as the growing congestion in the Singapore River Many wharves and docks were built and several dock companies were founded but none was as successful as the Tanjong Pagar Dock Company (renamed Singapore Harbor Board in 1913, and eventually renamed as Port of Singapore Authority in 1964)

The Tanjong Pagar Dock Company grew and eventually became the largest docking and wharfing company in four decades; it even has their own Police Force and Fire Brigade. The dock's police force, Tanjong Pagar Dock Police, housed at the Tanjong Pagar Dock Police Station at the junction of then Goodwin Road and Entrance Road comprises mostly Sikhs from Punjab, the heart of India's Sikh community. Many of these Sikhs eventually settled down to form the Sikh community in Singapore today.
