= Stanley Toft Stewart =

Singaporean civil servant (1910–1992)

Stanley Toft Stewart PJG CMG
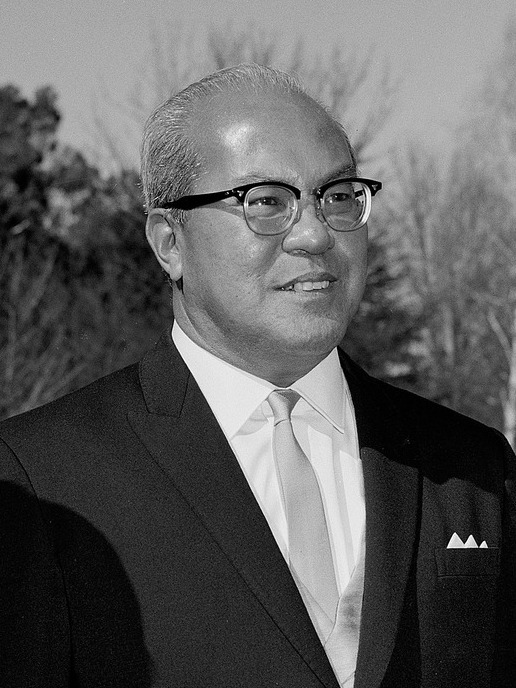
- Stewart in 1966
- Born: 13 June 1910; Penang, Straits Settlements, British Malaya
- Died: 9 February 1992 (aged 81); Singapore
- Education: Raffles College; St. Xavier's Institution
- Spouse: Therese Zelie de Souza (m. 1935)
- Children: 7

Stanley Toft Stewart PJG CMG (13 June 1910 – 9 February 1992) was a Singaporean civil servant, diplomat and district officer of Butterworth and Balik Pulau.

Stewart served as the permanent secretary in the Ministry of Home Affairs (1959–1963), Prime Minister's Office (1963–1964), and Ministry of Foreign Affairs (1969–1972). Stewart was also the first high commissioner to Australia from 1966 to 1969.

== Early life and education ==
Stanley Toft Stewart was born in Penang on 13 June 1910, and he was the eldest son. His father, Charles Campbell Stewart, was an office assistant in the resident councillor's office of Penang, and his mother, Jeanette Matilda Doral, was the third daughter of Maximo Peter Doral, a clerk.

Stewart received his early education at St. Xavier's Institution. During the school's annual sports competition in 1929, Stewart won first place in a 100 yards (91 m) dash and set a shot put school record after he threw 33 feet 11.5 inches (10.35 m). In 1933, Stewart broke his own shot put record by 7 inches (0.18 m). He graduated with a School Certificate in 1928.

In 1933, Stewart graduated from Raffles College with a diploma in arts.

== Career ==
In 1934, Stewart was supposed to be one of the two to be appointed as a Queen's Scholar, which would have allowed him to further his studies in the United Kingdom, but he was unsuccessful. Instead, he was one of the first two to be selected to the work in the Straits Settlements Civil Service, and he left Penang for Singapore on 1 October 1934. The other individual selected was Tan Thoon Lip. Stewart was attached to the Land Office under the Ministry of Local Government, Lands and Housing, and in 1936, Stewart was appointed as a police magistrate and assistant district officer of Butterworth. Stewart also remained active in sports by competing against other clubs in bowling and tennis.

In 1939, Stewart was transferred to Balik Pulau, and during the Japanese occupation of Malaya, he remained in the same position, reporting to a Japanese superior. After the war, Stewart was transferred back to Butterworth and promoted to serve as a district officer in the Colonial Administrative Service, one of the first locally born to be appointed for the position.

In 1957, Stewart became the deputy chief secretary and acting chief secretary of Singapore. During a debate in the 1st Legislative Assembly of Singapore on 17 December 1957, he had to defend a S$13 million defence budget, claiming that Singapore needed local defence forces for internal security, as the British was only responsible for Singapore's external defence.

In 1959, Stewart was appointed as the permanent secretary in the Ministry of Home Affairs, and he was involved in merger talks alongside other government officials such as Prime Minister Lee Kuan Yew and Minister for Finance Goh Keng Swee. In 1963, Stewart was appointed as the permanent secretary in the Prime Minister's Office and head of civil service, before officially retiring in 1964.

After Singapore gained its independence, the government began recruiting public servants from various government departments to form its initial cohort of diplomats. In August 1966, Stewart was appointed as Singapore's first high commissioner to Australia, and he expressed his desire to expand trade between both countries through exporting a wider variety of goods from Singapore, such as electronics and confectionery. Stewart returned three years later to become the permanent secretary in the Ministry of Foreign Affairs (MFA). During his tenure, Stewart was involved in discussions to split Malaysia–Singapore Airlines. Stewart also proposed the establishment of a distinct class of professional diplomats, leading to the creation of a foreign diplomatic service. This initiative formalised the recruitment of career diplomats, establishing a separate and specialised diplomatic corps.

In 1972, Stewart left MFA and became the chief executive of the National Stadium Corporation, overseeing the construction and opening of the National Stadium. His last appointment before retiring in 1973 was as the chief executive director of the Singapore Sports Council.

== Personal life ==
In 1935, Stewart married Therese Zelie de Souza (born 1913) and they had seven daughters.

Stewart died of a heart attack on 9 February 1992. His wife died on 9 September 2018 at the age of 105 and she was the oldest Eurasian Singaporean.

== Awards and decorations ==
- Meritorious Service Medal, in 1962.
- Companion of the Most Distinguished Order of St Michael and St George, in 1958.
