= Noel L. Clarke =

Singaporean politician (1885–1960)

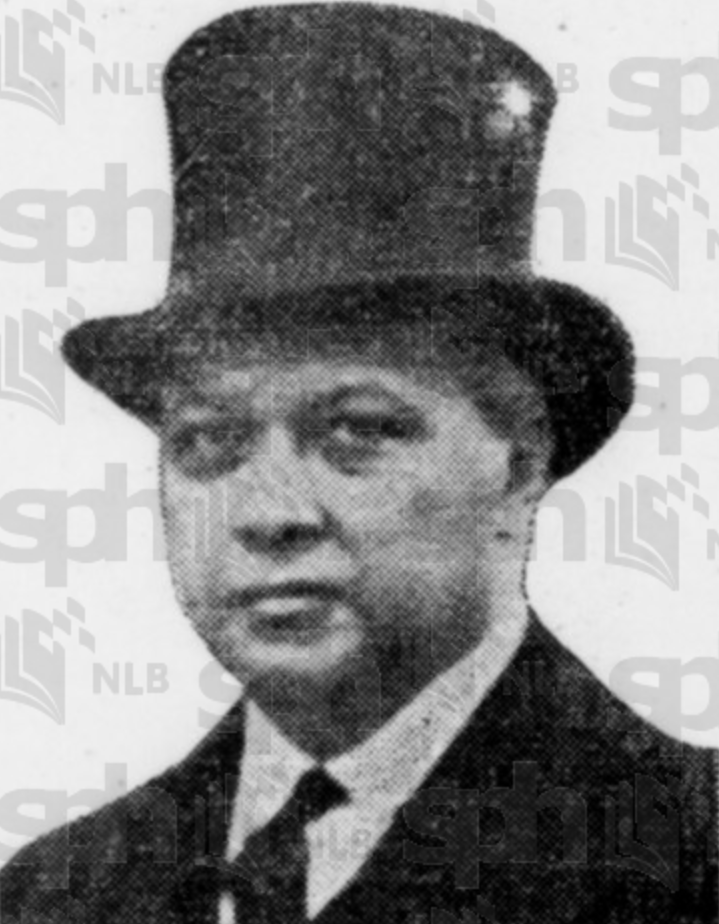
Clarke in 1939

Noel Leicester Clarke (1 June 1885 – 23 February 1960) was a doctor, member of the Legislative Council of the Straits Settlements and leader of the Eurasian community of Singapore. He served as the president of both the Eurasian Association and the Singapore Recreation Club.

== Early life and education ==
Clarke was born the fifth son of Francis Clarke on 1 June 1885. He studied at the Raffles Institution in Singapore before winning the Queen's Scholarship in 1904. He then left for England and began studying at Christ's College, Cambridge and later at the Royal London Hospital.

== Career ==
After returning from England, Clarke began practising in Singapore. He served as a member of the Municipal Commission of Singapore from 1921 to 1926. In 1922, he became a committee member of the Straits Settlements Association. From 1922 to 1923, he served as a representative on the Malaya branch of the British Medical Association. In 1925, he served on the Straits Settlements and Federated Malay States Medical Council. He became the council's vice-president in 1928. In 1927, he served on the King Edward VII College of Medicine Council.

In February 1927, he was appointed the Eurasian representative of the Legislative Council of the Straits Settlements, replacing John Edwin Tessensohn, who died in September 1926 and was the first Eurasian representative to the council. He served three terms on the council and was replaced by Major Hugh Ransome Stanley Zehnder in 1936 as his term expired in April of that year. He advocated for the abolishment of the Colour Bar, the restoration of the Queen's Scholarship and self-government. In November 1935, he was appointed a member of the Education Board in place of Claude Henry da Silva, who had resigned from the board. Clarke served for several years as the president of the Eurasian Association and the Singapore Recreation Club, which were prominent organisations in the local Eurasian community. He and Major Zehnder formed the Eurasian Company of the Singapore Volunteer Corps.

Clarke was the president of the Old Rafflesians' Association. He was a member of the Social Hygiene Advisory Board, the Volunteer Advisory Committee and the Midwives Board and was a justice of the peace. He was also a prominent cricketer and a patron of the Girls' Sports Club.

== Personal life and death ==
Clarke married Maud Alice Daly, the president of the Girls' Sports Club, with whom he had two daughters and one son, cricketer Bertram N. D. Clarke. Speaker of the Legislative Assembly of Singapore and lawyer Sir George Oehlers was a nephew of his. Following Bertram's death in 1940, Clarke retired to England. He died at Guy's Hospital in London on 23 February 1960.
