= HCS Pluto (1822) =

History

United Kingdom
- Name: Pluto
- Owner: British East India Company
- Ordered: 1822
- Builder: Kyd & Co., Kidderpore, Calcutta
- Launched: 1822
- Fate: Destroyed May 1830

General characteristics
- Tons burthen: (bm)
- Installed power: 8 ihp (6.0 kW)
- Propulsion: 2 paddle wheels
- Speed: 4 kn (4.6 mph; 7.4 km/h)
- Armament: 4 × 24-pounder brass carronades + 2 × 6-pounder guns (not in action)

The H[onourable] C[ompany's] S[hip] Pluto was built in 1822 for the British East India Company (EIC) as a steam dredge for Calcutta. The EIC converted her into a floating battery and she served during the first Anglo-Burmese war (1824 to 1826). At the end of the war, the EIC sold her and, her engine having been removed, she became a coal depot. A gale destroyed her in May 1830.

== Origins ==
William Brunton, of the Eagle Foundry at Birmingham, had built a steam engine and boiler designed for a river boat. J&W. Gledstone purchased the engine and Major Davidson of the Bengal Engineers brought the engine to Calcutta around 1817 or 1818. The engine then sat in a warehouse until 1822.

In 1822 the Bengal Government had Kyd & Co., of Kidderpore, build a dredge named Pluto. She was flat-bottomed and had a square front and stern, with steam-driven bucket-chain dredges on each side. When war with Burma broke out in 1824, the EIC had the dredges removed and paddles installed for propulsion. It also had a false bow installed and armed Pluto with six cannon.

Under the command of Lieutenant T.C.Minchall (RN), Pluto served in the EIC squadron under the command of Commodore John Hayes. From early 1825 she towed boats, provided some fire support with her carronades, and on occasion her European crew joined landing parties.

After the war the British East India Company sold Pluto and she became a coal hulk (minus her engines) for Alexander & Co. She sank in a gale in May 1830.

== Alternate account of Pluto's origin ==
Some accounts state that Pluto was the Van der Capellen, built at Batavia in 1810 or 1811 soon after the British invasion of Java, by British merchants. In this account, the government chartered her for two years at a rate of 10,000 dollars a month for general service and the transport of troops. Later, she came into the hands of Major Schlach. Other accounts state that the first steam vessel in Java was the paddle-steamer Van der Capellen, named for Godert van der Capellen, one of the triumvirate commissioners-general of the Dutch East Indies (1816–1819), and then the commissioner–general (1819–1826). She was launched at Kerr's Yard, Surabaya on 23 November 1825 for British merchants. This vessel became the first steam vessel to visit Singapore when she anchored there on 17 April 1827.
