= Harry Wyatt Wunderly =

Australian army medical officer (1892–1971)

Sir Harry Wyatt Wunderly (30 May 1892 – 14 April 1971) was an Australian army medical officer, general practitioner, medical administrator, physician and public servant. Wunderly was born in Hawthorn, Melbourne, Victoria and died in Canberra, Australian Capital Territory. Wunderly was instrumental in the management and reduction of tuberculosis in Australia.
