= Pluto (1870 ship) =

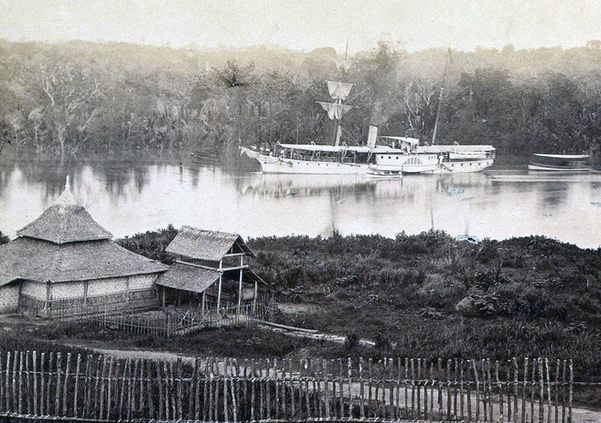
- Colonial Steamer Pluto lying in the Klang River in 1880

History

Straits Settlements
- Name: Pluto
- Namesake: HM Straits Steamer Pluto
- Owner: Straits Settlements
- Ordered: 1870
- Builder: J.G. Laurie, Glasgow
- Launched: 12 August 1870
- Acquired: 4 January 1871

General characteristics
- Tons burthen: 400 (bm)
- Installed power: 100 hp (75 kW)
- Propulsion: 2 side paddle wheels
- Speed: 4–5 knots (7.4–9.3 km/h; 4.6–5.8 mph)

Often erroneously labeled HMS Pluto – Colonial Steamer Pluto was a passenger steamer built in 1870 for the colonial government of the Straits Settlements for service in the East, her accommodation being specially fitted for the use of the governor of the colonies and his officials. She arrived at Singapore for the first time on 4 January 1871.

== Background ==
Unsatisfied with the performance of the steamer Peiho the Governor of the Straits Settlements Harry Ord requested a new steamer to be ordered from England in 1869. This new steamer would be named Pluto as it was seen as a full replacement for the previous HM Straits Steamer Pluto, which had been in use by the Straits Government from 1863 until it was broken up in 1868.

== Service ==
Originally intended for the relief of lighthouses and other government services, when not so employed, the Colonial Office had no objection to the steamer being used for conveyance of the governor. By 1881, Pluto was considered too slow and inefficient to meet the demands of the colony, so a new governor's yacht, Sea Belle, was ordered to replace her. Pluto was used in the Pangkor Treaty of 1874 as the location of the signature of the agreement, considered significant in the history of the Malay states and paved the way for colonization in Malaya.
