= Queen's Scholar (British Malaya and Singapore) =

In British Malaya, a Queen's Scholar was a holder of one of various scholarships awarded by the Government of the Straits Settlements to further their studies in the United Kingdom.

The first scholarships, originally known as the Higher Scholarships, were founded in 1885 by Sir Cecil Clementi Smith, the Governor of the Straits Settlements, in honour of Queen Victoria. The main objectives of introducing Higher Scholarships was to allow promising boys an opportunity to complete their studies in the United Kingdom, and to encourage a number of boys to remain in school and acquire a useful education. From 1885 to 1890, Higher Scholarships were only awarded to the top boys in the Straits Settlement. Thereafter, the Higher Scholarships were renamed the Queen's Scholarships. Recipients of the Queen's Scholarships would proceed to study at either Cambridge or Oxford universities.

The Queen's Scholarships were discontinued in 1911 but restored in 1924, with the scholarship being opened to both genders. In 1940, the selection of Queen's Scholars was transferred to a Board of Selection appointed by the Senate of Raffles College in Singapore. The Queen's Research Fellowships were also introduced for outstanding graduates of Raffles College and King Edward VII College of Medicine (later merged to form the University of Malaya) to study postgraduate courses in selected universities in the United Kingdom. In 1959, the Queen's Scholarship was replaced by the Agong's Scholarship in Malaysia and the Singapore State Scholarship, now the President's Scholarship in Singapore.

== List of British Malayan Queen's Scholars ==
- 1886: Charles Spence Angus (Singapore), James Aitken (Singapore)
- 1887: Dr. Lim Boon Keng, P. V. S. Locke
- 1888: Sir Song Ong Siang (Singapore), Dunstan Alfred Aeria (Penang)
- 1889: H. A. Scott
- 1890: P. P. Mehergee, H. O. Robinson
- 1891: Francis Osmond de Souza (Singapore)
- 1892: A. H. Keun, H. J. Phillips
- 1893: H. C. Keun, Ung Bok Hoey
- 1894: H. A. D. Moore, Koh Leap Teng
- 1895: J. C. J. de Silva
- 1896: Gnoh Lean Tuck (Wu Lien Teh)
- 1897: F. Salzmann, R. Holsington
- 1898: Quah Sin Keat, Phung Chock Kong
- 1899: Goh Lai Hee (Wu Lai Hsi), R. E. Smith
- 1900: W. S. Leicester, M. Foley
- 1901: Yeoh Guan Seok, R. H. McCleland, Chan Sze Pong
- 1902: Tan Seng Suan, Koh Keng Seng
- 1903: W. W. Davidson, W. J. C. Le Cain
- 1904: Lim Guan Cheng, Noel Clarke, Chan Sze Jin
- 1905: E. R. Carlos, R. L. Eber
- 1906: J. R. Aeria, L. Samy
- 1907: Khaw Oo Kek, C. H. Claude de Silva
- 1908: Leong Yew Koh (Perak)
- 1909: Khoo Heng Kok, Stephen O. de Souza
- 1924: Teh Say Koo, Tan Ah Tah
- 1925: Yeoh Cheng Hoe
- 1926: Tan Yeow Bok, Oon Khye Beng
- 1927: Lim Kheng Kooi (Penang), Cheah Heng Sin
- 1928: J. W. D. Ambrose (Penang), Cheah Soon Hock
- 1929: Tan Thoon Lip, Ooi Tiang Eng
- 1930: Maggi Tan, Goh Liang Chuan
- 1931: Chuah Seng Chew, Liew Swee Cheng, Ong Hock Sim
- 1932: Tan Sim Eng, Thora Oehlers, R. Arulandum
- 1933: Keong Siew Tong, B. H. Y. Meggs, H. Jesudason
- 1934: A. V. Winslow, Dr. Lau Fook Khean, B. Ponniah (Seremban)
- 1935: Cyril Noel L'Angellier, Ahmad bin Ibrahim, Ng Yok Hing, Mohd. Suffian bin Hashim
- 1936: Lim Hong Bee, Chia Kim Chwee, Ng Wah Hing, Rajah Zahar
- 1937: Emma Sadka/Emily Sadka, Lim Chong Eu, Chin Kim Hong, Ismail bin Md. Ali (K. Lumpur)
- 1938: Lim Kok Ann, Lee Lian Chye, Yap Pow Meng, Abu Bakar bin Tamin
- 1939: Oliver Lyons Phipps (Penang), Wilbur Boswell (Singapore), Rodney Russell Lam (Kuala Lumpur)
- 1940: Chung Shiu Tett (S), Dr. C. V. Jumeaux (F), Dr. Megat Khas bin Megar Omar (F), Maurice. E. Baker (C'Hlds S), D. R. E. S. Monteiro (F), Chuah Yew Cheng (F)
- 1941: Dr. Md. bin Mahomed (F), Dr. Wong Koon Yip/Wong Kin Yip/Wong Kim Yip (F)
- 1942: Dr. Irene Rajaratnam née Irene Hoisington (S), Kenneth Byrne (F), Dr. B. H. Sheares (F)
- 1946: Dr. Suleiman bin Md. Attas (F), Chin Fung Kee (S), Abdul Kadir bin Shamsuddin (S), E. W. Barker (S)
- 1947: Dr. A. W. E. Moreira (F), Dr. Arthur A. Sandosham (F), Lim Ewe Hock (S), Kwa Geok Choo (S)
- 1948: Dr. Yahya Cohen (S), Chua Sui Eng (S) Kiang Ai Kim (F), Cheah Bian Kung (S), Dr. Abbas bin Haji Alias (F), Dr. Md. Din bin Ahmad (F)
- 1949: Dr. Thong Saw Pak (Ipoh, S), Dr. Omar bin Din (Alor Star, S), Dr. Jaswant Singh Sodhy (Klang, F)
- 1950: Chua Sui Eng (S), Lim Tay Boh (F), Dr. Abdul Majid bin Haji Ismail (S)
- 1951: Francis Morsingh (Penang S), Aminuddin Baki (S), Gwee Ah Leng (S)
- 1952: Wee Sip Chee/Wee Sit Chee (Singapore S), Un Hon Hin (Singapore S), Eunice Thio (Singapore S), Lim Joo Jock (S)
- 1954: Chan Kong Thoe (Penang)
- 1955: Dr. Mrs. E. Hannam (S), Tan Kheng Choo (S), Hwang Peng Yuan (S)
- 1956: Huang Hsing Hua (Seremban S), Ang Kok Peng (Taiping F), Mah Guan Kong (Singapore S), Colin Leicester (Singapore S)
- 1957: Satwant Singh Dhaliwal (K. Lumpur S), Chatar Singh Data (Ipoh)

== See also ==
- Category:Queen's Scholars (British Malaya and Singapore)
