= Tan Kim Ching =

Singaporean businessman

- 陳金鐘
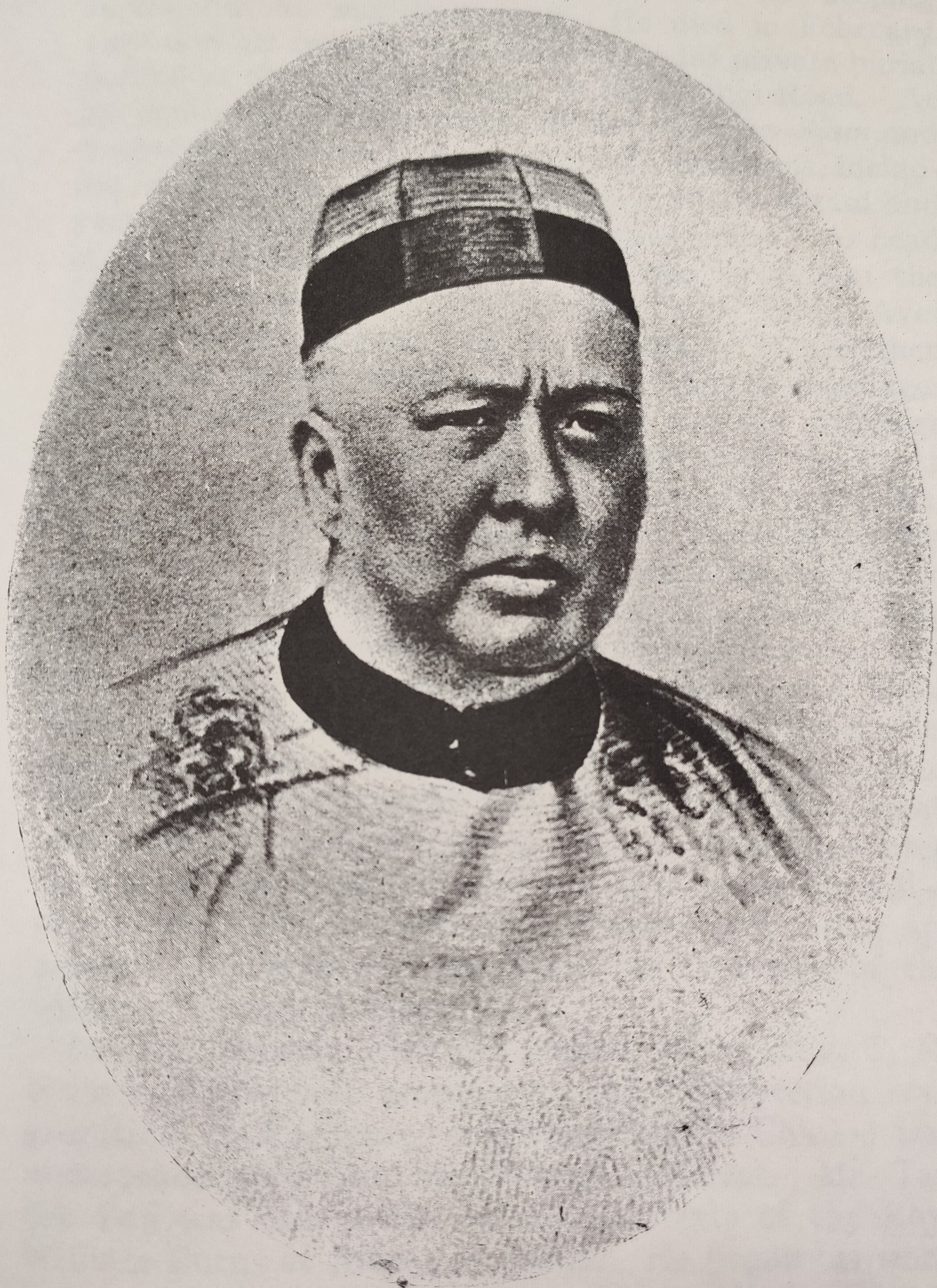
- Tan in One Hundred Years' History of the Chinese in Singapore (1923)

2nd Kapitan Cina of Singapore
- Preceded by: Tan Tock Seng (acting)

Personal details
- Born: 1829 Malacca, Straits Settlements
- Died: 27 February 1892 (aged 62–63) Singapore, Straits Settlements
- Parent(s): Kapitan Tan Tock Seng (father); Lee Seo Neo (mother)

Tan Kim Ching (Chinese: 陳金鐘; Pe̍h-ōe-jī: Tân Kim-cheng; 1829 – 27 February 1892), also known as Tan Kim Cheng, was a Chinese politician and businessman. He was the eldest of the three sons of Tan Tock Seng, the founder and financier of Tan Tock Seng Hospital. He was consul for Japan, Thailand and Russia, and was a member of the Royal Court of Siam. He was one of Singapore's leading Chinese merchants and was one of its richest men in Singapore at that time. He was also the first Asian member of the Straits Branch of the Royal Asiatic Society. After his father's death, he became the Kapitan Cina of the Straits Chinese community. He is believed to have been the head of the Triad in Malaya.

== Business career ==
Tan was one of Singapore's leading Chinese merchants, one of the richest men in Singapore and had sizable business interests in Singapore, Siam, Vietnam and Malaya. His business boomed with rice mills he owned in Bangkok and Saigon.

He helped to manage his father's firm, "Tan Tock Seng", which is named after his father. After his father's death, the firm was renamed as "Tan Kim Ching" after him. The business was carried on at "River-Side" (now known as Boat Quay) from 1851 to 1859 with him as the sole owner. In 1860, Tan admitted his brother Tan Swee Lim as a partner, the firm was renamed as "Tan Kim Ching & Brother". Tan Swee Lim left the firm after a few months. The firm was finally renamed as "Kim Ching & Co.". With considerable success at the firm, Tan subsequently bought rice mills at Saigon, Siam, and elsewhere which supplied him with his milled rice. In 1888, the company opened a branch in Hong Kong.

Tan also had mining concessions and had tin mining operations in the Kra Isthmus, Patani, Mount Ophir, Kampong Rusa, and various other places.

He was also one of the earliest merchants to import silk from China.

In 1863, Tan paid $120,000 to set up the Tanjong Pagar Dock Company and purchased two steamships, Siam and Singapore.

In 1866, Tan, along with William Henry Macleod Read (Chairman of the Straits Chamber of Commerce), secured the lease for Klang from Raja Abdullah bin Raja Jaafar, the administrator of Klang. Among the benefits of this lease arrangement was being able to collect taxes. Their attempts to collect taxes from Raja Mahdi whose father Raja Sulaiman was Klang's headman, however, sparked off a civil war that became known as The Klang War or The Selangor Civil War.

Some historians have said that the history of Kra Buri began with its governor, Tan Kim Ching.

== Diplomacy ==
Tan played a significant role in fostering relationships between Singapore and the colonial government on the one hand, and Siam and its ruler King Mongkut (Rama IV) on the other.

When the Hokkien-Teochew Riots which broke out on 5 May 1854 over 400 people were killed during 10 days of violence. In a meeting with British authorities, Tan represented the Hokkiens and with his assurance and that of Seah Eu Chin of the Teochews, the situation was brought to an end.

Tan helped the new Governor of the Straits Settlements, Harry Ord, secured a new treaty with Kedah in 1867, and played an integral role in ending the Larut wars by getting Raja Muda Abdullah of Perak to seek British intervention, which led to the signing of the Pangkor Treaty of 1874.

In March 1878 The Straits Asiatic Society (formed on 4 November 1877) was renamed The Straits Branch of the Royal Asiatic Society and Tan was one of its founding members.

Tan had a very close relationship with the royal family of Siam and often served as their go-between. In recognising the importance of his role, he was appointed ‘the first Siamese Consul in Singapore’ by King Mongkut in 1863 and in 1885, King Chulalongkorn elevated his title to that of consul-general. He was bestowed the royal title Phraya Astongt Disrarak Siamprajanukulkij. He was also Special Commissioner for Siam in the Straits Settlements.

He introduced his business partner in Singapore, Read, to the Siamese king in the late-1850s when the king desired to get out of a disadvantageous treaty with France.

He had great influence on the Chinese outside the colony, especially in the northern Malay States bordering Siam, Kelantan and Patani (originally all the Malay states were vassals of Siam but British intervention brought them under the control of the British Empire as "independent states". Eventually Patani was reannexed in 1909 as part of the Kingdom of Siam). Exercising this influence, during the time of Sir Andrew Clarke, Tan Kim Ching was instrumental in settling a difficulty that arose between the Siamese and Perak governments.

King Mongkut of Siam (also known as King Rama IV) wanted someone to educate his immediate family without the person attempting to convert them to Christianity while educating them. He turned to Tan for a recommendation. On a suggestion from William Adamson of The Borneo Company, Tan recommended Anna Leonowens, a teacher in Singapore who is looking for work to support herself and her two children.

When the King and Queen of Siam landed in Singapore in 1890 they stayed at Tan's home, "Siam House", in North Bridge Road. It was reported that the king, who was expected to arrive in Singapore at Tanjong Pagar Wharf on board the royal vessel Ubon Burratit on 30 May 1890, had landed at Johnston's Pier instead. Due to the late arrival, only Tan was at the pier to receive him.

When the king wished to acquire property in Singapore, he turned to Tan for recommendations which resulted in the acquisition of "Hurricane House" in the vicinity of Orchard Road.

=== The Larut Wars and Pangkor Treaty ===
Tan was a member of the Ghee Hin secret society and a supporter of the Raja Muda Abdullah of Perak and the Ghee Hin in Larut. It was Tan who had encouraged Abdullah to write seeking the involvement of the British.

Raja Muda Abdullah of Perak, who was arrested at sea and temporary incarcerated on Penang, was forbidden return to Perak and went to Singapore in October 1873 to seek help from the Ghee Hin there. Abdullah met Tan, a member of the Ghee Hin based in Singapore, there. With introduction from the Ghee Hin in Penang, Tan offered to put Abdullah on the throne in return for five elevenths (5/11) of all duties collected between Telok Serah and Krian for a period of ten years. Introducing Abdullah to William Henry Macleod Read, Tan and Read drafted a letter to the Governor of the Straits Settlements, Andrew Clarke, which Abdullah signed, in which Abdullah expressed his desire to place Perak under British protection, and "to have a man of sufficient abilities to show him a good system of government."

According to British naval historian C. Northcote Parkinson in his book British intervention in Malaya 1867-1877, Clarke, just weeks after his arrival in Singapore, had already found evidence of the continuing disturbances in Perak and Selangor. Apart from his executive council, Clarke talked to Tan and decided that both Hai San and Ghee Hin should have access to Larut with neither side being excluded, a complete reversal of the policy of his predecessor, Harry Ord. Tan agreed and wrote to the Ghee Hin on Penang to put this to them and advocate peace.

Tan's letter was sent to Chin Ah Yam, head of the Ghee Hin in Penang, by William A. Pickering who was sent by Clarke. The Ghee Hin headmen considered the letter and agreed to surrender their forces in seven days time.

As a result, Clarke was able to convened a conference aboard the Colonial Steamer Pluto anchored off Pangkor island from 13 to 20 January 1874 and led to the signing of the Pangkor Treaty of 1874.

== Civil career ==
In 1860 the Hokkien Huay Kuan was established in the premises of the Thian Hock Keng at Telok Ayer Street and Tan was installed as its first leader. He held the position of president for 30 years. He was especially noted for his establishment of a marriage registry for the Hokkiens.

In 1864, he was elected to the grand jury as one of five Chinese members on the jury.

In 1865 he was made a Justice of the Peace by the British Straits Settlements government.

== Political career ==
In 1888, Tan was appointed to the municipal council.

== Societies ==
Tan was the leader of the Ghee Hin Kongsi, a secret society in Singapore and Malaya.

Tan and his father Tan Tock Seng, representing most of the Malacca-born Hokkien, led the Haizhang group. During the tenure of Chiu Sin Yong's Revenue Farming syndicate in Singapore, backed by Khoo Thean Poh, Tan testified against Cheang Hong Lim and his group who had mobilized all of their allies and affiliates and organized a conspiracy to scuttle Chiu's farming syndicate.

The division between Hokkien migrants from Quanzhou and Zhangzhou led to a rivalry between Haizhang group and Zhang Hai group, led by Cheang Sam Teo and his son, Cheang Hong Lim.

== Philanthropy ==
=== Tan Tock Seng Hospital ===
On 25 July 1844, the foundation stone of the Tan Tock Seng Hospital was laid on Pearl's Hill. The stone was laid but the construction took three years. After that the hospital stayed empty for another two years because of insufficient funding. In 1852, in order to ease overcrowding at the hospital founded by his father Tan Tock Seng, Tan offered to bear the cost of additions to the building, approximately two thousand dollars ($2,000). His generous gesture led to many other merchants increasing monthly subscriptions to Tan Tock Seng Hospital.

By 1854, the additions were completed. An inscription engraved in stone at the hospital gate acknowledges the donation of $3,000 by Tan Kim Ching. After all of that it was decided that the Tan Tock Seng Hospital had to move as the government wanted to build a new building. Tan agreed to the move, on condition that the rebuilt hospital should not cost less than the original one. He also requested a female ward, which his mother paid for in 1858 to perpetuate the memory of Tan Tock Seng. In 1858, two years after the government's decision to acquire Pearl's Hill, construction work began and Tan Kim Ching donated an additional $3,340.

=== Tan Si Chong Su ===
Tan together with Tan Swee Beng donated funds to build an ancestral temple to serve the needs of the Tan clan (people bearing the Tan surname) and in 1876 the Tan Si Chong Su was built.

=== School funding ===
In 1849, when the Chinese school Chung Wen Ge was built, he donated $100.

In 1854, he donated $150 towards the construction of the Chui Eng School.

== Personal life ==
Towards the end of his life, Tan was prosecuted for keeping slaves but was discharged.

Tan had three wives and a total of 19 children. He had seven children with his first wife, Chua Yee Ren, three children with Khunying, Puen Anukulsiamkit, and nine children in his third marriage.

His eldest daughter, Tan Cheng Gay (Chinese: 陳靜雅; pinyin: Chén Jìngyā), who had been taught Chinese and also a little English, was the first among those appointed trustees of his estate to take out probate of his will, one of the rare instances of a Chinese lady being appointed and assuming the duties of executrix of the will of a Chinese testator.

Five of his grandsons (and who were all sons of Tan Soon Toh), Tan Boo Liat, Tan Cheow Pin (Chinese: 陳昭彬; pinyin: Chén Zhāobīn), Tan Kwee Liang (Chinese: 陳季良; pinyin: Chén Jìliáng), Tan Kwee Swee (Chinese: 陳季隨; pinyin: Chén Jìsuí) and Tan Kwee Wah (Chinese: 陳季騧; pinyin: Chén Jìguā) were well known members of the Chinese community.

== Death ==
Tan died of suspected heart disease on 27 February 1892 and his remains were interred at his private burial ground at the thirteenth mile on the Changi Road. His grave was transferred to Bukit Brown in 1940.

== Honours ==
- Commander of the Third Class of the Order of the Rising Sun of Japan.
- Special letter of thanks from the Governor of the Straits Settlements, Sir Andrew Clarke, for his role in settling a difficulty that arose between the Siamese and Perak governments.
- Special letter and honour from China for his contribution to the Famine Fund in 1890.

== Legacy ==
The setting up of the Tao Nan School, established on 18 November 1906, financed by the Hokkien Huay Kuan (which was led by Tan Kim Ching before he died), was initiated by Tan Boo Liat, the grandson of Tan Kim Ching. Tan Kim Ching's residence at Siam House served as temporary grounds for the school which moved to its own premises in Armenian Street and later Marine Parade (1982).

There are two roads named after him in Singapore: the Tan Kim Cheng Road in Bukit Timah and the Kim Cheng Street in Tiong Bahru.

In 2014, a plaque was installed in Kim Cheng Street which narrate the life of Tan.
