= Singapore Recreation Club =

Singaporean sports club

Coordinates: 1°17′31.74″N 103°51′13.644″E

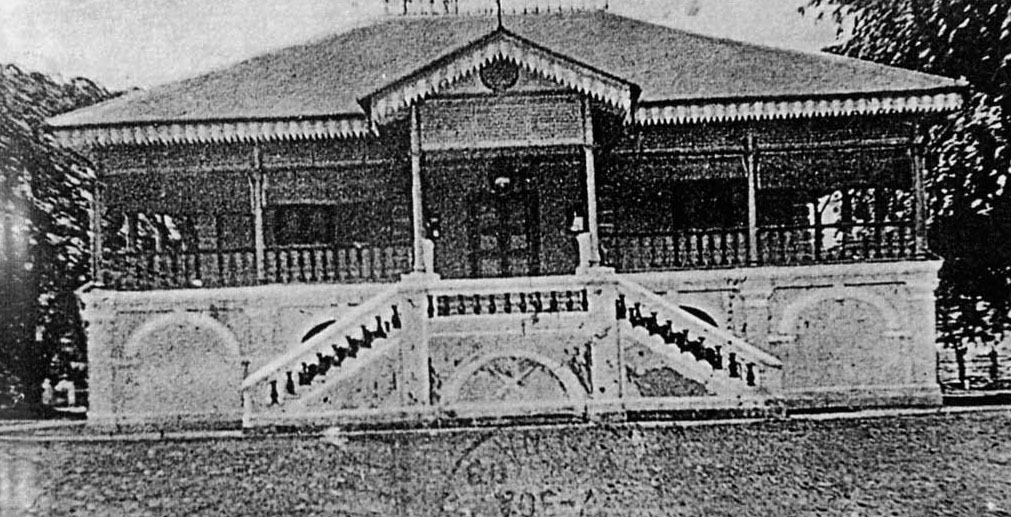
First SRC Clubhouse, 1905

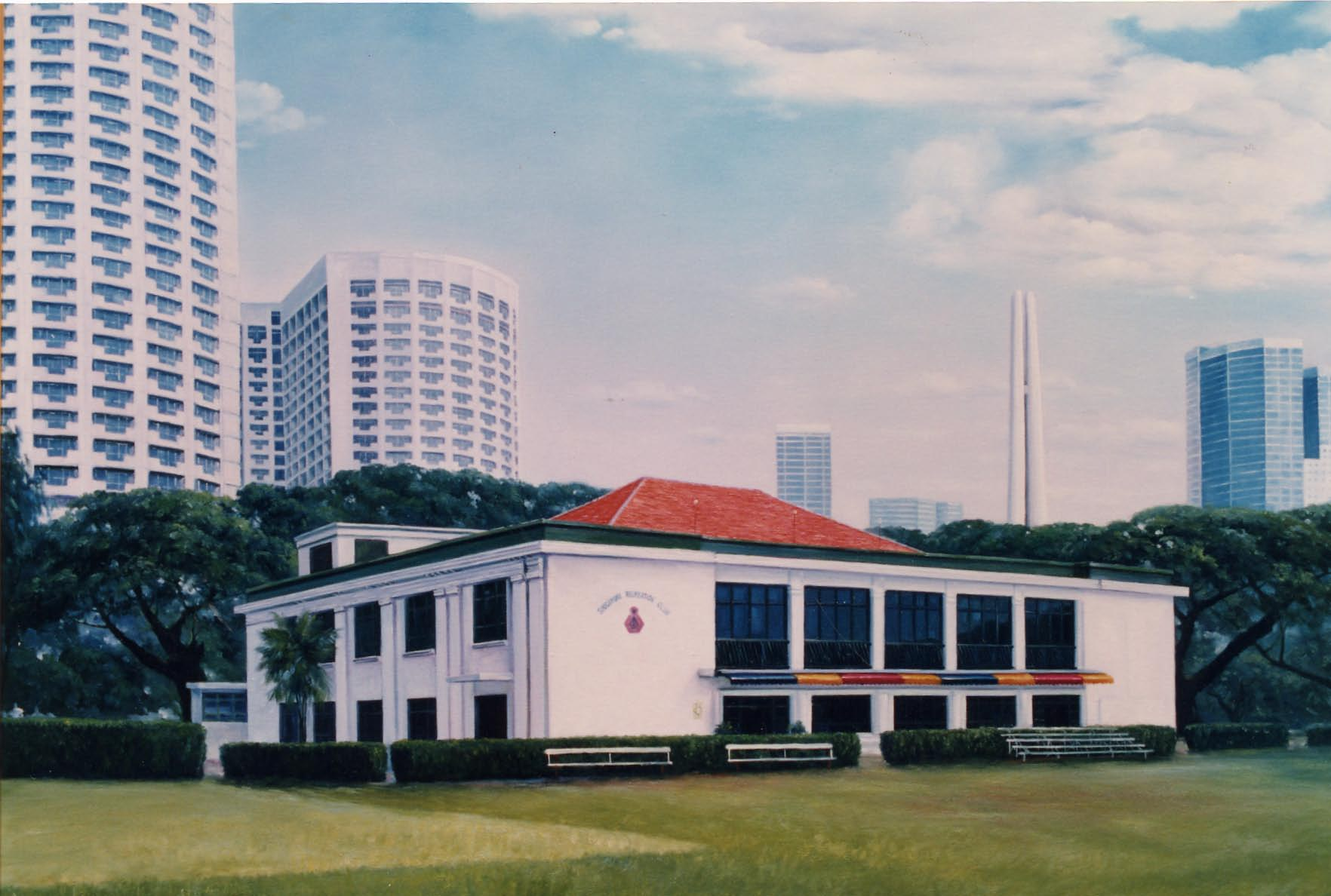
Second SRC Clubhouse, 1983

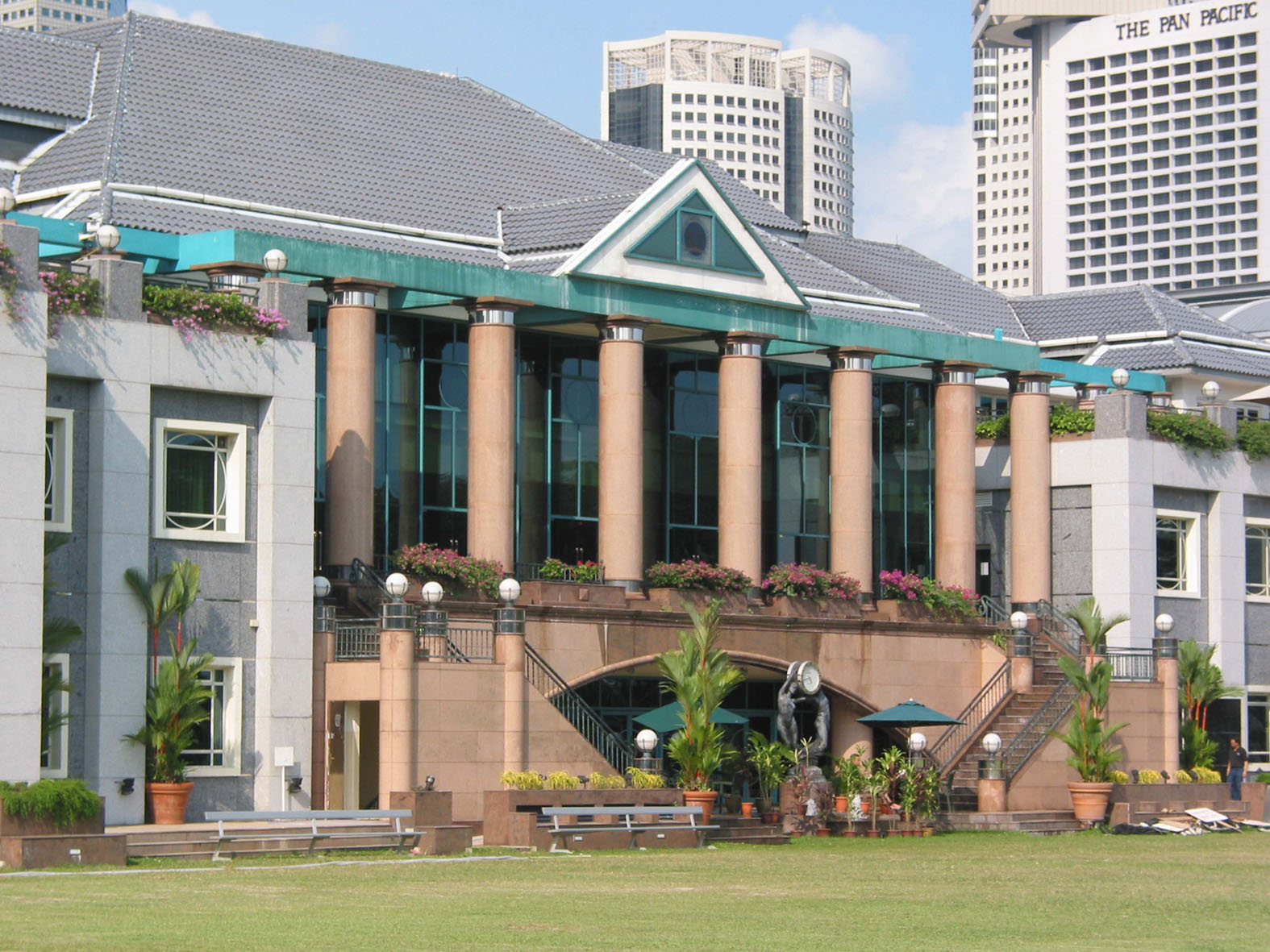
Third SRC Clubhouse, 1997

The Singapore Recreation Club (Abbreviation: SRC; Chinese: 新加坡康乐俱乐部) is one of Singapore's oldest social clubs with a strong sporting tradition, located on Connaught Drive at the north end of the Padang in the heart of Singapore's Civic District.

== History ==
The Singapore Recreation Club was founded on 23 June 1883 by a group of thirty Eurasian men and was officially established on 1 July 1883. At that time, the club was housed in a building on Waterloo Street.

In 1884, a club pavilion was erected on the site of the Padang. Two years later, the club adopted navy blue and red as its corporate colours: navy blue for sportsmanship and red for the brotherhood of man in sports.

By 1904, with increasing membership, the construction of a clubhouse commenced with the foundation stone laid by club president Edwin Tessensohn. The clubhouse was formally opened on 2 September 1905, the governor of Singapore, Sir John Anderson. The addition of two wings was completed in 1931 and declared open by the club president Dr. Noel L. Clarke.

At the Annual General Meeting of 1948, member P. F. de Souza proposed that the club should be open to non-Eurasians. This proposal, though not immediately accepted, gained more support over the years. In 1955, ordinary membership was opened to people of all communities. A year later, in 1956, women were admitted as members for the first time.

At a meeting on 11 February 1963, club president Sir George Oehlers proposed to open full membership to people of all communities in Singapore. This was agreed by a majority of members. As such, the vision that the SRC "will be an inter-racial club in Singapore" was fulfilled.

A new, $65 million clubhouse was opened on 28 June 1997, by Dr. Tony Tan, then Deputy Prime Minister of Singapore and Minister of Defence.

The new clubhouse was the idea of former president Jack Wellington. In 1993, the committee led a fundraising drive to build the new clubhouse; funds were raised through the decision to make membership transferable.

The club stands at the north end of the Padang as part of the historical Civic District, which is also part of the Singapore Grand Prix route.

== Objectives of the Club ==
The objectives of the Club remain: to promote all forms of sports, recreation and social activities through an active calendar of events, as well as to participate in activities of national sports associations and the Singapore National Olympic Council.

== Membership and activities ==
The SRC today has over 5,500 principal members. Sports played by the SRC include billiards and snooker, bowling, cricket, field hockey, golf, soccer, softball and tennis. Social activities and games include balut, bridge, chess, dancesport, line dancing and Toastmasters.
