= Pluto (1839 ship) =

One of six ocean-going iron warships built by the Secret Committee

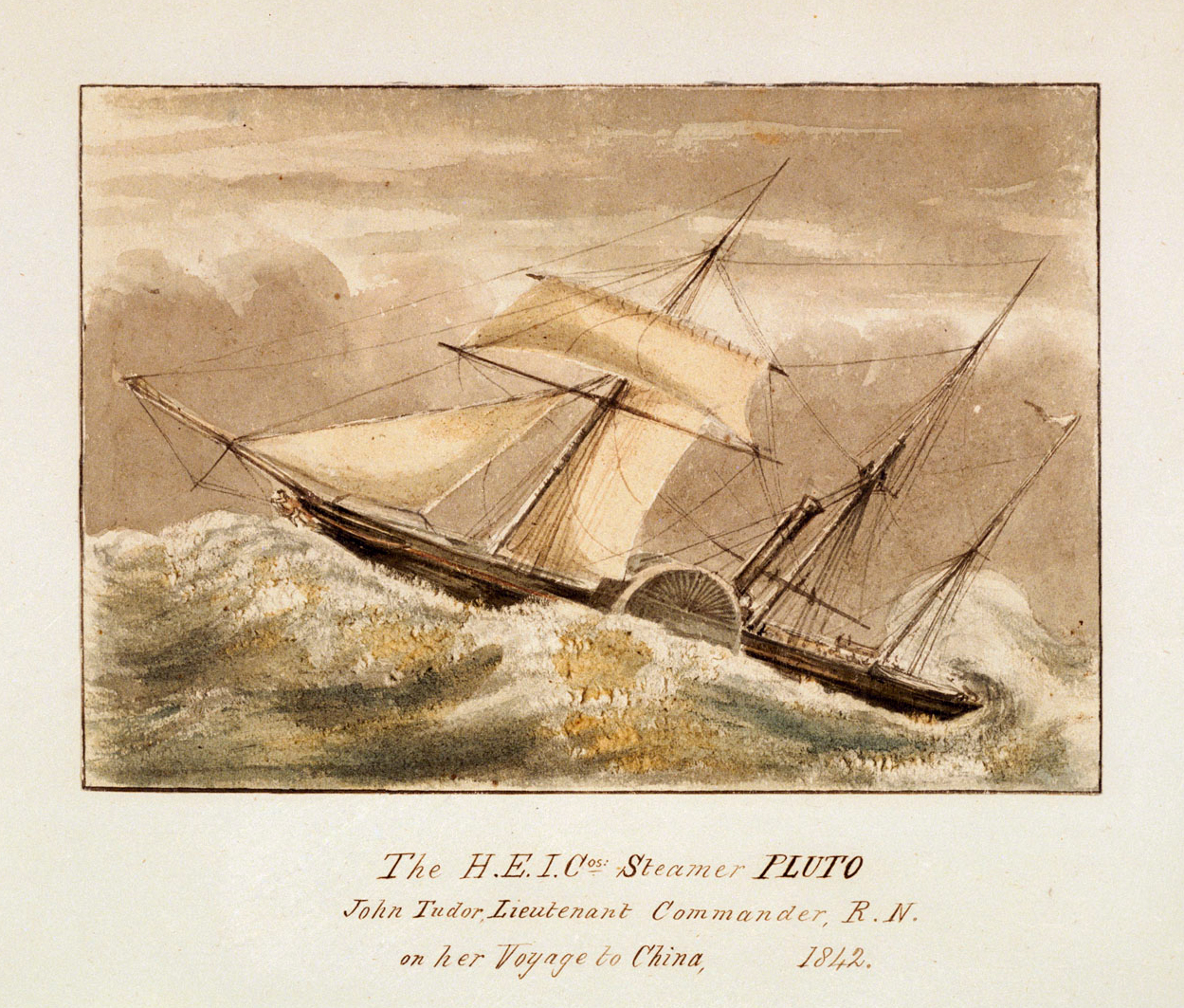
- HEICS Pluto on her voyage to China 1842

History
- Name: HEICS Pluto (1839-1863); HM Straits Steamer Pluto (1863-1868)
- Namesake: Pluto
- Owner: East India Company (1839–1852); Bengal Marine (1852–1863); Government of the Straits Settlements (1863–1868)
- Builder: Fairbairn & Co., Thames
- Launched: September 1839
- Commissioned: 28 October 1841
- Fate: Broken up in 1868 - Hull sold off

General characteristics
- Class & type: Paddle frigate
- Tons burthen: 450 bm
- Propulsion: 100 hp (75 kW) oscillating engines by Maudslay, Sons & Field
- Armament: (1839–1852) - 1 × 32-pounder gun + 2 × 12-pounder carronades; (1852–1863) - 4 x 24-pounder brass carronades + 2 x brass long 6-pounder chaser guns, (1863–1868) - 4 x 24 pounder brass cannons + 2 × 6 pounder chaser guns, supplemented by Congreve rockets
- Notes: Cost £40,315

HEICS Pluto was the first of the six British iron warships ordered by the East India Company 'Secret Committee' to complete its construction in 1839, but due to defects in its construction, the ship did not sail to the East until 28 October 1841. The vessel's sister ships were Nemesis, Phlegethon, Proserpine, Ariadne, and Medusa. Pluto and Proserpine were built by Messrs Fairbairn & Company on the Thames at Millwall, while Nemesis and Phlegethon were built by John Laird's yard at Birkenhead. All four of these ships sailed under their own power to India, while the other two ships the Ariadne and Medusa were shipped in parts.

== China ==
Pluto participated in the later stages of the First Opium War, commanded by Lieutenant Tudor, and was present at the attacks on Woosung and Shanghai, and in the advance up the Yangtze Kiang to Chinkiangfoo. In 1846 she went ashore on the south China coast, and it was thought that she was a total loss, but the vessel was eventually recovered and taken back to Hong Kong.

== Later career ==
After the First Opium War, Pluto operated in China, Borneo, and as a packet in India and was eventually transferred to the Bengal Marine in April 1852. When the Straits Settlements needed to replace the Hooghly Steamship, the crew of that steamer were transferred to Pluto while the ship was under repair at Calcutta and she began her service in the Straits Settlements in March 1863 and from then on was known as the HM Straits Steamer Pluto.

== Fate ==
Pluto was retired from service in 1868 and its hull was sold off for $1,100 at Singapore.
