= Legislative Council of the Straits Settlements =

British colonial legislature (1867–1942)

Type
- Type: Unicameral

History
- Established: 1 June 1867; 159 years ago
- Disbanded: 15 February 1942; 84 years ago
- Succeeded by: Legislative Council of Singapore

The Legislative Council of the Straits Settlements was the first modern legislature in the Straits Settlements, which today forms the Republic of Singapore as well as the Malaysian states of Penang and Malacca. It was formed on 1 April 1867 when the Straits Settlements was made a crown colony. A legislature allowed laws to be made more swiftly and efficiently, as it was directly responsible to the secretary of state for the colonies in London, instead of being placed under a legislative hierarchy and answering to the Calcutta colonial government based in India.

Letters patent granted a colonial constitution on 4 February, which allocated much power to the governor. The governor was assisted by an executive council and legislative council, the latter of which was entrusted with lawmaking in the colony, although the governor had a casting vote and the power of assent and veto on all legislations.

== Organisation ==
The Legislative Council was made of members in the Executive Council, the chief justice and non-official members nominated by the governor. These nominated members were intended to "better represent the local people", including in its ranks Asian members. Consisting mostly of wealthy Asian business and professional leaders, they did not necessarily represent the collective will of the people, however. Beginning with just four members, it grew over the years, with Singaporean members increasingly dominating the council to the displeasure of politicians from Malacca and Penang who viewed the legislature in being more focused on Singapore affairs instead of the Straits Settlements as a whole.

Despite obvious control by British subjects of European descent, there was little opposition towards the system from the local Asian population, mainly attributed to apathy. There were a few exceptions. Tan Cheng Lock, a member of the Executive Council who had previously opposed several decisions made by the Legislative Council (such as the Aliens Ordinance of 1933 which restricted immigration) as anti-Chinese, called for popular representation through direct election, and for the number of non-official members to be increased to a majority of the Legislative Council.

Initiatives like these were unsuccessful, as there was little support from a society widely apathetic to local politics, with the Chinese population paying more attention towards growing their commercial and professional interests and in events which were occurring in Qing China and the later Republic, fuelled largely by the rise in Chinese nationalist sentiments.

== Dissolution ==
After World War II, the Straits Settlements (Repeal) Act, 1946 dissolved the Straits Settlements, with Singapore becoming a crown colony in its own right, while Penang and Malacca became part of the Malayan Union. With Singapore left on its own, the council became the legislature of its colonial government and was renamed the Legislative Council of Singapore.

== Successor legislatures ==
- Federal Legislative Council → Parliament of Malaysia
  - Malacca State Legislative Assembly
  - Penang State Legislative Assembly
- Legislative Council of Singapore → Legislative Assembly of Singapore → Parliament of Singapore
