= Tan Tock Seng =

Singaporean merchant and philanthropist

- 陳篤生
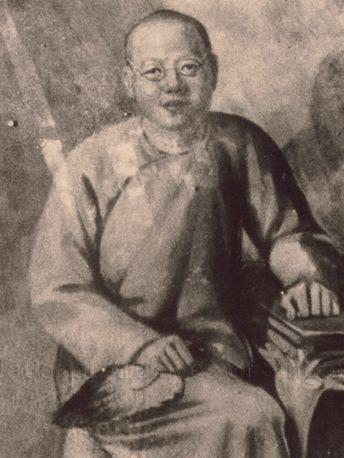
- Tan c. 1840

Personal details
- Born: 1798 Dutch Malacca
- Died: 24 February 1850 (aged 51–52) Singapore, Straits Settlements
- Cause of death: Illness
- Resting place: Outram Hill, Singapore
- Spouse: Lee Seo Neo (李淑娘)
- Children: 5
- Parent(s): Tan Guat Teong (father); Kow Geok Neo (mother)
- Known for: Tan Tock Seng Hospital

Tan Tock Seng (Chinese: 陳篤生; pinyin: Chén Dǔshēng; Pe̍h-ōe-jī: Tân Tok-seng; 1798 – 24 February 1850) was a Malacca-born merchant and philanthropist from Singapore.

== Early life and business ==
Tan Tock Seng was born in Malacca in 1798 to a Chinese Fujianese immigrant father and local Peranakan mother. He left for Singapore in 1819 at the age of 21, shortly after Stamford Raffles established a trading port on the island under the British East India Company. Tan made a living by selling vegetables, fruits, fish and other produce in the newly-built city center and eventually earned enough to open a store at Boat Quay in 1827. The store was situated at the mouth of the Singapore River.

He then invested in the J. H. Whitehead of Shaw, Whitehead & Company and engaged in property speculation, becoming wealthy in the process and acquiring large tracts of prime land. Tan owned 50 acres (200,000 m²) near the Tanjong Pagar railway station, disjointed land parcels from the Padang leading up to High Street and Tank Road, several Ellenborough Building shophouses.

== Philanthropist ==
Tan then became an influential Chinese leader and was the first Asian to be appointed justice of the peace by Governor William John Butterworth. He was also granted the title of Kapitan Cina (Captain of the Chinese) for settling feuds and assisting new Chinese immigrants upon their arrival to Singapore. The founding of Thian Hock Keng temple was led by Tan for the Hokkien community and still exists at Telok Ayer Street today.

His most famous donation was a $5,000 contribution to the construction of the Chinese Pauper Hospital in 1844, which was named after its benefactor on its opening and referred to colloquially as "Tan Tock Seng hospital". They hospital later relocated to the corner of Serangoon Road and Balestier Road in 1860, and a Female wing was funded by Tan's widow Lee Seo Neo in 1867.

== Death and legacy ==
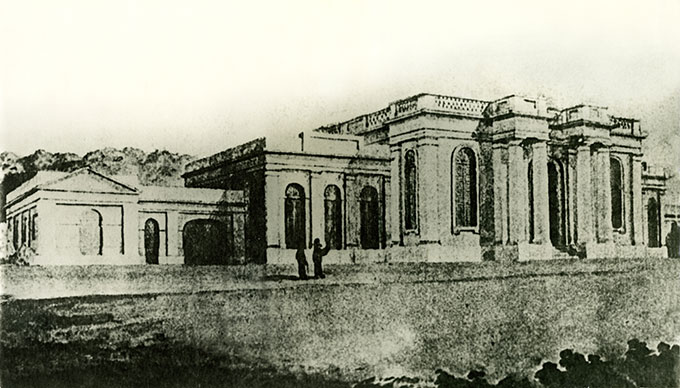
Original hospital between 1844 and 1850

Tan died on 24 February 1850 at the age of 52 after falling ill, leaving behind his wife, three sons and three daughters. His initial burial location is unknown but his remains were re-interred at Outram Hill around 1882. The modern day Tan Tock Seng Hospital and the adjacent road Jalan Tan Tock Seng still bears his name.
