= India–Singapore relations =

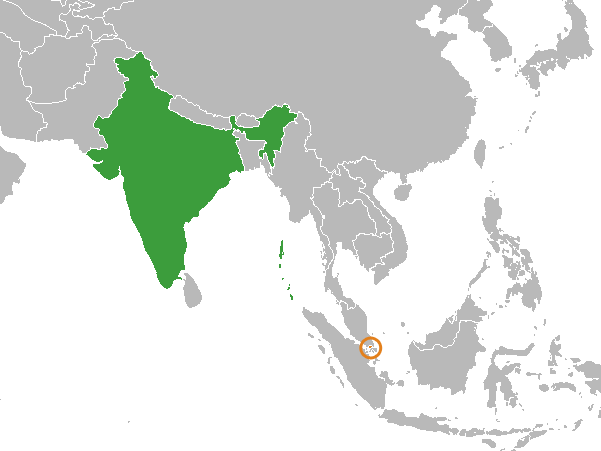
- India: Singapore

Diplomatic mission
- High Commission of India, Singapore: High Commission of Singapore, New Delhi

Envoy
- Indian High Commissioner to Singapore Periasamy Kumaran: Singaporean High Commissioner to India Simon Wong Wie Kuen

Bilateral relations between the Republic of India and the Republic of Singapore have traditionally been strong and friendly, with the two nations enjoying extensive cultural and commercial relations. India and Singapore have signed the Comprehensive Economic Cooperation Agreement (CECA) and strategic-relationship agreement in order to increase trade, investments and economic cooperation, and expanded bilateral cooperation on maritime security, training forces, joint naval exercises, developing military technology and fighting terrorism.

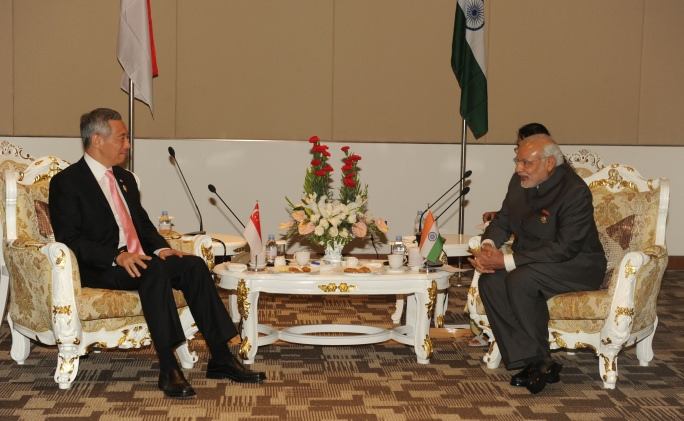
Singapore's Former Prime Minister Lee Hsien Loong with the Indian Prime Minister Narendra Modi.

== Background ==
India and Singapore share long-standing cultural, commercial and strategic relations, with Singapore being a part of the "Greater India" cultural and commercial region and receiving its name from the Sanskrit singa-puram (lion-city). From 1826 to 1867, Singapore, as part of the Straits Settlements, was administered as a unit of British India; the port city had a unique importance in helping the British Empire secure the eastern entry to the Indian Ocean.

More than 500,000 people of Indian origin live in Singapore. Following its independence in 1965, Singapore was concerned with China-backed communist threats as well as domination from Malaysia and Indonesia and sought a close strategic relationship with India, which it saw as a counterbalance to Chinese influence and a partner in achieving regional security. Singapore had always been an important strategic trading post, giving India trade access to the Far East. Although the rival positions of both nations over the Vietnam War and the Cold War caused consternation between India and Singapore, their relationship expanded significantly in the 1990s; Singapore was one of the first to respond to India's "Look East" Policy of expanding its economic, cultural and strategic ties in Southeast Asia to strengthen its standing as a regional power.

== Development of bilateral relations ==
Diplomatic relations between India and Singapore were established on 24 August 1965, fifteen days after the latter became independent. Ever since Singapore's independence, both nations have maintained high-level contacts. Between 1966 and 1971 the Prime Minister of Singapore Lee Kuan Yew visited India three times (1966, 1970 and 1971). The then-Indian Prime Minister Indira Gandhi visited Singapore in 1968, as did Indian leader Morarji Desai. Singapore supported India's bid to become a permanent member of the U.N. Security Council and expand its role and influence in the Association of Southeast Asian Nations (ASEAN). Singapore also supported India in its war against Pakistan in 1965 and the Kashmir conflict.

Military relations between the two nations had been limited due to foreign policy differences in the Cold War era, as Singapore was allied with NATO, whilst India established itself as a founding member of the Non-Aligned Movement, and as the only South Asian country to recognise the Democratic Republic of Afghanistan.

In 2003, India and Singapore signed a bilateral agreement on expanding military cooperation, conducting joint military training, developing military technology and achieving maritime security. The Singaporean Navy and the Indian Navy have conducted joint naval exercises and training since 1993 such as SIMBEX and MILAN near India's Andaman and Nicobar Islands. India and Singapore have also expanded their cooperation in fighting terrorism.

Over the last two decades, Singapore has positioned itself as the hub of India's economic, political and strategic relationships in Southeast Asia. When India announced its Look East policy in 1992, Singapore positioned itself as India's de facto regional sponsor. As Indian Defence Minister Pranab Mukherjee commented in 2006, Singapore has become “the hub of its political, economic and security strategy in the whole of East Asia.”

According to a 2010 Gallup poll, 40% of Singaporeans approve of India's leadership, with 23% disapproving and 37% uncertain.

After the death of Lee Kuan Yew in 2015, India followed with a weekend of national mourning in memory of the founding father of Singapore, and Prime Minister Narendra Modi visited Singapore in November 2015 reaffirming fifty years of bilateral relations.

== Commerce ==
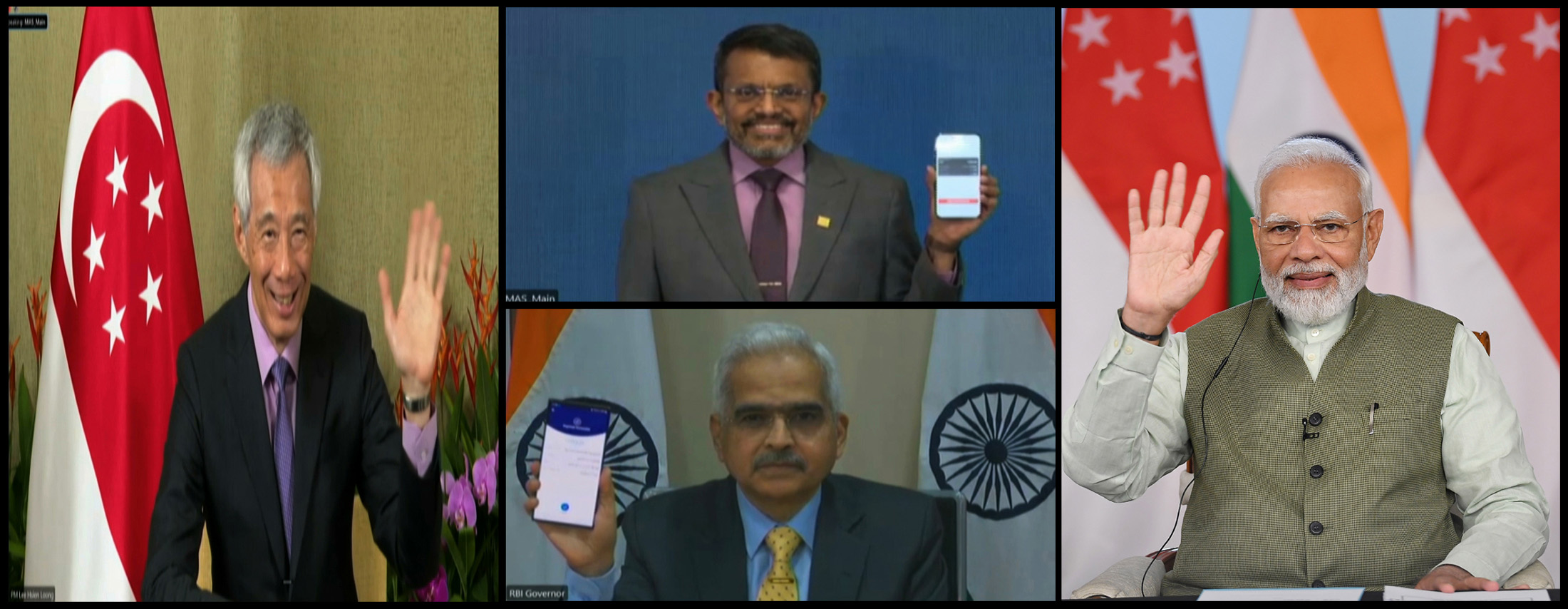
Singapore's Prime Minister Lee Hsien Loong with the Indian Prime Minister Narendra Modi during the Virtual Launch of UPI-PayNow Linkage.

Singapore is the 8th largest source of investment in India and the largest amongst ASEAN member nations. It is also India's 9th biggest trading partner as of 2005–06. Its cumulative investment in India totals US$3 billion as of 2006 and is expected to rise to $5 billion by 2010 and $10 billion by 2015. India's economic liberalisation and its "Look East" policy have led to a major expansion in bilateral trade, which grew from US$2.2 billion in 2001 to $9 billion – 10 billion in 2006 – a 400% growth in the span of five years – and to $50 billion by 2010. Singapore accounts for 38% of India's trade with ASEAN member nations and 3.4% of its total foreign trade. India's main exports to Singapore in 2005 included petroleum, gemstones, jewellery, machinery and its imports from Singapore included electronic goods, organic chemicals and metals. More than half of Singapore's exports to India are "re-exports" – items that had been imported from India.

In 2005, both nations signed the Comprehensive Economic Cooperation Agreement (CECA) and have organised the India-Singapore Parliamentary Forum and the Singapore-India Partnership foundation with active support from the Federation of Indian Chambers of Commerce and Industry (FICC), the Confederation of Indian Industry (CII) and the Singapore Business Federation to promote trade, economic development and partnerships. The CECA eliminated tariff barriers, double taxation, duplicate processes and regulations and provided unhindered access and collaboration between the financial institutions of Singapore and India. The CECA also enhanced bilateral collaboration related to education, science and technology, intellectual property, aviation and relaxed visa regulations for Indian professionals in information technology, medicine, engineering and financial fields to emigrate and work in Singapore. Singapore has invested in projects to upgrade India's ports, airports and developing information technology parks and a Special Economic Zone (SEZ). India has become Singapore's 4th biggest tourist destination and more than 650,000 Indians visited Singapore in 2006. Both nations have worked to collaborate on aviation, aerospace engineering, space programmes, information technology, biotechnology and energy.

Singapore and India successfully concluded the second review of the India-Singapore Comprehensive Economic Cooperation Agreement (CECA) on 1 June 2018 in the presence of India Prime Minister Narendra Modi and Singapore Prime Minister Lee Hsien Loong.

In September 2018, India and Singapore formally launched the third review of CECA which focuses on trade facilitation, e-commerce and customs.

CECA is one of the most controversial FTAs Singapore has signed since its independence, particularly in relation to the immigration dimension of the FTA. Many Singaporeans argue that it only marginally boosts Singapore's already high GDP for its size, at the expense of being "one-sided" and "non-beneficial" towards Singaporeans in general. Many have noted statistics such as the proportion of EP holders from India increasing from about one seventh in 2005 to about a quarter in 2020 and the number of Indian Nationals being more than 10% of the overall population., as an associated effect of the CECA deal. While the Singapore government has publicly stated that these figures are "misleading" and claimed that "all foreign nationals applying for Employment Passes must meet our prevailing criteria" Local Singaporeans have noted lived experiences contradictory to the governments statements, ranging from biased hiring practices to immigration to Singapore which lacks proper checks and balances. Regardless, this issue remains a hotbed in Singapore politics.

India's ISRO have launched various satellites built by Singaporean universities and organisations. 20 satellites have been launched over the course of 13 years.

== Military cooperation ==
In 1994, India and Singapore began their annual naval combat exercise, now called "SIMBEX" Several warships from India and Singapore took part in this interoperable combat exercise.

In 2003, India and Singapore signed a Defence Cooperation Agreement, allowing Singapore army and air force to conduct training on Indian soil.

On 24 November 2015, India and Singapore signed the agreement for the "strategic relationship" across the board including defence and military, security and intelligence cooperation, political exchanges, enhancing trade and investment, improving financial linkages, improving air connectivity and cooperation in multilateral forums.

On 29 November 2017, the two countries signed a naval cooperation agreement aimed at boosting maritime security, joint exercises and mutual logistics support. The agreement also permits ships of either navy to refuel, restock and, rearm at each other military bases. After signing the agreement, Singapore's Defence Minister Dr. Ng Eng Hen stated, "not only would we be more comfortable, we would encourage the Indian Navy to visit Changi Naval base more often".

The Republic of Singapore Air Force (RSAF) and the Indian Air Force (IAF) regularly conduct joint military training exercises.

India and Singapore also signed the revised Defence Cooperation Agreement to strengthen the existing defence relationship between Indian military and Singapore Armed Forces on 29 November 2017.

== Impact of COVID-19 ==
When the COVID-19 pandemic in Singapore was declared in 2019, India and Singapore unilaterally stopped issuing short-term tourist visas from 11 March and 24 March 2020 onwards respectively. Before Singapore stopped releasing individual case details in April 2020, more than 1,600 Indian nationals were diagnosed with COVID-19. In May 2020, India embarked on a repatriation scheme which would have brought back 1,250 Indian nationals from Singapore, while assisted Singapore in repatriating approximately 400 Singaporeans from India. Despite the pandemic, investment flows between the two countries had 'slowed down a little bit' with approximately US$2 billion worth of investments going into India.

As India experienced its second wave of infections beginning March 2021, India faced an oxygen shortage nationwide to treat COVID-19 patients. Four cryogenic oxygen tanks donated by Tata Group, which were being used for transporting oxygen across the nation, were airlifted by the Indian Air Force from Singapore. The Republic of Singapore Air Force also sent two planeloads of oxygen supplies, and Temasek Holdings, one of the two Singaporean government investment companies, donated medical supplies such as ventilators and oxygen concentrators. Various ground-up initiatives had started as well in Singapore to raise funds and gather supplies for those affected in India.

In May, Delhi Chief Minister Arvind Kejriwal claimed without evidence that a new COVID-19 variant from Singapore was extremely dangerous for children and could result in a third wave in India. Singapore's ministry of health had to clarify there was no Singapore variant nor any evidence of a Covid-19 variant extremely dangerous for kids. It became apparent that the increase in COVID cases came from the SARS-CoV-2 Delta variant originating in India.

== See also ==
- Indians in Singapore
- Singaporeans in India
