= Malaysian diaspora =

Ethnic group

Overseas Malaysians
Diaspora Malaysia (Malay)
- Map of the Malaysian Diaspora in the world

Total population
- 2,486,673
- Singapore: 1,615,300
- Australia: 281,940
- Indonesia: 146,200
- United Kingdom: 90,163
- United States: 73,812
- Brunei: 48,100
- China: 26,248
- Canada: 25,340
- Taiwan: 24,323
- New Zealand: 23,000
- Saudi Arabia: 19,000
- Hong Kong: 14,000
- South Korea: 13,810
- India: 12,109
- Japan: 11,471
- Germany: 10,846
- Libya: 9,000
- Netherlands: 6,376
- Qatar: 5,000
- Ireland: 4,595
- United Arab Emirates: 4,500
- France: 3,000
- Switzerland: 3,000
- Egypt: 3,000
- Brazil: 2,950
- Sweden: 2,000
- Sri Lanka: 1,750
- Italy: 1,000
- Argentina: 1,000
- Spain: 1,000
- Belgium: 1,000
- Denmark: 1,000
- Thailand: 1,000
- South Africa: 1,000
- Algeria: 1,000
- Norway: 800
- Philippines: 800
- Finland: 800
- Bahrain: 500
- Kuwait: 380
- Russia: 40
- Iceland: 20

Languages
- Malay, Languages of Malaysia and various languages of the countries they inhabit

Religion
- Religion in Malaysia

The Malaysian diaspora consists of Malaysian citizens who emigrated from Malaysia, or individuals with ancestral connections to its predecessor states, the Federation of Malaya, the Malayan Union or British Malaya, along with their descendants residing in foreign countries. The population is estimated at approximately 1.86 to 2.49 million, comprising both the descendants of early migrants and more recent emigrants from modern-day Malaysia. The largest of these overseas communities are located in Singapore, Australia, Brunei, and the United Kingdom.

Emigration from Malaysia is a complex demographic phenomenon existing for decades and having a number of reasons, with institutional racism being one of the major factors. The process is the reverse of the immigration to Malaysia. Malaysia does not keep track of emigration, and counts of Malaysians abroad are thus only available courtesy of statistics kept by the destination countries. As of 2025, according to the United Nations Department of Economic and Social Affairs, the population of the Malaysian diaspora stands at 2,486,673.

== Reasons of emigration ==
- Economic reasons
- Education opportunities (e.g. study abroad)
- Family reasons (most common with recent immigrants or permanent residents)
- Marriage to a foreigner with a job in the foreign country
- Lack of meritocracy
- Business opportunities
- Religious reasons
- Disenchantment and disillusionment with the political system
- Access to health insurance, and other health reasons (see Universal health care)
- Racism, particularly against non-Bumiputera/Malay citizens
- Evasion of legal liabilities (e.g. crimes, taxes, loans, etc.)
- LGBTQ migration, discrimination against LGBTQ Malaysians have seen an increase of them seeking refuge overseas in more accepting and tolerant countries.

=== Brain drain ===
Due to the concept of Ketuanan Melayu (lit. 'Malay supremacy'), a citizen that is not considered to be of Bumiputera status face many roadblocks and discrimination in matters such as economic freedom, education, healthcare and housing. Opposition groups, government critics and human rights observers has labeled the Malaysian situation as being highly similar to apartheid policies due to their status as de facto second-class citizens. Such policies has also led to a significant brain drain from the country.

== Citizenship ==
Malaysians can acquire their citizenship in several ways. Anyone born to at least one Malaysian parent on Malaysian soil is considered to be a Malaysian citizen at birth. For people born outside Malaysia, they will automatically become Malaysian citizens if they were born to a Malaysian father and their births were registered with Malaysian diplomatic missions within one year. However, a 2024 constitutional amendment has made it eligible for both overseas Malaysian fathers and mothers to pass down their Malaysian citizenship to their overseas-born child, but this amendment has yet to officially come into force.

Malaysian citizens may lose their citizenship in two ways, either by voluntary renunciation, or deprivation by the Malaysian government if they were found to have voluntarily acquired foreign citizenship, voted in a foreign election, or acquired a foreign passport (but not including marriage).

A person who has acquired his Malaysian citizenship by naturalization may also be deprived of his citizenship if he:

1. is residing in a foreign country and has, for a period of five years, failed to register annually with Malaysian diplomatic missions of his intention to keep his Malaysian citizenship; or
2. has committed disloyalty or treasonous acts against Malaysia.

== Electoral rights ==
Malaysians residing overseas who have not registered as a Normal Elector before or who wish to be registered as an Absent Voter to participate in any Malaysian election may register with the respective consulate generals, embassies or high commissioners. As of 2013, only 8,756 Malaysians (1%) out of over 700,000 Malaysians living abroad have registered as postal voters. 6,092 of the 8,756 registered citizens overseas or 69.82% had cast their votes at 100 Malaysian missions worldwide for the Malaysian general election, 2013.

== Population by continent ==
The list below is of the countries with significant Malaysian populations. Those shown first with exact counts are enumerations of Malaysians who have immigrated to those countries and are legally resident there, does not include those who were born there to one or two Malaysian parents, does not necessarily include those born in Malaysia to parents temporarily in Malaysia and moved with parents by right of citizenship rather than immigration, and does not necessarily include temporary expatriates.

Population of the Malaysia diaspora in 2019
Continent / Country	Articles	Overseas Malaysian Population
Africa		13,726
Libya		8,404
Asia		1,278,839
Singapore	Malaysians in Singapore	952,261
Brunei		52,001
China		26,248
Taiwan		22,000
Hong Kong		19,787
India	Malaysians in India	12,228
Japan		10,561
Indonesia		2,363
Thailand		1,369
Philippines		817
Other Asian Countries		5,782
Oceania		191,784
Australia	Malaysian Australian	174,136
New Zealand	Malaysian New Zealander	17,464
Europe		142,348
United Kingdom	Malaysians in the United Kingdom	84,638
Other European Countries		28,855
Americas		103,455
United States	Malaysian American	77,647
Canada	Malaysian Canadian	25,337
Other America Countries		527

Many Malaysians have relatives in Brunei, similar to Singapore, especially amongst ethnic Malays of Bruneian Malay origin residing in southern Sabah, Federal Territory of Labuan as well as northern Sarawak. There are approximately 9% Malaysian diaspora in Brunei, mostly expatriates working in the petroleum industry (Brunei Shell Petroleum oil company). Malaysians in India consist of expatriates and international students from Malaysia as well as Indian people of Malaysian descent and most of them are ethnic Malaysians of Indian origin, working as well as studying in the home country of their ancestors. In 2011, an estimated 2,500 Malaysians, mostly working for Malaysian-based companies as well as 2,000 students, reside in India, mainly in South India.

The overseas Malaysian diaspora in Singapore is one of the largest with the number standing at 952,261 in 2019, making them the world's largest Malaysian diaspora community. Many Malaysians in Singapore are usually expatriates, working in various industries of the Singapore economy since its rapid industrialisation in the 1970s. In 2010, according to the World Bank, there are 385,979 Singapore residents of Malaysian origin, including permanent residents and Singaporeans.

At the 2016 Census 138,364 Australian residents stated that they were born in Malaysia. As of 2006 census, there is around 14,547 Malaysian-born people lived in New Zealand.

The Malaysian community in the UK is one of the west's largest, this is mainly due to the influence of the British Empire on Malaysia. The 2001 UK Census recorded 49,886 Malaysian-born people, with September 2009 Office for National Statistics estimates putting the figure at around 63,000.

According to answers provided to an open-ended question included in the 2010 United States Census, 26,179 people said that their ancestry or ethnic origin was Malaysian. The Canada 2006 Census recorded 12 165 people self-identifying as Malaysian Canadian, but only 1 820 of these self-identified as exclusively Malaysian Canadian.
