= Singaporean diaspora =

Total population
- 221,600 (2025)

Regions with significant populations
- Diaspora total: 340,751 (2019) (Note: This number is fluid and includes Singaporean citizens and people of Singaporean descent who renounced their citizenship, statistics of overseas Singaporeans retaining their citizenship stands at 221,600 as of 2025.)
- Malaysia: 91,002
- Australia: 64,739
- United Kingdom: 58,432
- United States: 39,018
- Indonesia: 23,524
- China: 12,799
- Canada: 12,582
- Hong Kong: 10,000
- Bangladesh: 9,709
- South Korea: 7,476
- New Zealand: 5,734
- India: 4,155
- Netherlands: 4,126
- Japan: 2,735
- Germany: 2,638
- France: 2,512
- Switzerland: 2,349
- United Arab Emirates: 2,000
- Brunei: 2,000
- Taiwan: 1,863
- Vietnam: 1,830
- Brazil: 1,115
- Norway: 1,000
- Sweden: 1,000
- Denmark: 1,000
- Finland: 1,000
- Italy: 1,000
- Spain: 1,000
- Belgium: 1,000
- Malta: 1,000
- Mexico: 1,000
- Thailand: 1,000
- South Africa: 1,000
- Libya: 1,000
- Mali: 1,000
- Philippines: 691
- Sri Lanka: 612
- Qatar: 400
- Russia: 10

Languages
- English; Malay; Mandarin; Tamil

Religion
- Buddhism; Christianity; Islam; Taoism; Hinduism

Related ethnic groups
- Singaporeans

The Singaporean diaspora refers to citizens or people who identify as a nation with the sovereign island city-state of Singapore that are living outside the borders of Singapore. Most Singaporeans overseas are high-income expatriates bringing their expertise or skills to other countries while accompanied by their families or students temporarily studying abroad.

According to the United Nations Department of Economic and Social Affairs in 2019, the population of the Singaporean diaspora stands at 340,751 and according to official statistics from the Government of Singapore in 2025, 221,600 of Singaporeans overseas continues to retain their citizenship. Most of the Singaporean diaspora are generally located in Malaysia, Australia, the United Kingdom, the United States, Indonesia and China.

== Overview ==
Most Singaporeans abroad are high-income expatriates accompanied by their families, as Singaporean professionals are sought after in various industries in regions such as China, India, the Middle East, Malaysia, Vietnam and Indonesia, for their bilingual proficiency and high-income skills. Other Singaporeans living abroad includes students seeking to study in overseas universities or individuals that settled in the home countries of their foreign spouses.

The population of the Singaporean diaspora was at 156,468 in 1990, with the United Kingdom having the largest community of Singaporeans at 33,320 and the second largest in Malaysia, with a population of 31,269. In 2000, the population of the diaspora increased to 192,989, which was a 23.3% increase since 1990. In the same year, the number of Singaporeans in Malaysia increased to 44,779 individuals, surpassing the community in the United Kingdom, which had a population of 39,131. From 2000 to 2015, the number of Singaporeans moving abroad increased to 314,281 individuals. By 2019, there were 340,751 overseas Singaporeans, with 123,551 individuals holding other nationalities.

Most Singaporeans living abroad rarely renounce their citizenship and continues to keep strong ties to the country; there were only an average of 1,000 Singaporeans renouncing their citizenship annually. Furthermore, Singaporean students living abroad increasingly have plans to return to Singapore after completing their studies in countries such as Australia, New Zealand, the United Kingdom and the United States.

According to a 2016 survey conducted by the Institute of Policy Studies, 69.7% of Singaporeans aged between 19 and 30 stated that they could achieve the goals they have without migrating and 62.6% "preferred to improve" their socioeconomic well-being without migrating.

=== Factors ===
According to a 2014 survey conducted by Singapore Polytechnic, some of the top reasons why Singaporeans would go abroad were to "increase their spending, find more opportunities overseas for work and education, or have a slower pace of life". Other factors include having different lifestyles, such as having access to more outdoor natural recreational activities in other countries (e.g. backpacking, camping, hiking and skiing).

== Notable people ==
This is a list of notable people of Singaporean origin that includes people who were born or raised in Singapore and Singaporeans living abroad.

=== Politics ===
- Ian Goodenough – Australian politician
- Michael Chan, Baron Chan – British physician and politician
- Peter Whish-Wilson – Australian politician
- Wan Azizah Wan Ismail – Malaysian politician and Former Deputy Prime Minister of Malaysia
- Francis Seow – Singaporean politician and lawyer
- Devan Nair – Former President of Singapore
- Yaw Shin Leong – Singaporean politician

=== Business ===
- Desney Tan – Singaporean researcher working for Microsoft Research, based in the United States
- Victoria Chan-Palay – Singaporean neuroscientist, former American citizen
- Nancy Lam – Singaporean chef based in the United Kingdom
- Patrick Grove – Australian entrepreneur, co-founder of Catcha Group
- John Burton-Race – British Michelin starred chef
- Quek Leng Chan – Malaysian tycoon, co-founder of Hong Leong Group Malaysia
- Brandon Wade – American businessman, of Singaporean descent

=== Arts, Entertainment, and Sports ===
- Boey Kim Cheng – Australian poet
- Paddy Boom – American professional drummer
- Ross Butler – Singaporean-born American actor
- Sashi Cheliah- Singaporean Australian Chef & Masterchef winner
- Chin Han – Singaporean Hollywood actor
- Anna Cummer – Canadian actress
- Amanda Lee Koe – Singaporean-American novelist
- Kevin Kwan – American novelist
- Kygo – Singaporean-born Norwegian DJ
- Julia Nickson – Singaporean-born American actor
- Allan Massie – Scottish journalist, columnist, sports writer and novelist
- Vanessa-Mae – British violinist
- Wilfred Skinner – Singaporean national athlete, migrated to Canada
- Tan Kheng Hua – Singaporean Hollywood actress, producer and beauty queen
- Louis Theroux – British-American filmmaker
- Astra Sharma – Australian tennis player
- Sharon Tay – American journalist and former host
- Gwendoline Yeo – Singaporean Hollywood actress
- Einstein Kristiansen - Singaporean Norwegian comedian & comical artist
- Mohamad Nasir bin Mohamed - Singapore-born Malaysian singer-songwriter, composer, producer, actor, film director, and painter
