= Singaporean Americans =

Americans of Singaporean birth or descent

Total population
- 12,435 (2023)

Regions with significant populations
- Chicago; New York City; Seattle; Los Angeles; San Francisco; Houston; Honolulu

Languages
- American English; Singapore English; Malay; Mandarin; Tamil and Spanish

Religion
- Buddhism; Christianity; Islam; Taoism; Hinduism

Related ethnic groups
- Asian Americans; Singaporeans; Overseas Singaporean

Singaporean Americans refers to Americans with Singaporean heritage or ancestry. Since the Singaporean government does not permit multiple- citizenships, it is not lawful for a person to hold both the Singaporean and American citizenships. Therefore, "Singaporean Americans" generally does not indicate that the person holds both the Singaporean and American citizenships. Additionally, because Singapore is a multi-racial and multi-ethnic country, the term "Singaporean" describes citizenship, not an ethnic group.

There is a small community of Singaporeans in the United States, consisting largely of expatriate professionals from Singapore and their families as well as international students. The bulk of Singaporeans in the United States reside in metropolitan areas along a coastline, with the highest population located within the corridor connecting Boston, New York, and Washington, D.C. On the West Coast, most Singaporean Americans live within several hundred miles of Los Angeles and the San Francisco Bay Area. The next highest concentrations are in Texas, followed by an enclave by the Great Lakes, near Chicago and Ann Arbor.

== Top 10 U.S. metropolitan areas with large Singaporean Americans population ==
Rank	MSA	Region	Singaporean-Americans (descent)
1	New York-Northern New Jersey-Long Island	Mid-Atlantic	533
2	Los Angeles-Long Beach-Santa Ana	Pacific	505
3	San Francisco Bay Area	Pacific	368
4	Houston-Sugar Land-Baytown	West South Central	269
5	San Jose–Sunnyvale–Santa Clara	Pacific	255
6	Boston-Cambridge-Quincy	New England	185
6	Dallas-Fort Worth-Arlington	West South Central	185
8	Seattle-Tacoma-Bellevue	Pacific	173
9	Washington-Arlington-Alexandria	South Atlantic	165
10	Chicago-Joliet-Naperville	East North Central	136

== Notable people ==
- Ng Chin Han – Hollywood actor
- Pragathi Guruprasad - Playback singer
- Megan Skiendiel – Singer, dancer, and actress
- Neeraj Khemlani – Co-president of CBS News and CBS Television Stations
- Shin Lim – Magician
- Boon Thau Loo – Academic administrator, University of Pennsylvania
- Corrinne May – Musician, singer, and songwriter
- Julia Nickson-Soul – Actress
- Lewis Tan - Actor and martial artist, actor-stuntman father Philip is of Singaporean Chinese-British descent
- Sharon Tay – Journalist
- Michael Yani – Tennis player
- Gwendoline Yeo – Actress, musician, and writer
- Daniel Chong – Animator, writer, director, producer, and the creator of Cartoon Network's We Bare Bears
- Minfong Ho - Children's and young adult novelist
- Po-Shen Loh - Mathematician
- Rosalie Chiang - Voice actress from Turning Red

== See also ==
- Singapore–United States relations
- Asian Americans
