= India–Malaysia relations =

- India: Malaysia

Diplomatic mission
- High Commission of India, Kuala Lumpur: High Commission of Malaysia, New Delhi

Envoy
- Indian Ambassador to Malaysia Shri Mridul Kumar: Malaysian High Commissioner to India Hidayat Abdul Hamid

India–Malaysia relations, also called Indo-Malaysian relations, are the bilateral foreign relations between India and Malaysia. India has a high commission in Kuala Lumpur, and Malaysia has a high commission in New Delhi and consulate generals in Chennai and Mumbai. Both countries are full members of the Commonwealth of Nations, Asia Cooperation Dialogue and G15. India and Malaysia are also connected by various cultural and historical ties that date back to antiquity. The two countries are on very friendly terms with each other, seeing as Malaysia is home to a strong concentration of Indian immigrants. Mahathir Mohamad, the fourth and longest-serving prime minister of Malaysia has Indian ancestry. On trade front, their bilateral trade volume stands at $10.5 billion and is poised to reach $20.01 billion in 2023-24.

== History ==
=== Modern history ===
Official diplomatic relations between both modern states was established in 1957, following the Federation of Malaya independence. Since then, both countries leaders has made several visits to each others.

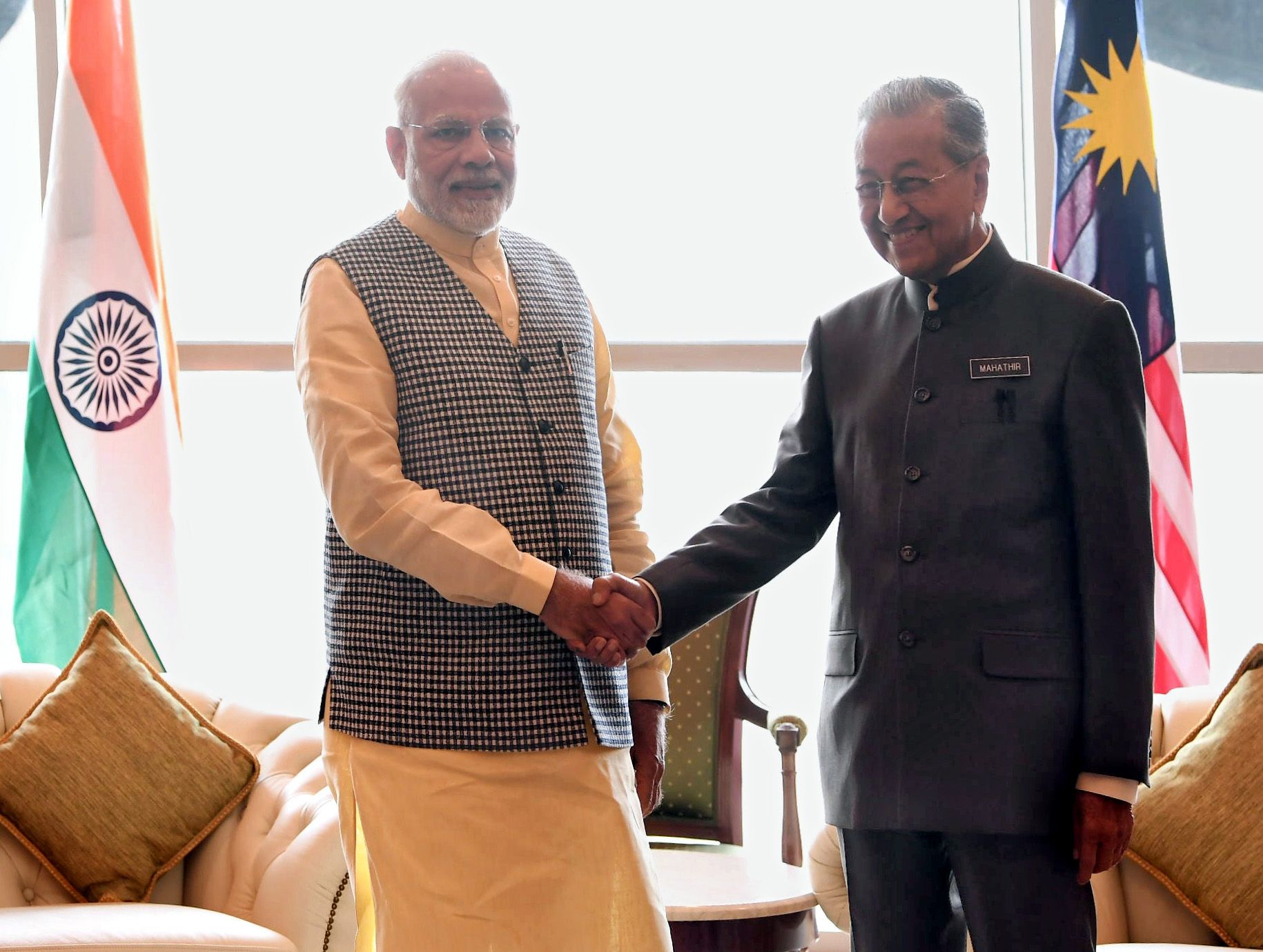
Prime Minister of India Narendra Modi and Prime Minister of Malaysia Mahathir Mohamad in Kuala Lumpur, 31 May 2018

In 2020, following comments from Malaysian Prime Minister Mahathir Mohamad speaking in opposition to the revocation of Kashmir's special status and the passing of the Citizenship Amendment Act, India imposed restrictions on Malaysian palm oil imports. But the ousting of Mahathir Mohamad from the Malaysian Prime Minister's seat in late March had blown for a fresh reconciliation of ties when Muhyiddin Yassin who had climbed to power in the face of huge domestic and regional scrutiny for conducting a bypass of election rights of citizens, had signed a record deal with India to import 100,000 tones of rice. In response to this, The Indian government lifted any sort of trade bans placed on the imports of Malaysian palm oil, thus subsequently increasing the import volume to an all-time high average of 500,000 tones per month.

In August 2024, India and Malaysia elevated their bilateral relationship to a Comprehensive Strategic Partnership during Malaysian Prime Minister Anwar Ibrahim's visit to India, marking his first visit to the country since taking office in November 2022. The two nations signed multiple memorandums of understanding covering digital technology, worker welfare, and financial services. India also expressed support for Malaysia's bid to join BRICS, and agreed to a one-time export of 200,000 metric tons of non-basmati rice to Malaysia despite India's export ban.

== Economic relations ==
From 2000 to 2013, Malaysia is the 19th largest investor in India with cumulative FDI inflows valued at US$618.37 million. More than US$6 billion Malaysian investments also come in the form of telecommunications, healthcare, banking and construction projects. Trade between the two countries has increased from just US$0.6 billion in 1992 to US$13.32 billion in 2012. Beside that, Indian industrial, IT and healthcare companies also investing in Malaysia along with around 150,000 Indians (including 10,000 Indian expatriates) skilled and semi-skilled workers been employed in the country in the sectors of IT, manufacturing and banking. Malaysian companies as well participating in many infrastructure projects across different Indian states.

In 2017, India and Malaysia signed a new business deal amounting to U$36 billion with the exchange of 31 business memorandum of understanding (MoUs), the largest in the history of economic relations between the two countries. There is also a Malaysia India Business Council.

== Education relations ==
Between the 1960s and 1970s, around 30,000 Malaysian students have studied in Indian educational institutions, mostly in the medical field, with over 30% of the doctors in Malaysia today having been educated in India. The Indian government also provides scholarship to Malaysian students. Due to many Malaysian medical students' need to pursue their education in India, the Manipal Global Education Group agreed to set up their campuses in Malaysia.

== Security relations ==
Since before the formation of Malaysia, many of the country security forces members are trained in India. To counter the growing Chinese influence, India has expressed interest in increasing military and security co-operation with Malaysia.

== See also ==
- Raja Malaya Simha
- Malaysian Indians
- Malaysians in India
- Foreign relations of India
- Foreign relations of Malaysia
