= Malaysians in India =

Community in India

Total population
- 12,109

Regions with significant populations
- Tamil Nadu · Kerala · Andhra Pradesh · Delhi · Karnataka · Punjab

Languages
- Tamil • English • Malay • Mandarin • Other Indian Languages

Religion
- Hinduism · Islam · Roman Catholicism · Protestantism · Buddhism · Taoism

Related ethnic groups
- Singaporeans in India · Malaysian Indian

Malaysians in India consists of expatriates and international students from Malaysia as well as Indian citizens who are of Malaysian descent. Most of them are Malaysians of Indian origin. As of 2015, an estimated 12,442 Malaysians, mostly working for Malaysian-based companies as well as students, reside in India, mainly in South India.

== Distribution ==
=== Karnataka ===
There are several hundred Malaysians in Karnataka, most of them are students in Bangalore, Mangalore, Manipal and Hassan medical and engineering colleges. There are around 400 Malaysians registered in Bangalore. Most of them came there to study medicine. While most of them are students, there are also some business families in the city as well.

=== Tamil Nadu ===
There are several Malaysian families and students residing in Chennai. A number of Malaysians work in the private sectors such as AZRB Construction, TDM Infrastructure, BMW, Nokia, and Hyundai. There are also Malaysian students studying in colleges such as the Saveetha Dental College, Ragas Dental College, Meenakshi Ammal Dental College, Sri Ramacanchra Medical College, St Joseph College and Loyola College.

== Notable people ==
- Malaysia Vasudevan - Tamil playback singer and actor
- Prashanthini - Tamil playback singer
- Ravichandran - Tamil film actor
- Syed Thajudeen - Artist
- Yugendran - Film actor and singer

== See also ==
- India–Malaysia relations
- Sri Lankan Malays
- Consulate General of Malaysia, Chennai
- Malaysian Indian
- Singaporeans in India
