= India–Singapore Comprehensive Economic Cooperation Agreement =

Free trade agreement

The Comprehensive Economic Cooperation Agreement (CECA) is a free trade agreement between Singapore and India to strengthen bilateral trade. It was signed on 29 June 2005.

After the signing, the India-Singapore Parliamentary Forum and the Singapore-India Partnership foundation with active support from the Federation of Indian Chambers of Commerce and Industry (FICC), the Confederation of Indian Industry (CII) and the Singapore Business Federation (SBF) was organised to promote trade, economic development and partnerships. The CECA eliminated tariff barriers, double taxation, duplicate processes and regulations and provided unhindered access and collaboration between the financial institutions of Singapore and India.

The CECA also enhanced bilateral collaboration related to education, science and technology, intellectual property, aviation, information technology, and financial fields. Singapore has invested in projects to upgrade India's ports, airports and developing information technology parks and a Special Economic Zone (SEZ). India has become Singapore's 4th biggest tourist destination and more than 650,000 Indians visited Singapore in 2006. Both nations have worked to collaborate on aviation, aerospace engineering, space programmes, information technology, biotechnology and energy.

== CECA Review ==
Singapore and India successfully concluded the second review of the India–Singapore Comprehensive Economic Cooperation Agreement (CECA) on 1 June 2018 in the presence of India Prime Minister Narendra Modi and Singapore Prime Minister Lee Hsien Loong. It allows for the movement of four types of business people between Singapore and India. The second review of CECA was concluded with no change to the chapter on movement of people.

In response to claims that surfaced in early 2016 that Singapore had backtracked on its commitment on CECA by blocking Indian IT professionals seeking work visas, and that India had put on hold further liberation of trade in response, a spokesman from India's Commerce Ministry confirmed that India had not put the CECA on hold and it continued (to be) in force. Singapore also said it had not received any official notification from the Indian government that the review of the CECA had been put on hold.

In September 2018, India and Singapore formally launched the third review of CECA which focuses on trade facilitation, e-commerce and customs.

All of the Free Trade Agreements Singapore has signed are available at Enterprise Singapore's website.

== Reactions ==
The CECA is one of the most controversial FTAs Singapore has ever signed since its independence as compared with other countries. Opposition parties and supporters argue that it only marginally boosts Singapore's already high GDP for its size while at the expense of being "one-sided" and "non-beneficial" towards Singaporeans in general. Others also added that it has become a point of grievance for locals who believe that a "high influx of Indian professionals has stolen their jobs" and is "crowding out the local society".

=== Political responses ===
In 2020, the Ministry of Trade and Industry (MTI) released a statement identifying that Singaporeans are "understandably concerned" with competition from foreign professionals, managers and executives (PMEs) due to the current bleak economy and employment situation. However, it added that it was also "misleading" to assert that the number of Indian PMEs, especially intra-corporate transferees, as being solely or largely to CECA. MTI also refuted that "None of our free trade agreements, including CECA, obliges us to automatically grant Employment Passes (EP) to any foreign national." Additionally, "All foreign nationals applying for Employment Passes must meet our prevailing criteria, and all companies must comply with rules on fair hiring".

The topic of FTAs and CECA was debated during the 2020 Singaporean general elections between both the governing People's Action Party (PAP) and various opposition parties, most notably the Progress Singapore Party (PSP). Tan Cheng Bock, a former PAP MP and founder of the PSP, promised to call for the review of CECA if elected, especially on one of the terms which allows the free movement of Indian workers in at least 127 sectors to enter and work in Singapore.

In 2020, Leong Mun Wai, as a Non-constituency Member of Parliament (NCMP) of the PSP, spoke in Parliament, mentioning as to how "deeply disappointed" he was that DBS Bank, a Singaporean multinational bank, did not have a "home-grown" Singaporean-born chief executive as the bank's CEO. Piyush Gupta was an Indian national when appointed, becoming a Singaporean citizen shortly thereafter, possibly making him a beneficiary of CECA. Leong was subsequently rebutted by Minister for Communications and Information S. Iswaran and Transport Minister Ong Ye Kung on the merits of his speech which was deemed to be racist.

== See also ==
- India–Singapore relations
