= Space collaborations between Singapore and ISRO =

Space related collaborations between Singapore and Indian Space Research Organisation

ISRO has frequently collaborated with various organisations and universities in Singapore, with activities related to space. With 20 Singaporean satellites launched by ISRO, Singapore is the third largest customer of ISRO'S foreign satellite launching missions. During the India-Singapore technology summit of 2022, both countries signed a memorandum of understanding on cooperation in the fields of science, technology, and innovation.

== History ==
The ISRO launched Singapore's first indigenously built micro-satellite in 2011. Two more satellites were launched in 2014 and 6sixin 2015. During Indian PM Narendra Modi's visit to Singapore in June 2018, six MoUs were signed by NTU for a research and exchange partnership with NITI Aayog.

On 23 February 2022, India and Singapore signed a MoU related to cooperation in the fields of technology, science, and innovation at the India-Singapore Technology Summit 2022's inaugural session. This virtual summit was co-organised by Singapore's Ministry of Trade and Industry (MTI) and India's Department of Science and Technology (DST) and CII.

PSLV C-29 and PSLV-C56 were exclusively commercial launches of Singaporean satellites.

== List of Singaporean satellites launched by India ==
No.	Satellite	Launch date	Launch mass	Launch vehicle	Remarks	Ref
1	X-SAT	20 April 2011	106 kg	PSLV-C16	ISRO launched 3 satellites, of which 1 was foreign.	
2	VELOX 1	30 June 2011	7 kg	PSLV-C23	cubesat	
3	TeLEOS-1	16 December 2015	400 kg	PSLV-C29	Exclusive commercial launch of 6 Singaporean satellites.	
4	VELOX-C1	16 December 2015	123 kg	PSLV-C29	Exclusive commercial launch of 6 Singaporean satellites.	
5	VELOX-II	16 December 2015	13 kg	PSLV-C29	Exclusive commercial launch of 6 Singaporean satellites.	
6	Athenoxat-1	16 December 2015	<5 kg	PSLV-C29	Exclusive commercial launch of 6 Singaporean satellites.	
7	Kent Ridge 1 (KR 1)	16 December 2015	78 kg	PSLV-C29	Exclusive commercial launch of 6 Singaporean satellites.	
8	Galassia	16 December 2015	3.4 kg	PSLV-C29	Exclusive commercial launch of 6 Singaporean satellites.	
9	DS-EO	30 June 2022, 12:32 UTC	365 kg	PSLV-CA C53		
10	NeuSAR	30 June 2022, 12:32 UTC	155 kg	PSLV-CA C53		
11	SCOOB-I	30 June 2022, 12:32 UTC	2.80 kg	PSLV-CA C53		
12	TeLEOS-2	22 April 2023, 08:50 UTC	741 kg	PSLV-CA C55	57th mission of PSLV	
13	Lumelite-4	22 April 2023, 08:50 UTC	16 kg	PSLV-CA C55	57th mission of PSLV	
14	DS-SAR	30 July 2023, 01:01 UTC	352 kg	PSLV-CA C56	58th PSLV mission Commercial launch of Singapore's DS-SAR satellite and 6 co-passenger satellites from Singapore.	
15	Arcade	30 July 2023, 01:01 UTC	24 kg	PSLV-CA C56	58th PSLV mission Commercial launch of Singapore's DS-SAR satellite and 6 co-passenger satellites from Singapore.	
16	Velox-AM	30 July 2023, 01:01 UTC	23 kg	PSLV-CA C56	58th PSLV mission Commercial launch of Singapore's DS-SAR satellite and 6 co-passenger satellites from Singapore.	
17	SCOOB-II	30 July 2023, 01:01 UTC	4 kg	PSLV-CA C56	58th PSLV mission Commercial launch of Singapore's DS-SAR satellite and 6 co-passenger satellites from Singapore.	
18	ORB-12 STRIDER	30 July 2023, 01:01 UTC	13 kg	PSLV-CA C56	58th PSLV mission Commercial launch of Singapore's DS-SAR satellite and 6 co-passenger satellites from Singapore.	
19	Galassia-2	30 July 2023, 01:01 UTC	3.5 kg	PSLV-CA C56	58th PSLV mission Commercial launch of Singapore's DS-SAR satellite and 6 co-passenger satellites from Singapore.	
20	NuLIon	30 July 2023, 01:01 UTC	3 kg	PSLV-CA C56	58th PSLV mission Commercial launch of Singapore's DS-SAR satellite and 6 co-passenger satellites from Singapore.	
