= List of high commissioners of Malaysia to India =

List of Malaysian diplomats to India

Muzafar Shah Mustafa

Malaysia Ambassador to India
- Incumbent
- Assumed office 24 October 2023
- Prime Minister: Anwar Ibrahim
- Preceded by: Hidayat Abdul Hamid

The high commissioner of Malaysia to the Republic of India is the head of Malaysia's diplomatic mission to India. The position has the rank and status of an ambassador extraordinary and plenipotentiary and is based in the High Commission of Malaysia, New Delhi. This ambassador also functioned as non-resident ambassador to Afghanistan and Bhutan.

== List of heads of mission ==
High Commissioner	Term start	Term end	Additional accreditation
S. Chelvasingam MacIntyre	29 September 1957	19 September 1964	
Zaiton Ibrahim	12 October 1964	5 September 1967	
Raja Aznam Raja Ahmad	4 March 1968	20 July 1971	
Abdul Rahman Abdul Jalal	20 December 1971	9 March 1974	
Abdul Khalid Awang Osman	18 March 1974	28 January 1978	
Jamaluddin Abu Bakar	17 February 1978	30 September 1978	
Mon Jamaluddin	7 November 1978	6 March 1982	
Razali Ismail	23 May 1982	20 May 1985	
Mohamed Haron	17 August 1985	7 July 1988	
Mohamed Amir Jaafar	3 August 1988	30 November 1992	
Wan Hussain Mustafa	7 January 1993	8 September 1996	
Marzuki Mohammad Noor	23 October 1996	21 July 1999	
Choo Siew Koh	24 September 1999	19 December 2003	
Zulkifly Ab. Rahman	14 July 2004	31 December 2006	Afghanistan
Tan Seng Sung	15 January 2008	15 April 2013	Afghanistan; Bhutan
Naimun Ashakli Mohammad	6 November 2013	24 November 2016	Afghanistan; Bhutan
Hidayat Abdul Hamid	29 March 2017	4 August 2022	Afghanistan; Bhutan
Muzafar Shah Mustafa	24 October 2023	Incumbent	Afghanistan; Bhutan

== See also ==
- India–Malaysia relations
