= Singaporeans in Malaysia =

Singaporean people living in Malaysia

Total population
- 91,002

Regions with significant populations
- Iskandar Malaysia, Klang Valley, Malacca, Kuching, Penang

Languages
- English, Mandarin Chinese, Malay and Tamil

Religion
- Buddhism, Islam, Hinduism and Christianity

Related ethnic groups
- Singaporeans, Overseas Singaporean

Singaporeans in Malaysia refers to Singaporean citizens and people of Singaporean origin residing in Malaysia. According to estimates published by the United Nations Department of Economic and Social Affairs, 91,002 Singaporeans were living in Malaysia in 2019, making it the largest overseas Singaporean community worldwide.

The community is concentrated primarily in Johor, the Klang Valley, Penang and other major urban centres. Singaporeans in Malaysia include expatriate professionals, business owners, students, retirees and cross-border commuters. The close geographical proximity and extensive economic ties between Singapore and Malaysia have contributed to sustained population movements between the two countries.

== History ==
Population movements between Singapore and Malaysia have continued since Singapore's separation from Malaysia in 1965. Owing to historical, cultural and family ties, migration between the two countries remains relatively common compared with many other international migration corridors.

In the late 20th and early 21st centuries, increasing economic integration between Singapore and southern Peninsular Malaysia encouraged more Singaporeans to reside in Malaysia while maintaining business, employment or family links with Singapore. Improved transport infrastructure, including the Johor–Singapore Causeway and the Malaysia–Singapore Second Link, facilitated cross-border mobility.

== Demographics ==
Singaporeans in Malaysia are concentrated primarily in urban and suburban areas. Johor, particularly Johor Bahru and the wider Iskandar Malaysia region, hosts one of the largest Singaporean populations due to its proximity to Singapore.

Other significant communities are found in the Klang Valley, including Kuala Lumpur and Petaling Jaya, as well as in Penang, Malacca and Kuching. Many Singaporeans residing in these locations are employed in multinational corporations, financial services, education and technology sectors.

== Cross-border commuting ==
A number of Singaporean citizens reside in Johor while commuting regularly to Singapore for employment or education. The substantially lower cost of housing and certain consumer goods in Malaysia has made such arrangements attractive for some households.

Cross-border commuting became more challenging during the COVID-19 pandemic, when border restrictions significantly reduced movement between Singapore and Malaysia. The reopening of the land border in 2022 restored regular commuting patterns between the two countries.

== Retirement and long-term residence ==
Malaysia has become a popular destination for some Singaporean retirees owing to its lower cost of living and comparatively affordable housing. Many participate in the Malaysia My Second Home (MM2H) programme, which allows eligible foreigners to obtain long-term residence permits.

Johor is particularly popular among retirees because of its proximity to Singapore, enabling participants to maintain social and family connections while benefiting from lower living costs.

== See also ==
- Malaysians in Singapore
- Malaysia–Singapore relations
