= Malaysia–Singapore relations =

Malaysian–Singaporean relations

- Malaysia: Singapore

Diplomatic mission
- High Commission of Malaysia, Singapore: High Commission of Singapore, Kuala Lumpur

Envoy
- Malaysian High Commissioner to Singapore Azfar Mohamad Mustafar: Singapore High Commissioner to Malaysia Vanu Gopala Menon

Malaysia–Singapore relations are the bilateral relations between Malaysia and the Republic of Singapore, after the separation of Singapore from Malaysia in 1965. Singapore has a high commission in Kuala Lumpur and a consulate general in Johor Bahru, while Malaysia has a high commission in Singapore. Both countries are full members of the Commonwealth of Nations and ASEAN.

Overall, relations between Malaysia and Singapore are warm and cordial, due to centuries of shared history, close sociocultural similarities, personal connections between the citizens of the two countries, and strong economic ties. There are occasional flareups due to differing political views; however these are often resolved without lasting hostility.

== Country comparison ==
	Federation of Malaysia	Republic of Singapore
Flag	Malaysia	Singapore
Coat of Arms		
Area	330,803 km^{2} (127,724 mi^{2})	719.1 km^{2} (277.6 mi^{2})
Population	33,360,000	5,607,300
Population Density	92/km^{2} (240/sq mi)	7,797.7/km^{2} (20,196/sq mi)
Time zones	1	1
Capital	Kuala Lumpur; Putrajaya (administrative)	Singapore (City-state)
Largest City	Kuala Lumpur – 1,768,000	Singapore – 5,638,700
Government	Federal parliamentary elective constitutional monarchy	Unitary dominant-party parliamentary constitutional republic
Official languages	Malaysian (Malay)	English, Malay, Chinese (Mandarin), Tamil
Main religions	61.3% Islam, 19.8% Buddhism, 9.2% Christianity, 6.3% Hinduism, 3.4% other	31.1% Buddhism, 18.9% Christianity, 20% non-religious, 15.6% Islam, 5% Hinduism, 8.8% Taoism and 0.6% Others
Ethnic groups	69.1% Malay and Bumiputera (Indigenous), 23% Chinese, 6.9% Indian, 1.0% other	74.3% Chinese, 13.4% Malay, 9.0% Indian, 3.2% other
Established	31 August 1957 (Independence from the British Empire proclaimed for the Federation of Malaya) (Independence Day); 16 September 1963 (Proclamation of Malaysia)	6 February 1819 (Established by the British); 3 December 1959 (Self-government granted from the British Empire); 9 August 1965 (Independence proclaimed for Singapore after separation from Malaysia) (National Day)
Predecessor States	Portuguese Colonial Period (1511–1641); Portuguese Malacca (1511–1641) Dutch Colonial Period (1641–1825); Dutch Malacca (1641–1795; 1818–1825) British Colonial Period (1771–1946); Straits Settlements (1826–1946); Federated Malay States (1895–1946); Unfederated Malay States (1909–1946); Raj of Sarawak (1841–1946); Crown Colony of Labuan (1848–1946); British North Borneo (1881–1946) Japanese Occupation Period (1942–1945); Occupied Malaya (1942–1945); Occupied British Borneo (1942–1945); Si Rat Malai (1943–1945) Interim Military Period (1945–1946); Military Administration of Malaya (1945–1946); Military Administration of Borneo (1945–1946) Self–Government Period (1946–1963); Malayan Union (1946–1948); Federation of Malaya (1948–1963); Crown Colony of North Borneo (1946–1963); Crown Colony of Sarawak (1946–1963) Federation Period (1963–present); Malaysia (1963–present)	British Colonial Period (1819–1946); Modern Singapore (1819–1826); Settlement of Singapore (1826–1942; 1945–1946) Japanese Occupation Period (1942–1945); Syonan-to (1942–1945) Interim Military Period (1945–1946); Military Administration of Singapore (1945–1946) Self–Government Period (1946–1965); Crown Colony of Singapore (1946–1963); State of Singapore (1963–1965) Independent Period (1965–present); Republic of Singapore (1965–present)
First Leader	Tuanku Abdul Rahman (Monarch); Tunku Abdul Rahman (Prime Minister)	Yusof Ishak (President); Lee Kuan Yew (Prime Minister)
Head of State	Monarch: Ibrahim Iskandar	President: Tharman Shanmugaratnam
Head of Government	Prime Minister: Anwar Ibrahim	Prime Minister: Lawrence Wong
Deputy Leader	Deputy Prime Ministers: Ahmad Zahid Hamidi, Fadillah Yusof	Deputy Prime Ministers: Gan Kim Yong
Legislature	Parliament (Bicameral)	Parliament (Unicameral)
Upper House	Senate; President: Awang Bemee Awang Ali Basah	Parliament; Speaker: Seah Kian Peng
Lower House	House of Representatives; Speaker: Johari Abdul	Parliament; Speaker: Seah Kian Peng
Judiciary	Federal Court; Chief Justice: Wan Ahmad Farid Wan Salleh	Supreme Court; Chief Justice: Sundaresh Menon
National anthem	"Negaraku" (My Country)	"Majulah Singapura" (Onward Singapore)
Currency	Malaysian ringgit (RM)	Singapore dollar (S$)
National carrier	Malaysia Airlines	Singapore Airlines
International airport	Kuala Lumpur International Airport	Changi Airport
Public broadcasting	Radio Television Malaysia	Mediacorp
Human Development Index	0.802 (57th) (very high)	0.932 (9th) (very high)
GDP (nominal)	$365,303 billion (33rd)	$362,818 billion (34th)
GDP (nominal) per capita	$11,338 (62nd)	$65,627 (7th)
GDP (PPP) per capita	$32,501 (41st)	$103,717 (2nd)
Foreign exchange reserves	$97,614 billion	$373,167 billion

== Diplomatic relations ==
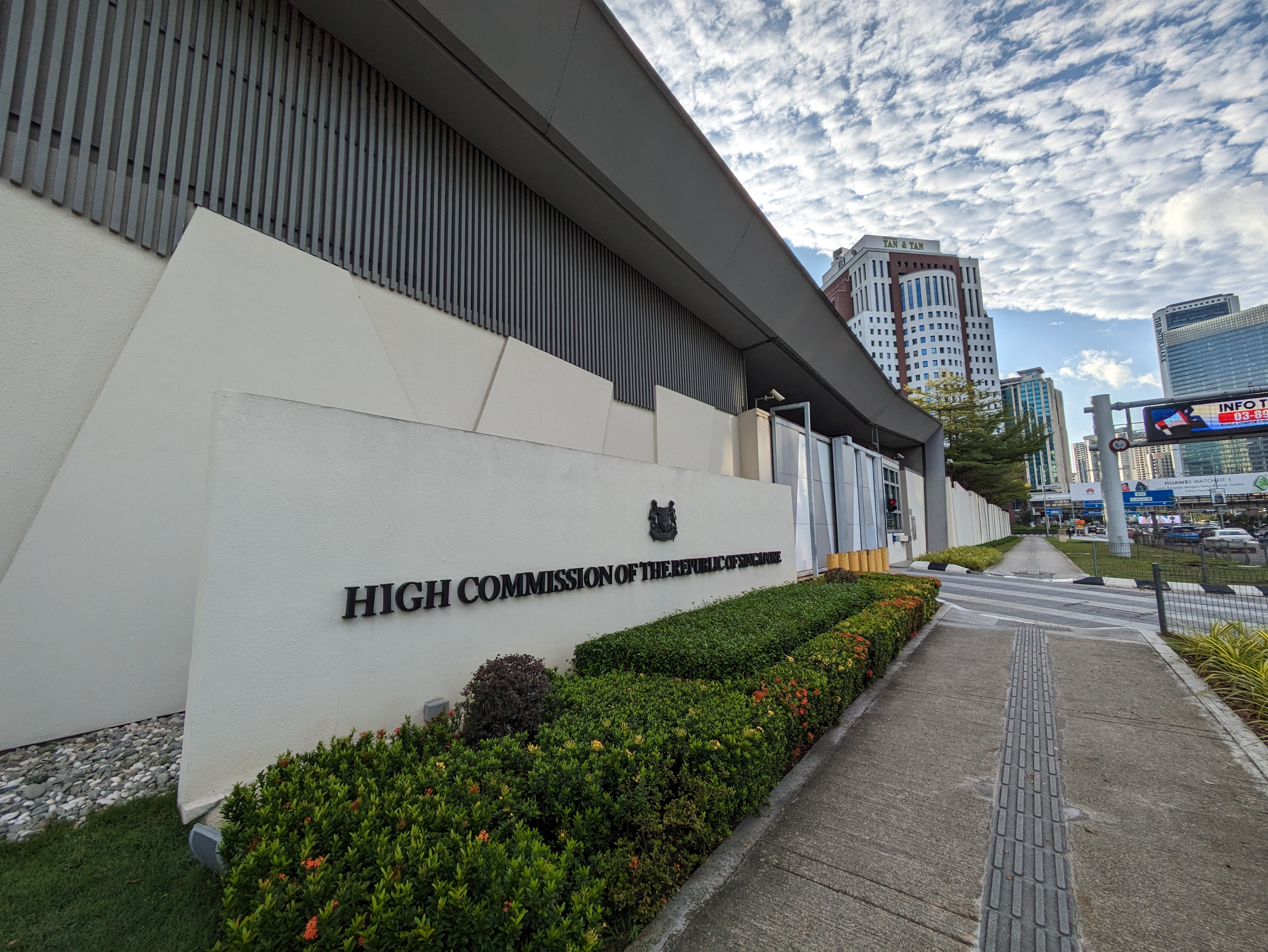
High Commission of Singapore in Kuala Lumpur

Both countries are full members of the Commonwealth of Nations and are founding members of ASEAN.

=== Bilateral relations ===
Singapore and Malaysia enjoy close bilateral relations, and there is an annual Singapore-Malaysia Leaders' Retreat for bilateral talks between the two countries.

Leaders of the two countries

== Socio-economic relations ==
Malaysian Prime Minister Mahathir Mohamad said in 1981: Singapore's success story in the economic and social fields cannot but be a model for Malaysians rather than an object of envy. What we do within our own country is, therefore, contributory and complementary towards each other's progress.

As of 2015, Singapore is Malaysia's biggest trading partner, with imports and exports totalling approximately US$28 billion. Conversely, Singapore's biggest trading partner is China, followed by Hong Kong and Malaysia respectively. Former Malaysian Prime Minister Najib Razak has suggested that both nations can promote regulations and e-commerce, and encourage electronic payments.

Specifically, Malaysia's southernmost state of Johor has enjoyed close bilateral relations with Singapore. Both territories neighbour each other and share natural resources such as water. In addition, Johor and Singapore, together with Indonesia's Riau Islands, form the SIJORI Growth Triangle. Singapore is consistently one of the top sources of foreign direct investments into Iskandar Malaysia, an economic corridor spanning much of southern Johor. Meanwhile, almost 300,000 Malaysians from Johor transit across the two border crossings between Johor and Singapore - the Causeway and the Second Link - on a daily basis, either for work or education opportunities.

In 2018, Singapore Deputy Prime Minister Teo Chee Hean during his visit to Sabah said that they were keen to assist the latter in technical and vocational education in efforts to build up skills for state youths to meet the needs of the state's industries with an invitation to Singapore were also delivered to Sabah Chief Minister Shafie Apdal and other state officials to further discuss about working together on technical skills development for the state youths. Further in 2019, Sarawak opened its trade and tourism office in Singapore to boost investment with several other trade deals were also signed between the two. During a visit by Singapore's senior Minister of State for Trade and Industry Chee Hong Tat to Sabah State Administrative Centre in August, he said Sabah has been an important partner for Singapore over the years and hopes to elevate the relations into further levels with the setting up of a Sabah trade office in Singapore. During the meeting, Chee adding that Singapore are keen to investing in developing tourism hospitality facilities as well on cruise tourism. Sabah Minister of Agriculture and Food Industry Junz Wong also said that Sabah was in the process to form a strategic alliance with Singapore to facilitate and create platforms for the business community of the two and discovering potential trade in agriculture-based manufactured food products.

=== Tourism ===
Singaporeans account for a majority of tourist arrivals into Malaysia, at nearly 13 million as of 2016. Malaysia was also Singapore's third largest market in terms of inbound visitors, contributing 8.5% of the total tourists in the city-state in 2012; tourists from Kuala Lumpur, Sarawak, Penang, Sabah and Perak formed the bulk of Malaysian tourist arrivals into Singapore in that year.

According to a study conducted by the Singapore Tourism Board, Malaysians tend to view Singapore as an extension of their lifestyle rather than a holiday destination, due to the close geographical proximity, cultural similarities and family ties between the two countries. Aside from leisure, 41% of Malaysian tourists in Singapore cited meetings, incentives, conferencing and exhibitions (MICE) as their purpose of visit.

== Cultural relations ==
Malaysia and Singapore share significant historical and cultural affinities, as both countries have multiracial populations consisting of Malays, Chinese and Indians, and had experienced British colonial rule. These are in addition to cross-border family ties due to migration between the two countries. In recent years, more arts and cultural activities have been jointly organised by artists from both sides of the Causeway, including the Titian Budaya showcase in Kuala Lumpur in 2015 and the Causeway Exchange during the George Town Festival that year.

In particular, Singapore is culturally linked with its former fellow Straits Settlements, Penang and Malacca - both of which are now among the 13 Malaysian states. Aside from being governed directly by the British as crown colonies until the mid-20th century, the three territories are renowned for their cosmopolitan populaces, which include the Peranakans. There has been a recent resurgence of Peranakan culture, fuelled by conservation efforts at historic sites and the mass media. One of the key regional events aimed at promoting Peranakan culture is the International Baba Nyonya Convention, which was last held in Penang's capital city of George Town in 2017.

== Security relations ==
Singapore and Malaysia are part of the Five Power Defence Arrangements (FDPA), along with New Zealand, Australia and the United Kingdom, in which the five nations are to consult one another in the event of an armed attack on either Malaysia or Singapore. An Integrated Air Defence System (IADS) for both Malaysia and Singapore was set up at RMAF Butterworth in the Malaysian state of Penang in 1971.

Both countries, along with Indonesia, help each other respond to threats by Jemaah Islamiah (JI).

== Transport links ==
The two countries are connected by the Johor–Singapore Causeway and the Tuas Second Link. The Second Link is a bridge connecting Singapore and Johor, Malaysia. In Singapore, it is officially known as the Tuas Second Link. The bridge was built to reduce traffic congestion at the Johor–Singapore Causeway which have been operated since 2 January 1998. The twin-deck bridge supports a dual-three lane carriageway linking Kampong Ladang at Tanjung Kupang in Johor to Jalan Ahmad Ibrahim at Tuas in Singapore. The span over water is 1,920 metres (6,300 ft). On the Malaysian side, the bridge is connected to the Second Link Expressway (Malay: Lebuhraya Laluan Kedua Malaysia-Singapura), also known as Linkedua Expressway, which links from Senai North Interchange Exit 253 at North-South Expressway, Senai Airport and Taman Perling, Johor Bahru via its extension known as Johor Bahru Parkway. In Singapore, the bridge connects to the Ayer Rajah Expressway.

On 7 April 2014, during a joint press conference with Lee Hsien Loong, after the annual Malaysia-Singapore Leaders' Retreat in Putrajaya, Najib proposed a Friendship Bridge between the two countries to strengthen and enhance the relationship between both countries.

The Rapid Transit System (RTS) Link, a high-speed rail line between Malaysia and Singapore, under development, is scheduled to open in 2026. This long-delayed project required the resolution of a dispute between the two countries over transportation links and Singaporean investment in Iskandar Malaysia in 2010. Malaysian and Singaporean counterparts thereby agreed to modify the Points of Agreement signed in 1990. Specifically, the two sides agreed to move the KTM railway station from Tanjong Pagar to Woodlands and created a joint venture to be called M-S Pte Ltd to develop six parcels of Singapore land, develop a rapid transit link between Tanjung Puteri in Johor Bahru and Woodlands in Singapore, and allow Temasek Holdings and Khazanah to set up a joint venture for the purpose of developing a town in Iskandar Malaysia. The deadline to form the aforementioned joint venture company lapsed on 30 June 2018, thus both nations have to decide to mutually extend the deadline or open an international tender for the rail operator.

Singapore and Malaysia also agreed to build the Kuala Lumpur–Singapore High Speed Rail in 2013. The project was expected to be completed by 2026, and would connect Kuala Lumpur and Johor Bahru to Singapore. Under the administration of the new Malaysian government, Prime Minister Mahathir Mohamad however announced that Malaysia have postponed the HSR project while Singapore spent S$250 million (US$184 million) on the project and another S$40 million is expected to be spent from August 2018 till the end of 2018. On 18 July 2018, former Malaysian Prime Minister and opposition member of parliament (MP) Najib Razak questioned the government on the economic impact of cancelling the project. On 1 January 2021, the project's cancellation was announced by the Prime Ministers of both countries as no agreement was reached after the final deadline extension of 31 December 2020 lapsed.

There are also numerous air and sea links between the two countries.

== Other bilateral projects ==
There have been schemes to raise the water levels in Johor's Linggiu Reservoir to meet the needs of both countries. There is an ongoing joint hydrometric modelling study of the Johor River. This has been prompted by the parching of the Reservoir, with its water level dropping to a historic low of 20 per cent after a long spell of rainless days in October 2016. The study aims to help find out why water levels in the Reservoir fell recently, and can also analyse what happens when it rains in Johor, and how this translates into inflows to Linggiu and outflows to the Johor River. The dip in supply was previously pegged to persistent dry weather, as well as large discharges of water to prevent salinity levels downstream from getting too high.

== Embassies ==
Singapore has two diplomatic missions in Malaysia – a High Commission in the Malaysian capital of Kuala Lumpur and a consulate in Johor Bahru. There are plans to open consulates in the East Malaysian states of Sabah and Sarawak. The High Commission of Malaysia in Singapore is located at Jervois Road.

== Disputes and diplomatic incidents ==
Since the separation of Singapore from the Federation in 1965, several other differences developed between Singapore and Malaysia, including a dispute over water prices (under the 1961 and 1962 water agreements) and ownership of Pedra Branca, an island off the coast of Johor.

=== Water conflicts ===
Under the 1962 Water Agreement, Singapore refines up to 250 million gallons of water per day from the Johor River and sells the majority of it back to Malaysia. This right expires in 2061. There has been numerous disputes between the two nations over the fairness of the deal, with Malaysia arguing Singapore is an affluent nation profiting from Malaysia's water resources due to the deal, and Singapore arguing that its treatment of water and subsequent resale of said treated water to Malaysia is done at a generous price, as Singapore makes no economic profit off the resale due to the costs involved in refining the water. Malaysia has threatened to cut off the water supply prematurely to pressure Singapore politically, a move that has sparked tensions between the two states.

=== Territorial dispute ===
On 23 May 2008, the International Court of Justice (ICJ) ruled in favour of Singapore on the question of ownership over Pedra Branca with 12 to 4 votes whereas the UN court ruled almost unanimously in favour of Malaysia regarding its legal ownership of Middle Rocks. In its Judgment, the ICJ expressly noted that Singapore had plans for reclamation at Pedra Branca. Both the microsized features are valued for their respective strategic positions at the junction of the Straits of Malacca and the South China Sea where 40% of global trade passes through on annual basis.

In February 2017, Malaysia filed an application for the revision of the ICJ's judgement. In its filing, Malaysia cited three documents recently declassified by the United Kingdom to support the application. Singapore has set up its legal team to respond to Malaysia's application. The team includes Attorney-General Lucien Wong, Professor S. Jayakumar, Professor Tommy Koh, and former Chief Justice Chan Sek Keong. Responding to the application, Singapore's Prime Minister, Lee Hsien Loong, said: "I am confident of the eventual outcome, because (we have) strong lawyers (and) a strong case".

On 30 June 2017, Malaysia filed a second application, requesting interpretation over the judgement delivered by the ICJ in 2008 over the sovereignty of Pedra Branca. According to Malaysia, this was "separate and autonomous" from the earlier application filed in February 2017, seeking revision of the ICJ judgement. In response, Singapore said that "Malaysia's request for the ICJ to interpret the judgement is puzzling. Singapore will therefore oppose Malaysia's application for interpretation, which we consider to be both unnecessary and without merit. Singapore is committed to resolving these issues in accordance with international law".

To implement the ICJ's judgement in 2008, Malaysia and Singapore have attempted to implement the 2008 judgement through co-operative processes. Both countries established the Malaysia-Singapore Joint Technical Committee (MSJTC) to implement the ICJ's judgement, which was inter alia, tasked with addressing the delimitation of the maritime boundaries between the territorial waters of both countries. According to Malaysia, the MSJTC reached an impasse in November 2013. Malaysia asserted that one of the reasons was both parties being unable to agree over the meaning of the 2008 judgement as it concerns South Ledge and the waters surrounding Pedra Branca.

Malaysia's latest legal bid, according to international experts, could be an attempt by the Barisan Nasional government to stir up nationalist fervour against a convenient, smaller neighbour, Singapore, ahead of a key general election. In the aftermath of the general election under the new government of Pakatan Harapan, Malaysia has dropped its appeal on the Pedra Branca case while announcing plans to convert the Middle Rocks that are under its sovereignty into an island.

=== Maritime and aviation dispute ===
==== Maritime dispute over port limits ====
On 25 October 2018, the Malaysian Attorney General's Chamber announced changes to the port limits for the Johor Bahru Port. This was followed by the Marine Department of Malaysia issuing a Notice to Mariners on 22 November 2018 detailing an extension of the port limits that brought it closer to the Tuas area in Singapore which indeed was previously under Malaysian maritime claims. Tensions have erupted before in the past as Singapore launched a move to reclaim land in the Johore Straits (off Tuas, Singapore and Tanjung Piai, Malaysia) which was in an area of overlapping claims between the 2 respective nations.

In response, the Maritime and Port Authority of Singapore (MPA) issued a circular on 30 November instructing ship masters and owners of vessels to disregard Malaysia's Notice to Mariners. On 4 December 2018, Singapore's Ministry of Transport (MOT) announced that it had lodged a "strong protest" with the Malaysian government over the extension of the Johor Bahru port limits "in a manner which encroaches into Singapore's territorial waters off Tuas". Meanwhile, both nations had started blaming each other for intruding into their own claimed territorial waters. The MOT statement also indicated that vessels from the Malaysian Maritime Enforcement Agency (MMEA) and Marine Department of Malaysia had repeatedly intruded into Singapore's territorial waters off Tuas over the past two weeks, saying that the extension of the Johor Bahru port limits were "a serious violation of Singapore's sovereignty and international law" and "unconducive to good bilateral relations, cause confusion for the international shipping community, and lead to increased navigational and safety risks for all parties."

On 6 December 2018, Singapore's Transport Minister Khaw Boon Wan described Malaysia extension of port limits as a "blatant provocation", and indicated that fourteen intrusions into Singapore's territorial waters had occurred. He also announced that the Republic had extended its port limits off Tuas in response to Malaysia's actions.

==== Aviation dispute ====
On 4 December 2018, Malaysian Transport Minister Loke Siew Fook announced Malaysia's intention to "reclaim" airspace over southern Johor that was previously accorded under an agreement in 1974 to Singapore to provide air traffic control services as Malaysia now had adequate technological, financial, and aviation expertise to control its own airspace. It is sketched begin in phases between 2019 and 2023. He also said that Malaysia would send a protest note to Singapore over the latter's plan to implement an instrument landing system (ILS) at Seletar Airport. Malaysia claimed that the implementation of the ILS would violate Malaysia's sovereignty, independent rights over its own airspace, and also cause restrictions on building heights and port activities that would stunt the development of the Pasir Gudang industrial area. Singapore's Transport Minister Khaw Boon Wan countered Loke's claim by saying that the ILS would not cause any additional restricts or impact, and that cross-border airspace arrangements did not amount to a violation of sovereignty, pointing to other similar arrangements where Malaysia managed airspace over Brunei and Indonesia although both the latters have given full consent to Malaysia in managing civil air traffic in their designated airspaces as both the nations lack the needed expertise in this matter.

On 25 December 2018, the Civil Aviation Authority of Malaysia published a Notice to Airmen (NOTAM) that it would establish an area of permanently restricted airspace over Pasir Gudang from 2 January 2019. Singapore protested the new permanent restricted area on 1 January 2019, saying that the restricted area was in a "controlled and congested airspace" and would affect aircraft travelling through the area.

==== Negotiations ====
On 8 January 2019, following a meeting, the foreign ministers of both countries, Singapore's Vivian Balakrishnan and Malaysia's Saifuddin Abdullah, announced that the implementation of the ILS by Seletar Airport and the permanent restricted airspace by Malaysia would be suspended, and that a working group would be set up to study and discuss the issues relating to the maritime dispute, pending further discussions and negotiations.

On 9 January 2019, Johor Chief Minister Osman Sapian made a visit to one of the Malaysian vessels, MV Pedoman, that were still anchored within the disputed waters and posted photos of the visit on Facebook. This prompted Singapore to suspend the Joint Ministerial Committee for Iskandar Malaysia (JMCIM) talks scheduled for 14 January.

On 14 March 2019, Malaysia and Singapore agreed to mutually suspend the implementation of their overlapping port limits, which effectively represented a reversion to the status quo prior to Malaysia's initial announcement of alteration to the Johor Port limits. Other measures announced included: the suspension of commercial activities in the area; an agreement to not anchor government vessels; and Singapore and Malaysia vessels will operate in the area "in accordance with international law including the United Nations Convention on the Law of the Sea (UNCLOS)".

== See also ==
- Malaysia–Singapore border
- Pedra Branca dispute
- PAP–UMNO relations, the governing parties of Singapore and Malaysia
- Singaporeans in Malaysia
- Malaysians in Singapore
