= PSLV-C56 =

Singapore satellite launch mission

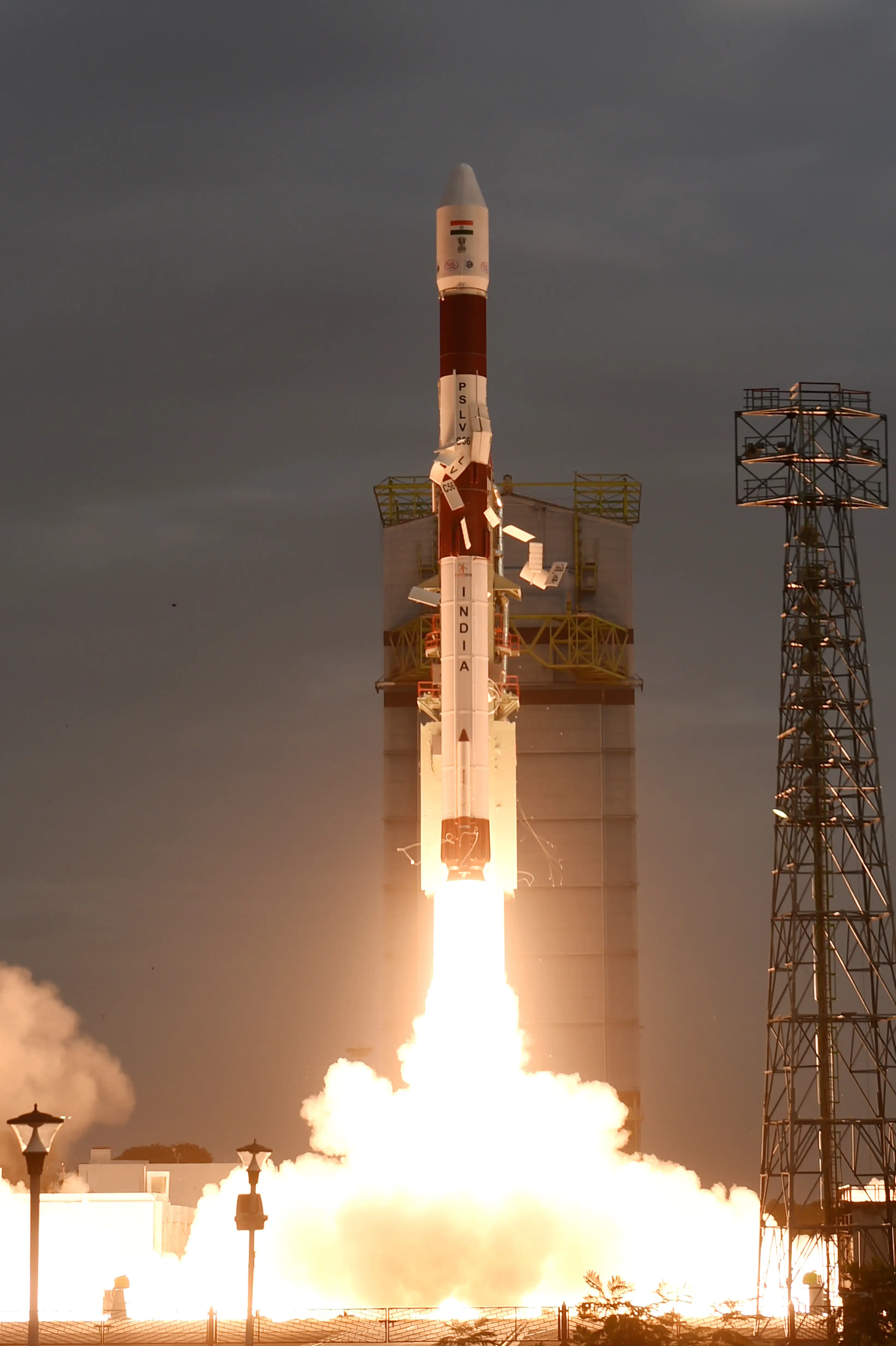
- PSLV-C56, DS-SAR lifts off First Launch Pad (FLP)

launch
- Launch: 30 July 2023; 01:01 (UTC)
- Pad: First Launch Pad Satish Dhawan Space Centre
- Payload: (Singapore) DS - SAR and other 6 Co - Passenger Satellites.

PSLV launches

The PSLV-C56 was the 58th mission of Indian Space Research Organisation's Polar Satellite Launch Vehicle (PSLV) and the 17th flight of the PSLV-CA variant, and was launched from Satish Dhawan Space Centre First Launch Pad (FLP).

== Launch ==
It was launched on Sunday, 30 July 2023 at 06:31 IST / 01:01 UTC from Satish Dhawan Space Centre, Sriharikota, Andhra Pradesh, India. This was a dedicated commercial mission through NSIL with DS-SAR as primary satellite and VELOX-AM as a co-passenger satellite with other 5 cubesats, all of which belonged to Singapore.

== Mission overview ==
Primary payload: DS-SAR

Secondary payload: 6 Co - Passenger Satellites

Mission Characteristics
| Parameter | Orbit-1 |
|---|---|
| Alt (km) | 535 |
| Inclination (deg.) | 05.00 |
| Launch Pad | FLP |

PSLV is a 4 stage rocket, its first & third stages use solid fuel (HTBP) and its second & fourth stages use liquid hypergolic fuel.

Propellant:

- Stage 1: Composite Solid (HTBP based)
- Stage 2: Earth Storable Liquid (UDMH + N_{2}O_{4})
- Stage 3: Composite Solid (HTBP based)
- Stage 4: Earth Storable Liquid (MMH + MON3)
