= Singaporeans in India =

Total population
- 4,308

Regions with significant populations
- Chennai · Bangalore · New Delhi · Mumbai · Hyderabad · Visakhapatnam

Languages
- English (Singlish) · Tamil · Mandarin · Malay · Other Indian Languages

Religion
- Hinduism · Buddhism · Taoism · Islam

Related ethnic groups
- Chinese community in India · Indians in Singapore

There is a small community of Singaporeans in India, consisting largely of expatriate professionals from Singapore and their families as well as international students at Indian universities, including the citizens of India who identify themselves to be of Singaporean descent. Most of them are Singaporeans of Indian descent along with a small number of Chinese Singaporeans working there and they live mainly in Chennai and Bangalore.

== Overview ==
With India following in China's footsteps as an economic powerhouse, many Singaporeans have been relocating there, mostly to Chennai, Bangalore, Mumbai and New Delhi. In 2005, the Indian High Commission issued 60,000 business and travel visas to Singaporeans. A large number of Singaporeans based in Chennai consists mainly of businessmen. There are now about 500 Singaporeans in India for business purposes. It is estimated that the number of Singaporeans working in India has gone up by about 20 per cent annually in the last three to five years.

Students, too, have been flocking to India for internships. In 2007, 91 students from the Singapore Management University (SMU) migrated to India for such internships. Internships in India also made up more than one-third of all overseas internships at SMU.

== Education ==
List of Singaporean International schools in India:

- Singapore International School, Mumbai

== Notable people ==
- Gayatri Shunmugam - Singaporean model and beauty queen
- Anandha Kannan - late Singaporean actor, radio presenter & Tamil comedian
- Priyadarshini - playback singer, researcher and performer whose works are predominantly in the Tamil, Kannada, Telugu and Hindi cinema industries.
- Shabir - Singaporean singer-songwriter, record producer, music composer and performer
- Vincent Subramaniam - Singaporean football manager

== See also ==
- India–Singapore relations
- Indians in Singapore
- Chinese community in India
