= Singaporeans =

People of Singapore

Warga Singapura (Malay) 新加坡人 Xīnjiāpō Rén (Chinese) சிங்கப்பூரர் Ciṅkappūrar (Tamil)
- Flag of Singapore

- Chinese (East Asian), Malay (Southeast Asian), and Indian (South Asian) women in Singapore, circa 1890. To promote racial harmony among the three main races, a Racial Harmony Day has been observed every year since 1997.

Total population
- Singaporeans: 3,660,700 (Note: As of 2025.)

Regions with significant populations
- Diaspora total: ~350,000 (Note: This number is fluid and includes Singaporeans and people of Singaporean descent who renounced their citizenship, statistics of overseas Singaporeans retaining their citizenship stands at 221,600 as of 2025.)
- Malaysia: 91,002
- Australia: 64,739
- United Kingdom: 58,432
- United States: 39,018
- Indonesia: 23,524
- China: 12,799
- Canada: 12,582
- Bangladesh: 9,709
- New Zealand: 5,734
- India: 4,155
- Netherlands: 4,126
- Philippines: 3,390
- Japan: 2,735
- Germany: 2,638
- France: 2,512
- Switzerland: 2,349
- Vietnam: 1,830
- Brazil: 1,210
- Norway: 1,000
- Sweden: 1,000
- Denmark: 1,000
- Malta: 1,000
- Mexico: 1,000
- Finland: 1,000

Languages
- Languages of Singapore; Lingua franca: English ( Standard Singapore English; Singlish), Bazaar Malay (historical); Official languages of Singapore: English; Mandarin; Malay; Tamil; Other non-official heritage languages: Hokkien; Teochew; Cantonese; Hakka; Hainanese; Javanese; Punjabi; Malayalam; Baba Malay (endangered); Kristang (endangered)

Religion
- Buddhism; Christianity; Islam; Taoism; Hinduism; Sikhism; Confucianism; Judaism; Jainism; Zoroastrianism; Chinese folk religion

Related ethnic groups
- Overseas Singaporean

Singaporeans are the citizens of the island city-state of Singapore. Singapore is home to a people of a variety of origins, with the city-state itself being a multi-racial and multi-cultural country. Singaporeans of Chinese, Malay, Indian and Eurasian descent have made up the overwhelming majority of the population since the 19th century. The Singaporean diaspora is also far-reaching worldwide.

In 1819, the port of Singapore was established by Stamford Raffles, who opened Singapore as an entrepôt on the southern coasts. Over the decades, many immigrants from the region settled in Singapore. By 1827, the population of the island was composed of people from various ethnic groups. The Singaporean identity was fostered to help different groups integrate and identify collectively with the nation, while preserving the culture and traditions of each community without forcing minority cultures to assimilate into a single majority culture.

According to a 2017 survey by the Institute of Policy Studies, 49% of Singaporeans identify with both the Singaporean identity and their ethnic identity equally, while 35% would identify as "Singaporeans" first and 14.2% would identify with their ethnic identity. As of 2025, the total population of Singaporeans stands at 3,660,700 and the population of overseas Singaporeans stands at 221,600.

== Overview ==
=== Early years ===
The earliest records of settlement on the island date back to the 2nd century, where the island was identified as a trading port which was part of a chain of similar trading centres that linked Southeast Asia with the Tamils in South Asia and the Mediterranean in Europe. The earliest settlers of the island were known as the Orang Laut, and the island was an outpost of the Srivijaya Empire until it was invaded by the Tamil Emperor Rajendra Chola I of the Chola Empire in the 11th century. According to the 19th century Chinese record Investigation of Southern Pacific (南洋蠡測) (Nanyang Li Ce), it described the presence of Chinese tombs in Singapore. Words and inscriptions recording the period of Later Liang and Emperor Gong of Song were found on these tombs and this may suggest that from the 8th to 13th centuries, some Chinese had settled, lived, died and were buried in Singapore.

A small Malay polity, known as the Kingdom of Singapura, was founded in 1299 by a fleeing Srivijayan prince, Sang Nila Utama, who was crowned as the Raja of the new state. It was largely Hindu–Buddhist. After the fall of the kingdom in 1398, the island fell under the suzerainty of the Majapahit and subsequently the Malacca Sultanate until its destruction by Portuguese raiders in 1613. Afterwards, Singapore fell into obscurity from the 17th to 18th centuries. Prior to the arrival of Raffles in 1819, there were about a hundred indigenous Malays living on the island under the Johor Sultanate. Most of the indigenous Malays came from the Malay Archipelago. There were an estimated 150 people living on the island, who were predominantly the Orang Laut with small population of 120 Malays who were the followers of Temenggong Abdul Rahman, and about 20 to 30 Chinese.

=== Modern Singapore ===
The majority of Singaporeans today are descendants of immigrants who settled on the island when Singapore was founded as a British trading port by Raffles in 1819, except for the Malays who are indigenous to the region of Malaya. At that time, Raffles decided Singapore would be a free port and as news of the free port spread across the archipelago, Bugis, Javanese, Peranakan Chinese, South Asian and Hadhrami Arab traders flocked to the island, due to the Dutch trading restrictions. After six months of Singapore's founding as a free port, the population increased to 5,000, with the first census of 1824 showing that 6,505 out of the 10,683 total were Malays and Bugis settlers. Within the first few months of becoming a British settlement, a large number of Chinese migrants also started to settle on the island. In 1825, the population of the island had passed the ten thousand mark and by the census of 1826, there were more Chinese with a population of 6,088, as compared to 4,790 Malays excluding the Bugis and Javanese.

By 1871, due to the influx of migrants from Malaya, China, India and other parts of Asia, Singapore's population had reached nearly 100,000, with over half of them being Chinese. Many of these early migrants were predominantly male and they would usually return to their home countries after they had earned enough money. By the early to mid twentieth century, an increasingly significant number of migrant workers chose to stay permanently, with their descendants forming the bulk of Singapore's population today.

In 1957, Singapore attained self-governance and Singaporean citizenship was granted to selected residents who were born in Singapore or the Federation of Malaya, British citizens who had been resident for two years, and others who had been resident for ten years. On September 16, 1963, all Singaporeans effectively became Malaysian citizens as Malaya, Singapore, North Borneo and Sarawak were merged to form Malaysia. However, about two years after the merger, Singapore seceded from Malaysia on August 9, 1965, and Malaysian citizenship was withdrawn from Singaporean citizens. Singaporean nationality law was incorporated into the new Constitution of Singapore. The constitution repealed the 1957 Ordinance, and all persons who were citizens as of 16 September 1963 by virtue of the Ordinance continued to be Singaporean citizens.

Today, Singaporean citizenship is granted by birth, by descent, or by registration. Although provided for in the Constitution, citizenship by naturalisation is no longer granted. The government instead uses the constitutional provision for citizenship by registration to grant citizenship to resident aliens.

== Racial and ethnic groups ==
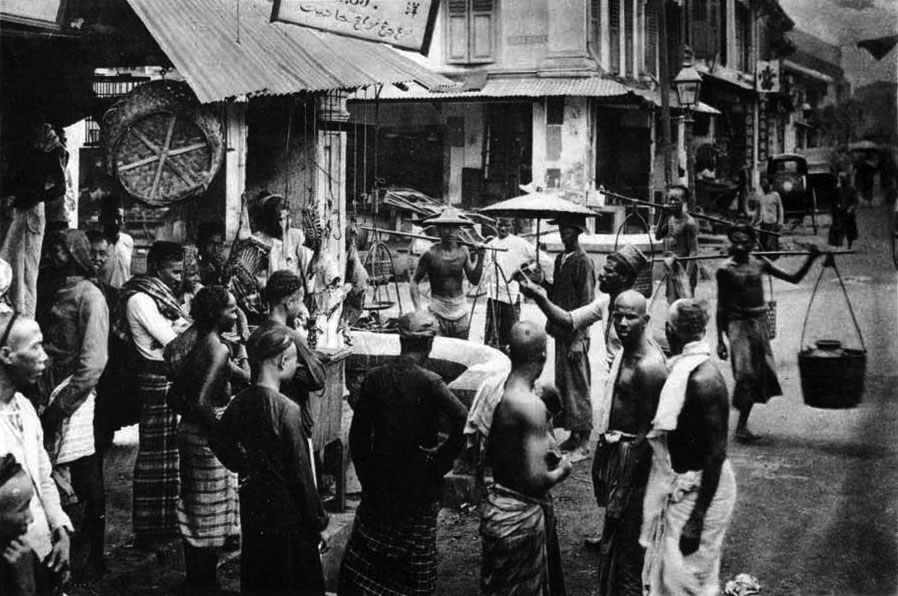
Men of Chinese, Malay, and Indian ethnicities gather at a street corner in Singapore, circa 1900.

Singaporeans by ethnic groups (2025)
Ethnicity of Singaporeans
Chinese	75.5%
Malay	15.1%
Indian	7.6%
Others	1.8%

Singaporeans with Chinese ancestry make up 75.5% of the citizen population of 3,660,700, Malays make up 15.1%, Indians 7.6%, and residents of "other" descent 1.8%, as of 2025. To avoid physical racial segregation and formation of ethnic enclaves common in other multi-racial societies, the Singaporean government implemented the "Ethnic Integration Policy" (EIP) in 1989, where each block of public housing units are sold to families from ethnicities roughly comparable to the national average.

Today, the Chinese–Malay–Indian–Others (CMIO) model is the dominant organising framework of race in Singapore. The country celebrates Racial Harmony Day to commemorate the 1964 race riots in Singapore, which resulted in 36 people dying and 560 suffering severe injuries, and to remember the consequences of racial disharmony the country experienced during the riots.

Singaporeans of other ethnicities, notably Arabs, Armenians, Eurasians and Sri Lankans, are classified into broader ethnic groups under the CMIO model. For example, Javanese are classified under the "Malay" ethnic group, Peranakans under "Chinese" and Sikhs under "Indian". There is some debate over the CMIO model, as certain subgroups argue that they do not identify with the broader categories it assigns.

== Culture ==
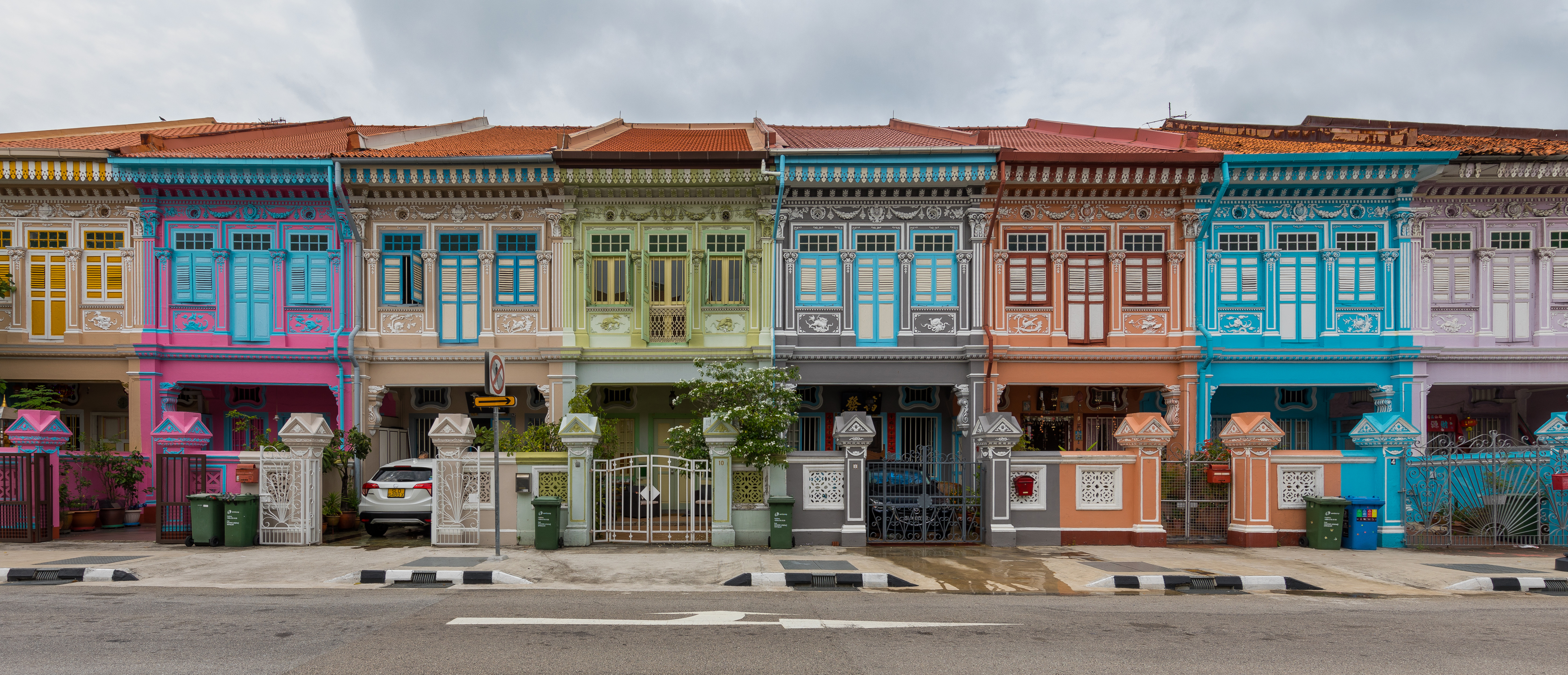
Shophouses in Singapore

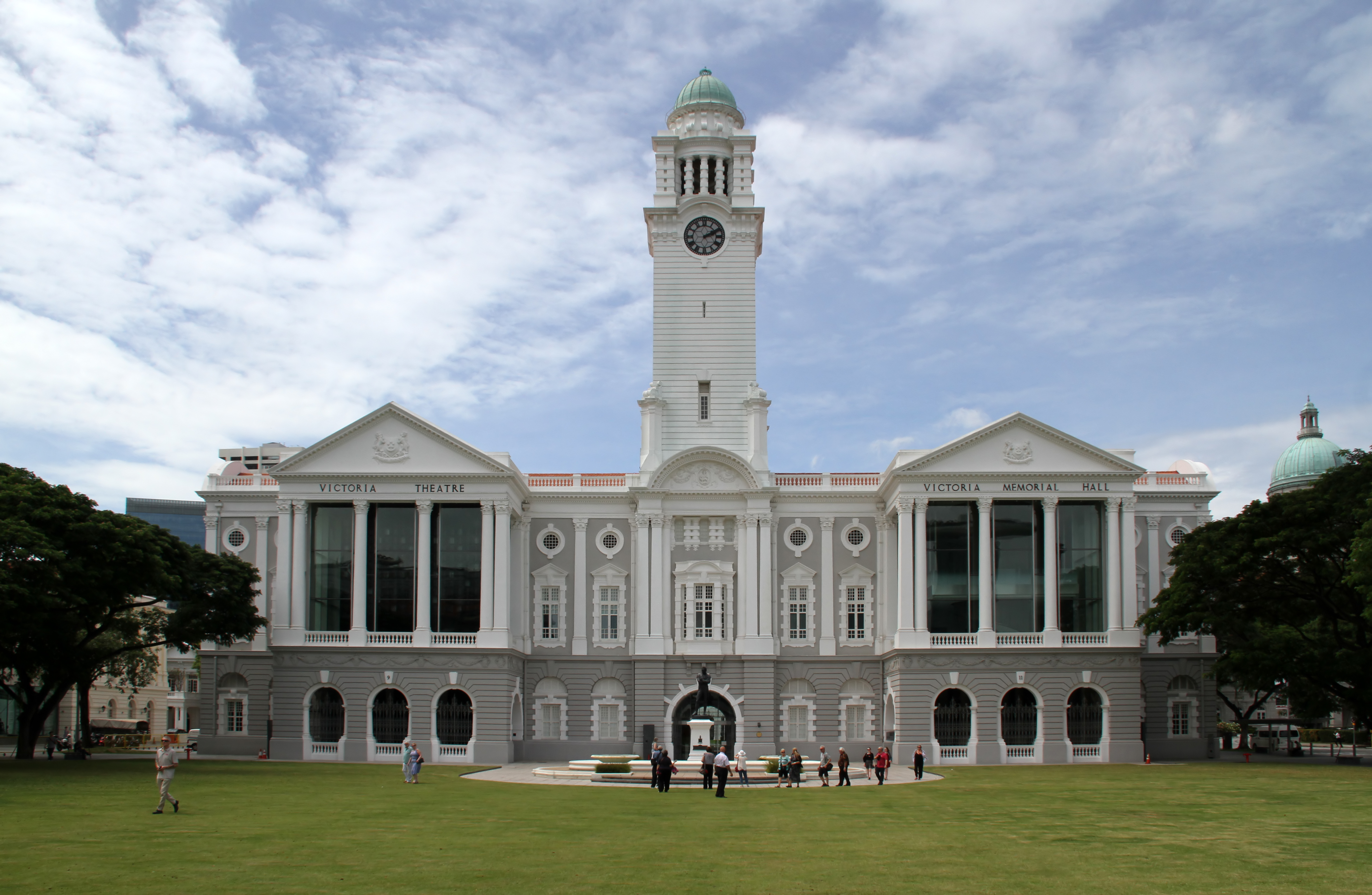
Victoria Theatre and Concert Hall

Singaporean culture is a mix of Asian and European cultures, the latter particularly from the British, with Asian influences from the Malay, Indian, Chinese and Eurasian cultures. This is reflected in the architectural styles of buildings in several distinct ethnic neighbourhoods, such as Little India, Chinatown and Kampong Glam. Singlish is a local contact language that is primarily and understandably English with a local accent and smattering of words from Malay, Hokkien, Teochew, Cantonese and Tamil used by Singaporeans in an informal setting. Due to Singapore's diverse ethnic makeup, the Singapore Constitution prohibits discrimination based on ethnicity, race, religion, denomination, descent, and place of birth. The state thus promotes the cultural diversity of multiculturalism and multiracialism, instead of a single cultural assimilation.

About 70% of Singaporeans also identify with other ethnic cultures in Singapore, notably the Chinese, Malay and Indian cultures. Major festivals including Chinese New Year, Hari Raya Puasa, Deepavali, Vesak Day, Christmas, Good Friday, Easter, and New Year's Day which are celebrated by the different major racial and religious groups are designated as public holidays.

Former Prime Ministers of Singapore, Lee Kuan Yew and Goh Chok Tong, have stated that Singapore does not fit the traditional description of a nation, calling it a society-in-transition, pointing out the fact that Singaporeans do not all speak the same language, share the same religion, nor have the same customs. Each Singaporean's behaviours and attitudes are influenced by, among other things, his or her home language and his religion. Singaporeans who speak English as their native language tend to lean toward Western culture and Christian culture, while those who speak Chinese as their native language tend to lean toward Chinese culture and Confucianism. Malay-speaking Singaporeans tend to lean toward Malay culture, which itself is closely linked to Islamic culture.

=== Cuisine ===
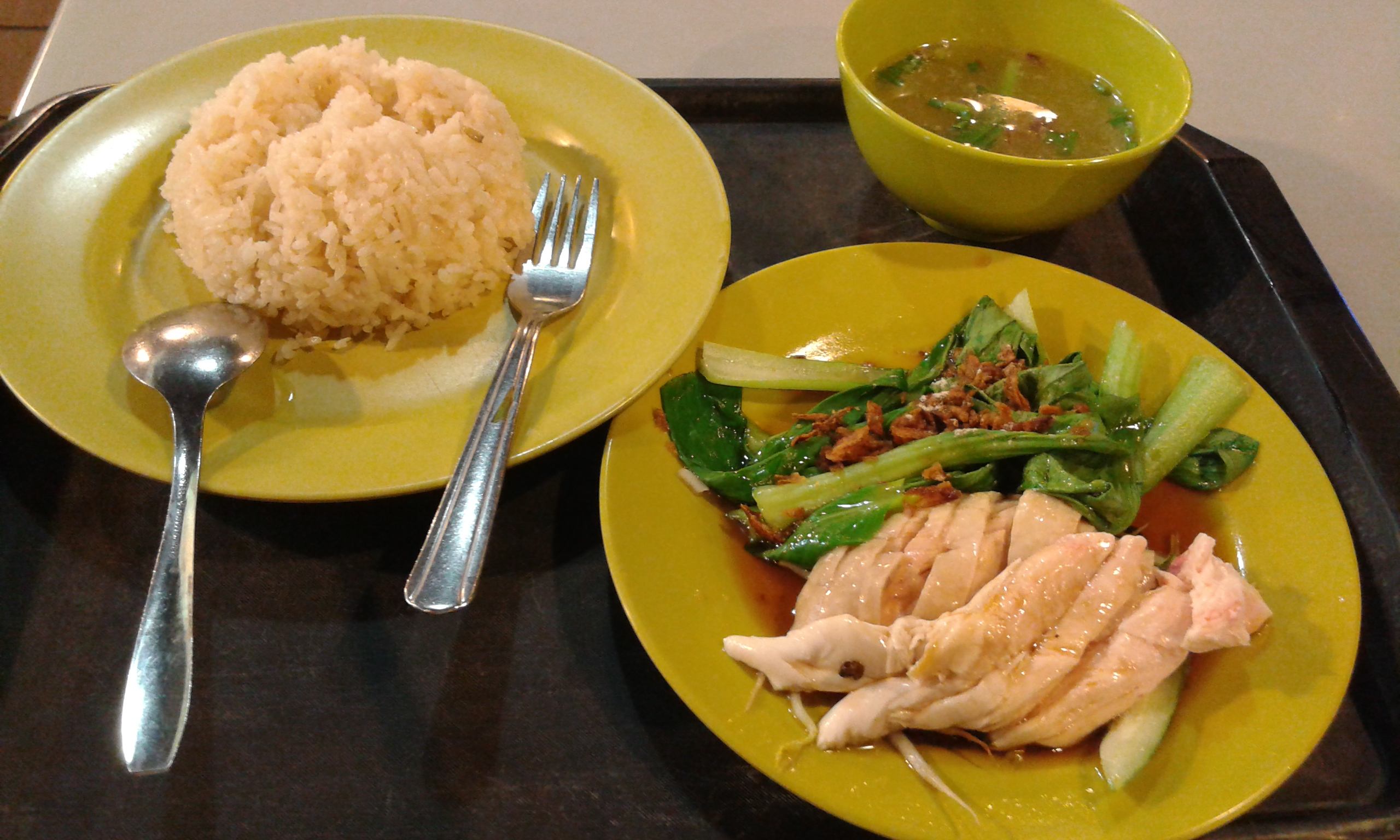
Hainanese chicken rice

Singaporean cuisine has been largely influenced by different cultures because of its position as an international shipping port since its founding as a British port in 1819. The main influences on Singaporean cuisine came from Chinese, Malay and Indian cuisines, similar to the ethnic makeup of Singaporeans. It is believed that certain dishes that are part of Singaporean cuisine today predates the arrival of Raffles in 1819, some of these dishes include laksa, biryani and betel quid. However, it is unknown when these dishes arrived in Singapore, as historical records on them are largely scattered and inaccurate.

A large part of Singaporean cuisine centres around the hawker culture in the country. Hawker stalls first began around mid 1800s and were largely made up of street food stalls selling a huge variety of foods. From 1971 to 1986, the government moved thousands of hawkers off the streets into cleaner and better hawker centre facilities. In 2020, the hawker culture in Singapore was listed by UNESCO as an Intangible Cultural Heritage. Due to the affordability and wide variety that a hawker centre provides, Singaporeans prefer to dine out rather than cook after work.

Some well-known Singaporean dishes includes kaya toast, chilli crab, fish head curry, laksa and roti prata. The Hainanese chicken rice is also widely considered to be one of Singapore's national dish.

=== Language ===
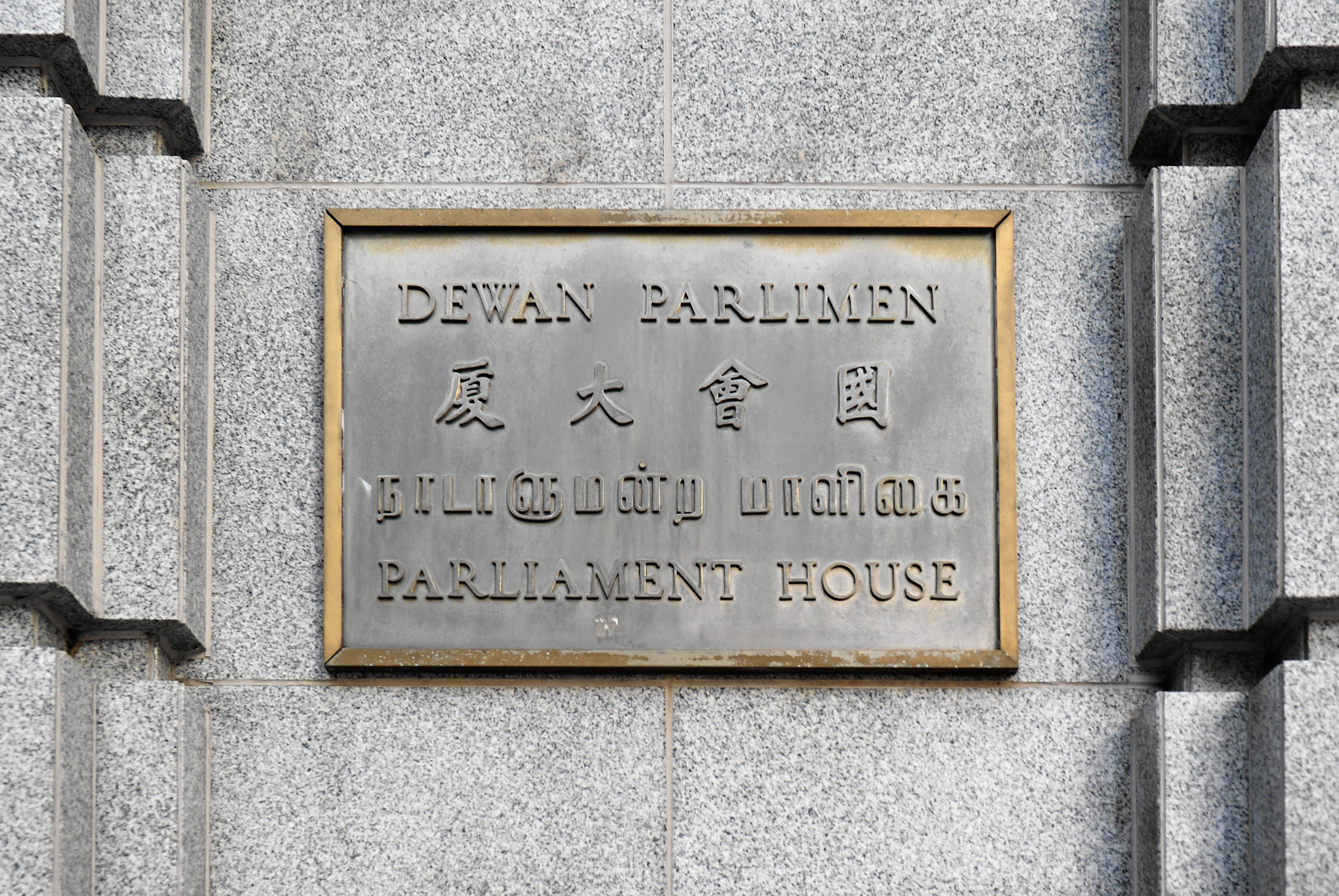
Quadrilingual sign for Parliament House

Singapore's historical roots as a trading settlement gave rise to an influx of foreign traders, and their languages were slowly embedded in Singapore's modern day linguistic repertoire. With the influx of traders into Singapore, Bazaar Malay (Melayu Pasar), a creole of Malay and Chinese, emerged as the lingua franca of the island, which was the language of trade in the Malay Archipelago. However, under the British colonial government, English gained prestige as the language of administration, law and business in Singapore, and eventually displaced Bazar Malay as the bridging language among the population. As government administration increased, infrastructure and commerce developed, and access to education further catalysed the spread of English among Singaporeans.

Today, Singapore has four official languages, English, Malay, Mandarin, and Tamil. Malay is the ceremonial national language of the country and is the home language to 13% of the population. Although most of the younger generation of non-Malay people are non-proficient in the Malay language, Malay is used in the national anthem of Singapore and also in citations for Singapore orders and decorations and military parade drill commands. Almost all Singaporeans are bilingual since the introduction of Singapore's bilingual language education policy Singapore English, however, remains the de facto lingua franca spoken by Singaporeans today. It is the main language of instruction in all school subjects except for Mother Tongue lessons and also the common language of administration, law and business. In 2009, more than 20 languages were identified as being spoken in Singapore, reflecting a rich linguistic diversity in the city.

=== Literature ===
Singaporean literature consists of literary works that is written in either of the 4 official languages. Although these works may be considered as literature works to their specific languages, they are also viewed as a distinct body of literature portraying various aspects of Singapore society and forms a significant part of the culture of Singapore.

Singaporean literature in English was first started by the Peranakan community in colonial Singapore during the 1830s. Singaporean English literature first gained notability in 1937, with a poetry known as F.M.S.R. A Poem, written by Teo Poh Leng and was followed by Wang Gungwu's work, Pulse, in the 1950. During the late 20th century, authors such as Edwin Thumboo, Arthur Yap, Robert Yeo, Goh Poh Seng, Lee Tzu Pheng, Chandran Nair and Kirpal Singh were mostly focusing on poetry, which makes up most published works of Singapore writing in English. Authors since the start of the 21st century include Alfian Sa'at and Rachel Heng.

Singaporean literature in Malay can be traced back to 1841. One of the earlier known works of Singaporean literature in Malay was written by Abdullah Bin Abdul Kadir, a Malay scribe, with his work Cherita Kapal Asap. Some of the other earlier known Malay writers include Tuan Simi and Masuri S. N. Singaporean Malay literary works were similar to its Malaysian counterpart before the early 1970s. Many early pioneers of Singaporean literature in Malay relocated to Malaysia before Singapore became independent as they wanted to be part of the larger Malay community in Malaysia due to the common language in writing. By the 1970s, due to the difference in governance between Singapore and Malaysia, literary works in Malay between the two countries became more distinguishable, with Singapore literature in Malay revolving around the themes of freedom, authenticity and criticality.

=== Religion ===
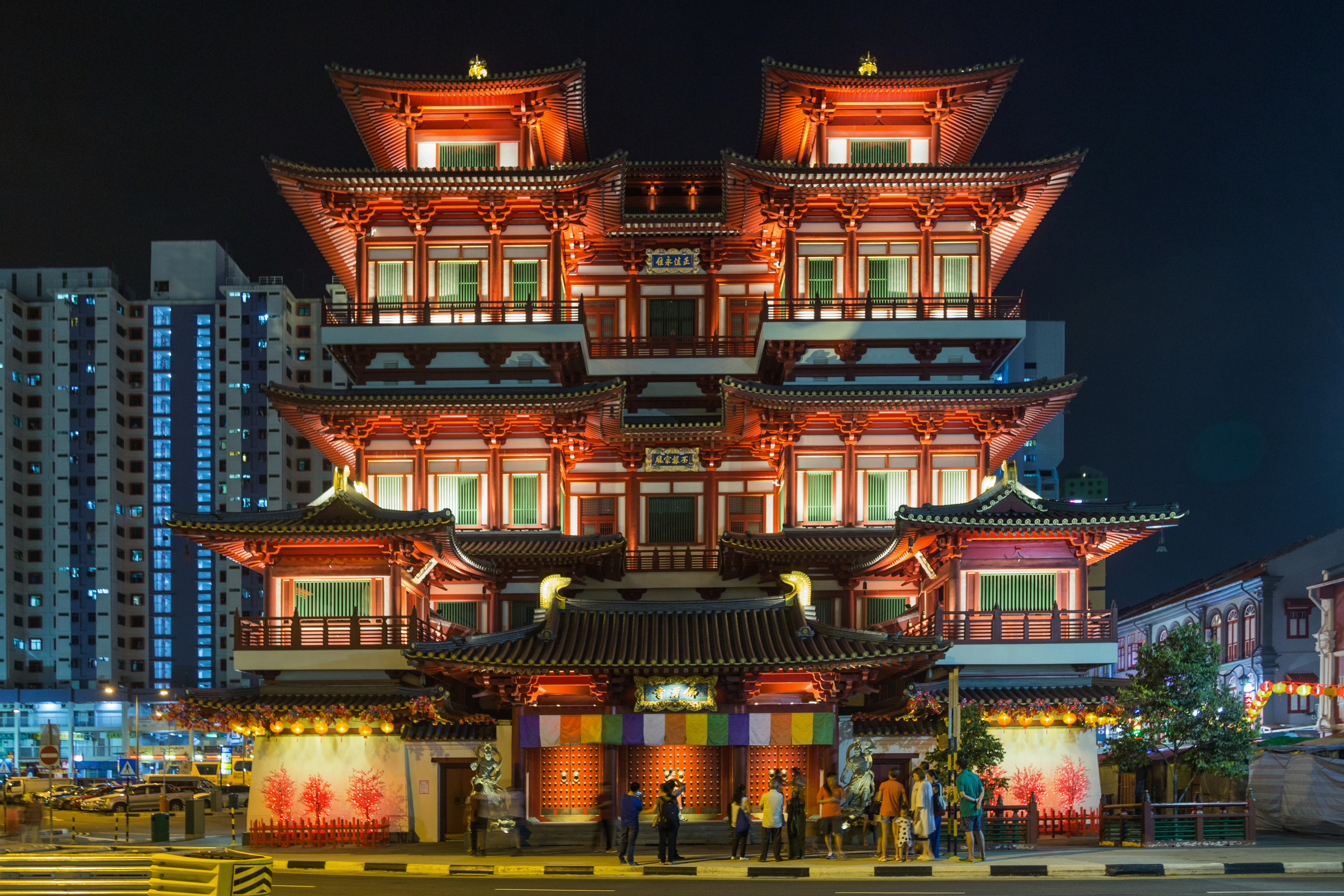
Buddha Tooth Relic Temple and Museum

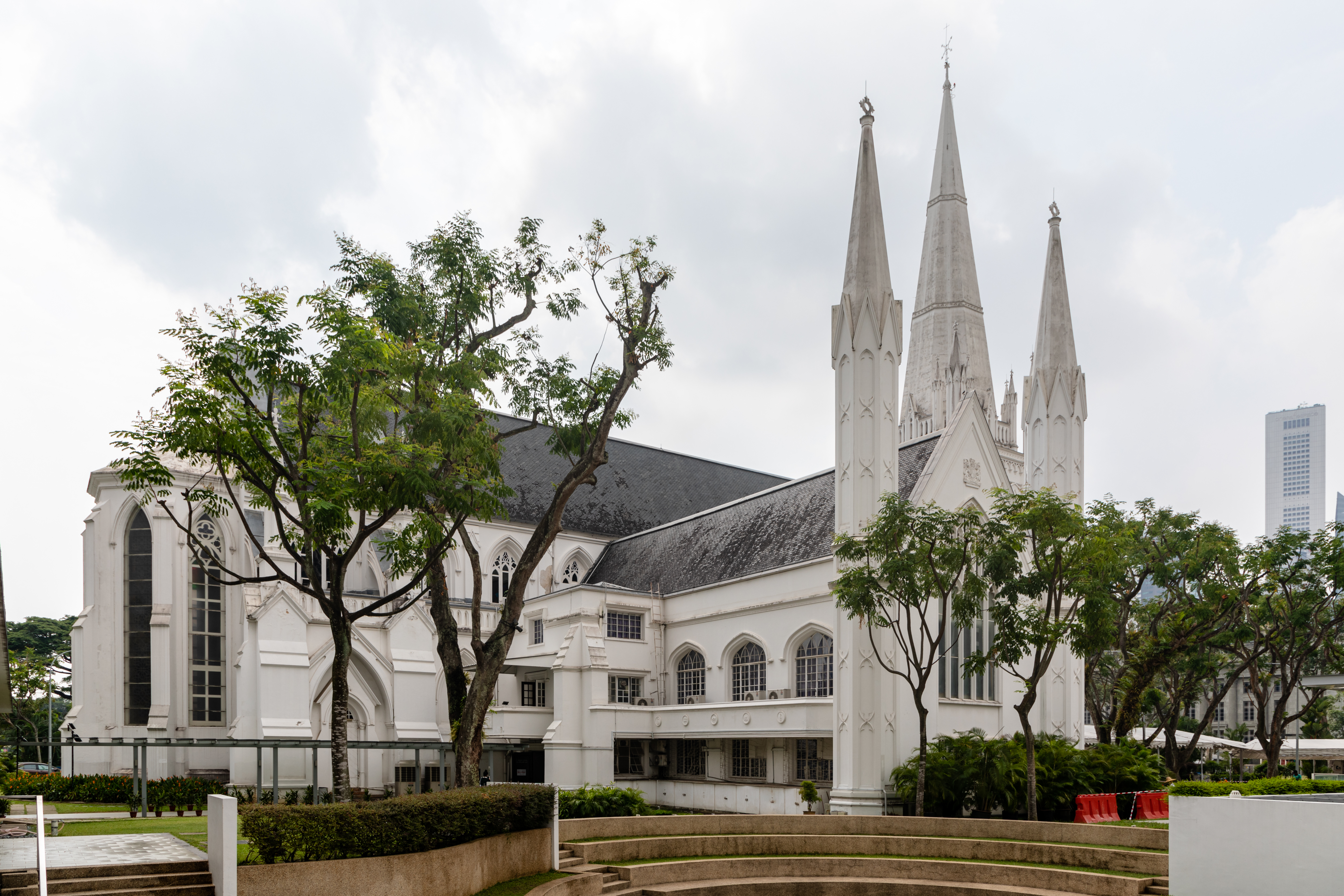
St Andrew's Cathedral

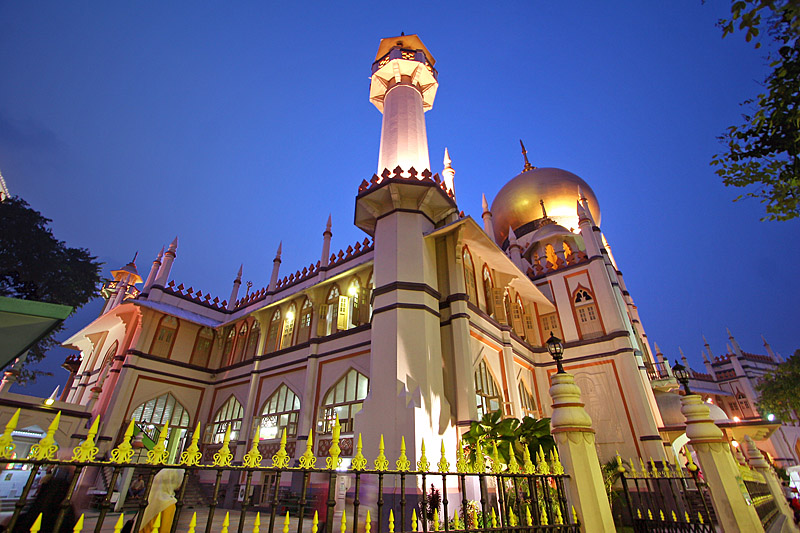
The Sultan Mosque, built in 1826 in the Kampong Glam district, is the oldest and one of the largest mosque in Singapore.

Singapore is the world's most religiously diverse nation, with Singaporeans following various religious beliefs and practices due to the country's diverse ethnic and cultural mix. The Inter-Religious Organisation, Singapore (IRO) recognises 10 major religions being practiced in the city state.

==== 2020 statistics ====
Dharmic religions have the highest number of adherents in Singapore, with 31% of the population practising Buddhism and 5% of the population practising Hinduism in 2020; many Singaporeans are also adherents of Abrahamic religions, with 18.9% of the population identifying as Christian, and 15.6% identifying as Muslim.

Other prominent faiths practised by Singaporeans include Taoism (8.8%), Chinese folk religion, and other Dharmic religions like Sikhism and Jainism. A small percentage of Singapore's population practices Zoroastrianism and Judaism. Twenty per cent do not identify with any religion. Less than 1% of Singaporeans identify as atheist. In addition, practice of hybrid religions is also common such as the incorporation of Taoism and Hindu traditions into Buddhism and vice versa.

Religions Practiced in Singapore, Census Statistics From 2010, 2015 and 2020
Religious group	Population % 2010	Population % 2015	Population % 2020
Buddhism	33.3%	33.2%	31.1%
Taoism and folk religion	10.9%	10.0%	8.8%
Christianity	18.4%	18.7%	18.9%
Catholicism	7.1%	6.7%	No data
Protestantism and other non-Catholic	11.3%	12.0%	No data
Not religious	17.0%	18.5%	20.0%
Islam	14.7%	14.0%	15.6%
Hinduism	5.1%	5.0%	5.0%
Other religions	0.7%	0.6%	0.6%

==== 2022 ====
Research in 2022 suggested that the percentage of Buddhists, Hindus and Christians was going down, while the percentage of Singaporeans following Islam or ‘no religion’ was going up.

== Bibliography ==
- Heidhues, Mary Somers (2001), Southeast Asia: A Concise History, Hudson and Thames, ISBN 978-0-500-28303-5
- Koh, Jamie (2009), Culture and Customs of Singapore and Malaysia, ABC-CLIO, ISBN 9780313351167
- Wright, Arnold (2012), Twentieth Century Impressions of British Malaya: Its History, People, Commerce, Industries, and Resources, Repressed Publishing LLC, (originally first published in 1908), ISBN 9781462298440
