= Huzir Sulaiman =

Singaporean-Malaysian director and actor (born 1973)

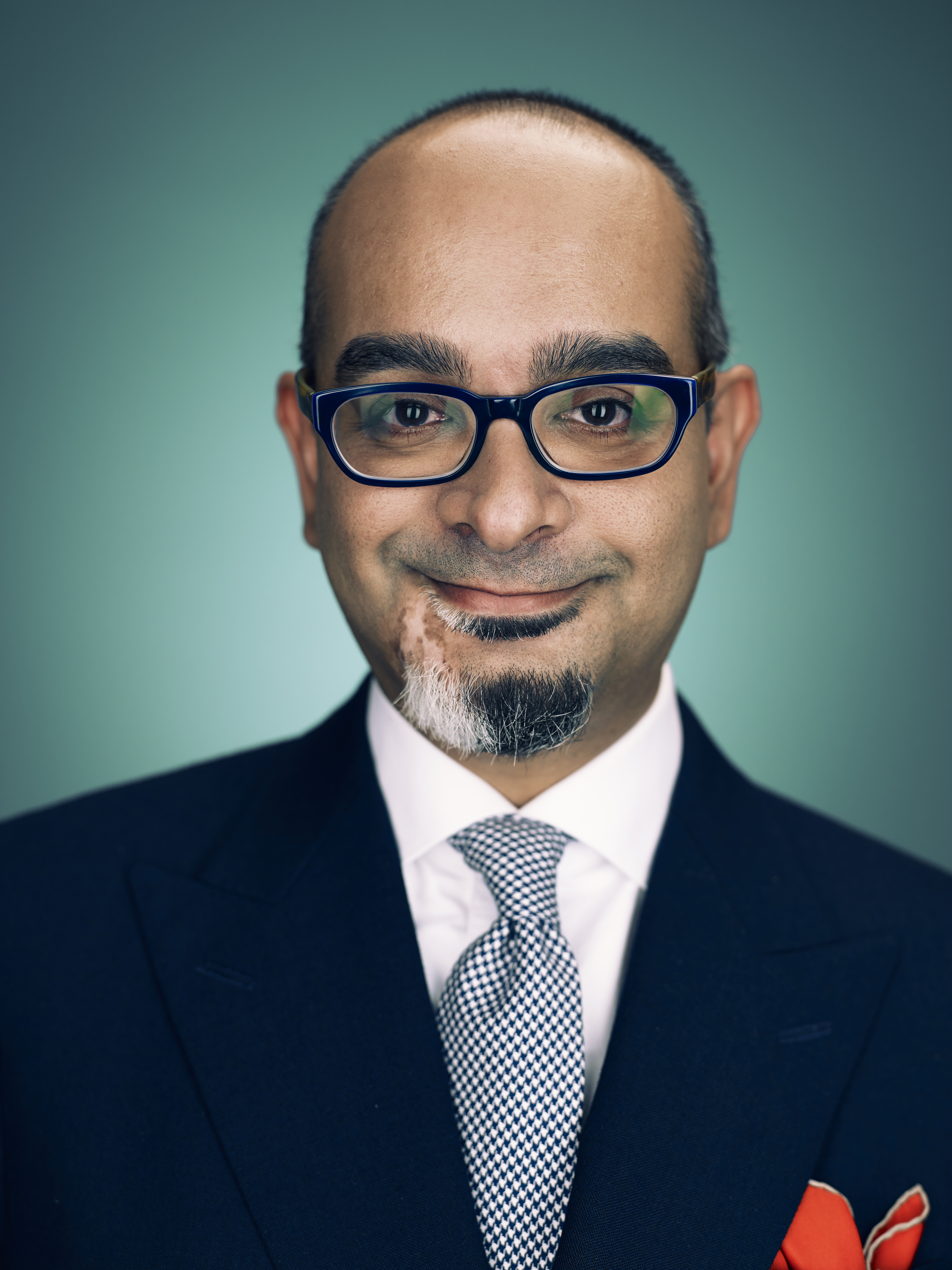
- Born: 8 June 1973 (age 53); Malaysia
- Education: Princeton University
- Occupations: Artistic director; actor; producer; director
- Spouse: Claire Wong (m. 2004)

Huzir Sulaiman (born 8 June 1973) is a Singaporean-Malaysian director and actor. He is the co-founder and Joint Artistic Director of Checkpoint Theatre. A critically acclaimed and award-winning playwright, his Collected Plays 1998-2012 was published in 2013. His essays and commentary pieces have appeared in The Star, The Straits Times and The Huffington Post.

== Theatre career ==
Sulaiman directing includes Thick Beats for Good Girls (2018), FRAGO (2017), The Good, the Bad and the Sholay (2015), Interrogating the Interrogators: Selected Plays of Chong Tze Chien (2015); #UnicornMoment (2014); the 15th anniversary production of Atomic Jaya (2013); City Night Songs (2012); and The Good, the Bad and the Sholay (2011), for which he was nominated for Best Director in the 2012 Life! Theatre Awards. Huzir was educated at Princeton University, where he won the Bain-Swiggett Poetry Prize and is a Yale World Fellow.

== Academic career ==
Currently an Adjunct Associate Professor with the National University of Singapore's University Scholars Programme, Huzir has taught playwriting at the National University of Singapore's English Department; the School of the Arts, Singapore; New York University Tisch Asia; and Nanyang Technological University.

== Other career ==
He also heads Studio Wong Huzir, a creative consultancy.

For a short time in the early part of the 1990s, he hosted an afternoon talk show on WOW FM, a now-defunct Malaysian radio station. He also had a brief television stint starring as Bendul, a Malaysian version of Mr Bean, popularized by Rowan Atkinson.

In the 1990s, Huzir also spent a year writing sketches with the Instant Café Theatre Company before starting the Straits Theatre Company in 1996. He began writing plays in 1997. He also dabbled in film writing, writing the screenplay for the Malaysian film Dukun.

He also contributed articles to The Star and The Huffington Post, and involved himself in the publishing of the online magazine POSKOD.SG.

== Personal life ==
Sulaiman's father was Haji Sulaiman Abdullah (1946-2023), who was born G. Srinivasan Iyer, a Tamil Brahmin who later converted to Islam. Sulaiman was a veteran lawyer who served as Malaysian Bar Council president. His mother was law professor Hajjah Mehrun Siraj (1945-2021), a Commissioner with the Human Rights Commission of Malaysia, daughter of women's rights activist Khatijun Nissa Siraj (1925-2023).

Sulaiman married Claire Wong, a lawyer, actor and director, in 2004. Sulaiman is a permanent resident in Singapore.

== Director ==
Theatre
Year	Title	Notes
1998	Atomic Jaya	Performed by Jo Kukathas on 11 March 1998 at The Actors Studio Theatre, Kuala Lumpur.
2006	A Language of Their Own	It was debuted in 2006 in Singapore, produced by Checkpoint Theatre.
2007	Cogito	A commission of the Singapore Arts Festival 2007, it opened at the Drama Centre, Singapore on 13 June 2007. It was produced by Checkpoint Theatre. It debuted in Australia on 9 February 2012 at La Mama Theatre, Melbourne.
2011	The Good, the Bad and the Sholay	Written by Shiv Tandan and co-directed with Huzir Sulaiman, it first premiered at the NUS Arts Festival 2011 as a NUS Stage and Checkpoint Theatre production. It was nominated for Best Original Script, Best Director and Production of the Year at the Straits Times Life! Theatre Award.
2012	City Night Songs	It was written and composed by its performers Gani Abdul Karim, Oon Shu An, Nessa Anwar, Judy Au, Nishant Jalgaonkar, Ivan Surya Tjahyo, and Joel Tan under the eye of Huzir Sulaiman. It was produced by Checkpoint Theatre with NUS Stage.
2013	Atomic Jaya	Performed by Claire Wong and Karen Tan (actor). This edition of the play was presented by Checkpoint Theatre at School of the Arts (SOTA) Drama Theatre from 24 October to 1 November 2013.
2014	#UnicornMoment	Written and performed by Oon Shu An and co-directed with Shiv Tandan. It was a collaboration with Esplanade – Theatres on the Bay and Checkpoint Theatre. It ran from 8 to 10 May 2014 at Esplanade Theatre Studio.
2014	(+65) Singapore Calling	Co-directed with Claire Wong. Presented by Checkpoint Theatre and Playwriting Australia, in conjunction with the National Play Festival, and with support from the Singapore International Foundation.
2015	The Good, the Bad and the Sholay	Co-directed with Shiv Tandan. It was presented as a collaboration between Checkpoint Theatre and Esplanade – Theatres on the Bay for Kalaa Utsavam – Indian Festival of Arts.
2017	FRAGO	Written by Lucas Ho and produced by Checkpoint Theatre. It ran from 13 to 23 July at the Drama Centre Black Box in Singapore. Its ensemble cast was made up of Ali Anwar, Adib Kosnan, Chong Woon Yong, Alfred Loh, Timothy Nga, Zaaki Nasir, Cerys Ong, Stanley Seah, Derrick Tay, Jo Tan, and Tan Sieow Ping.
2018	Thick Beats for Good Girls	Directed and dramaturge. Written and performed by Pooja Nansi and Jessica Bellamy. It was held at the Drama Centre Black Box.
2020	Two Songs and a Story	Created, directed and dramaturge. Co-directed with Joel Lim.
2021	The Music of Checkpoint Theatre	Co-directed with James Khoo.
2021	Vulnerable	Directed and dramaturge. An 8-part podcast is available for listening on Spotify, SoundCloud, and YouTube. Two new episodes released every two days from 17 June.
2021	Session Zero	Directed and dramaturge.
2022	Chamber Readings: The Weight of Silk on Skin by Huzir Sulaiman	Directed and playwright.
2023	Brown Boys Don't Tell Jokes	Written by Myle Yan Tay.
2023	Tender Submission	Co-directed with Chen Yingxuan. Written by Lucas Ho.
2024	Secondary: The Musical	Directed

== Plays ==
Theatre
Year	Title	Notes
1997	Lazy Hazy Crazy	This was Huzir's first full-length solo show after starting the Straits Theatre Company.
1998	Atomic Jaya	First presented on 11 March 1998. It has been re-staged three times since in 2001, 2003, and 2013.
1998	The Smell of Language	Directed by Krishen Jit in 2001, and performed by Huzir Sulaiman. Its premiere was 3 August 1998 at The Actors Studio Theatre in Kuala Lumpur.
1998	Hip-Hopera	It was first produced in 1998, by the Straits Theatre Company.
1999	Notes on Life & Love & Painting	Directed by Huzir Sulaiman in 1999, it was produced again in 2004, directed by Krishen Jit.
1999	Election Day	Directed by Krishen Jit. Directed in 2004 by Claire Wong at The Arts House, Singapore.
2000	Those Four Sisters Fernandez	Directed by Krishen Jit.
2002	Occupation	Directed by Huzir Sulaiman and Claire Wong.
2002	Whatever That Is	Directed by Krishen Jit.
2003	They Will Be Grateful	Directed by Krishen Jit.
2004	Opiume: The Narrator's Tale	It was performed as part of Mark Chan's chamber opera, Opiume. It was commissioned by the Singapore Arts Festival and Hong Kong New Visions Festival in 2004.
2005	Colony of Singapore	Written in under National University of Singapore's (NUS) Art House Writing Fellowship.
2007	Cogito	Commission of the Singapore Arts Festival 2007. Featuring Noorlinah Mohamed, Claire Wong, Neo Swee Lin, and James Shubert.
2011	The Weight of Silk on Skin	Directed by Claire Wong and performed by Ivan Heng.
2016	The Last Bull: A Life in Flamenco	Directed by Claire Wong.
2019	Displaced Persons' Welcome Dinner	Commission of the Singapore International Festival of Arts 2019. Directed by Claire Wong.

== Screenplays ==
Theatre
Year	Title	Notes
2007	Dukun	A Malaysian Horror film released in 2018.

== Publications ==
- Eight Plays (2002, Silverfish Books) ISBN 9834081626
- Huzir Sulaiman: Collected Plays, 1998-2012 (2013, Checkpoint Theatre) ISBN 9789810749026
