= Claire Wong =

Malaysian actor

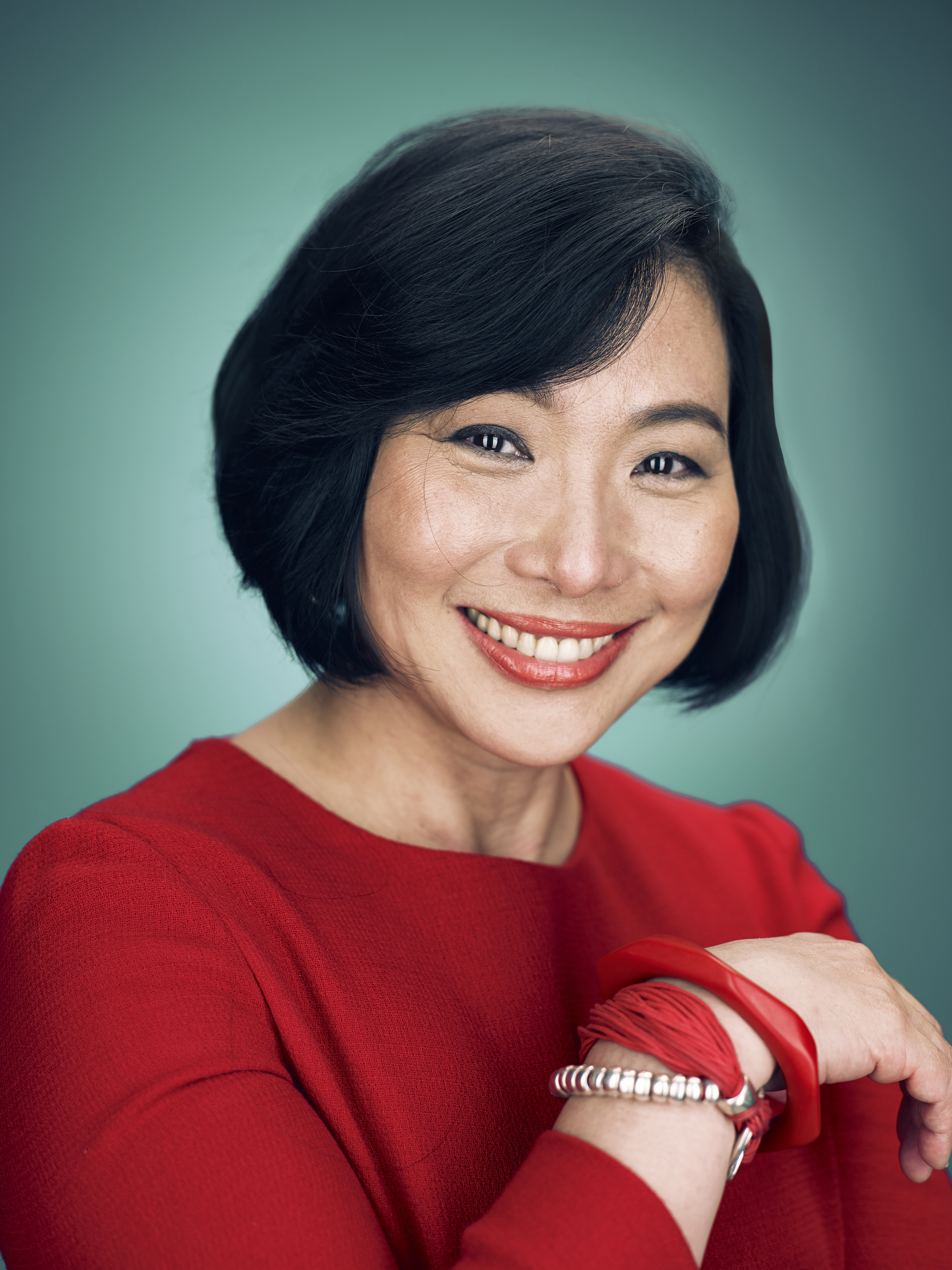
- Born: Penang, Malaysia
- Education: National University of Singapore; Columbia University
- Occupations: Artistic Director, Actor, Producer, Director, Filmmaker
- Spouse: Huzir Sulaiman (m. 2004)

Claire Wong is a Singaporean-Malaysian actor, director, producer, and filmmaker. She is the co-founder and Joint Artistic Director and Producer of Checkpoint Theatre. Wong writes, directs, produces, and acts for the stage and for the camera. She has received training in both Asian and Western performing arts and obtained her post-graduate degree, a Master of Fine Arts (MFA), from Columbia University. Wong's producing and directing credits include: Huzir Sulaiman's The Last Bull: A Life in Flamenco (Singapore Arts Festival, now Singapore Festival of Arts (SIFA) Commission, 2016), Occupation (2012) and The Weight of Silk on Skin (2011); Faith Ng's Normal (2017, 2015), For Better or for Worse (2013) and wo(men) (2010); Joel Tan's The Way We Go (2014). Her play Recalling Mother which was co-written and co-directed with Noorlinah Mohamed, recently played at Esplanade's The Studios (Singapore, 2016) and at the Brisbane and OzAsia Festivals (Australia, 2016 and 2017).

Wong holds a law degree from the National University of Singapore, and practised litigation and corporate law. She is also the co-founder and Senior Consultant of Studio Wong Huzir, a creative consultancy.

== Early life and education ==
Wong was born in Penang, Malaysia to a police officer father and housewife mother and grew up in Kuala Lumpur when her father was assigned to work at the police headquarters there. She was the youngest of five children in the family.

Her siblings include former The Star group chief editor June Wong.

In high school, Wong represented Selangor state in badminton competitions and was appointed the president of the literary, drama and debate society. Upon her graduation, she stayed with her relatives in Singapore and attended National Junior College. She studied the sciences and took part in school plays to further her interest in drama. Wong studied law at the National University of Singapore and obtained her Master of Fine Arts in theatre at Columbia University in New York.

== Legal career ==
Wong practised law first as a litigation associate and later as a corporate partner. Her corporate practice covered both Singapore and the region. She worked initially at the Allen & Gledhill and then as a partner at Helen Yeo & Partners in Singapore.

== Theatre career ==
During the 1990s, Wong performed in leading roles in Ong Keng Sen's post-modern Flowers of Destiny, Madame Mao's Memories, and Desdemona. More recently, she has acted in Huzir Sulaiman's Atomic Jaya, Cogito, and Occupation. Her performance Atomic Jaya garnered her nominations for Best Actress and Best Ensemble Performance in both the Singapore Life! Theatre Awards and the Malaysian Cameronian Arts Awards respectively. She was also nominated for the Best Actress award for Occupation. Wong is a co-founder of creative consultancy Studio Wong Huzir and serves as its Senior Consultant. She was also the Head of Corporate Communications for Rodyk & Davidson, Singapore's first and oldest law firm, where she also oversees the firm's in-house training programme, and is a Joint Artistic Director of Checkpoint Theatre. She left Rodyk & Davidson at the end of November 2014 to spend more time with her elderly parents and focus on theatre.

As a director, she was nominated for Best Director in the Singapore's Life! Theatre Awards for the landmark production of the trilogy of plays by Eleanor Wong, Invitation To Treat (2003). Wong co-directed the Singapore Arts Festival commission Occupation (2002). She received the Life! Theatre Award nomination for Best Director. Her other theatre directing credits include Up North Down South (2002) and Election Day (2004). For the 2006 International Festival of Women in Contemporary Theatre, she co-created and performed in the piece Recalling Mother.

Her screen directing began in 2005, when she wrote and directed a television film, Project Peter, for Singapore's Arts Central channel. She wrote and directed a short film in Malaysia, Instant Noodles and Hot Chocolate, and was the script consultant and performer in That Historical Feeling, a Malaysian short film, which won a Bronze award at the Malaysian Video Awards. Wong has taught at the National University of Singapore, at both the Faculty of Law and in the Theatre Studies department.

== Personal life ==
Wong married Huzir Sulaiman, a director and actor, in 2004. Wong is a permanent resident in Singapore.

== Selected filmography and theatre ==
=== Actor ===
Theatre
Year	Title	Role	Notes
1988	Beauty World	Ivy Chan	
1988	Three Children		
1989	To My Heart With Smiles		
1989	Emily of Emerald Hill	Emily	Excerpts produced by Practice Theatre Ensemble as part of Dramatic Encounters
1991	Mad Forest		
1991–1992	Madame Mao's Memories	Jiang Qing	
1992	Three Children		
1999	Lear	Loyal Attendant	
2000	Desdemona	Desdemona	
2001	The Woman In A Tree On the Hill		
2002	Occupation		Nominated for Best Actress at The Straits Times Life! Theatre Awards
2002	The Office		
2003	Atomic Jaya	Multiple characters	Nominated for Best Actress at The Straits Times Life! Theatre Awards Nominated for Best Ensemble Performance at the Malaysian Cameronian Arts Awards
2004	Opiume		
2004	Cogito	Katherine Lee	
2006	Recalling Mother		Co-creator with Noorlinah Mohamed
2013	Atomic Jaya	Multiple characters	
2014	The House Of Bernarda Alba	Bernarda Alba	
2016	Recalling Mother		Written and performed by Claire Wong and Noorlinah Mohamed, presented as part of The Studios 2016 and at Brisbane Festival 2016
2017	Recalling Mother		Written and performed by Claire Wong and Noorlinah Mohamed, presented at OzAsia Festival 2017.
2022	Recalling Mother: Her Lines, My Lines		Written and performed by Claire Wong and Noorlinah Mohamed, presented as part of The Studios 2022.

=== Director ===
Theatre
Year	Title	Notes	Ref
2002	Up North, Down South.		
2002	Occupation	Co-directed with and written by Huzir Sulaiman.	
2004	Election Day		
2004	Invitation To Treat trilogy	Written by Eleanor Wong, Nominated for Best Director at The Straits Times Life! Theatre Awards.	
2008	wo(men)		
2009	Recalling Mother	Produced by Checkpoint Theatre.	
2011	The Power of Notions / Notions of Power		
2011	The Weight of Silk on Skin		
2012	Dream Country: a lost monologue	Co-director.	
2012	Occupation		
2013	For Better or for Worse		
2014	The Way We Go		
2014	(+65) Singapore Calling	Presented by Checkpoint Theatre and Playwriting Australia, in conjunction with the National Play Festival, and with support from the Singapore International Foundation. Co-directed with Huzir Sulaiman.	
2015	Normal	Produced by Checkpoint Theatre.	
2016	The Last Bull: A Life In Flamenco	Written by Huzir Sulaiman.	
2016	Recalling Mother	Written and performed by Claire Wong and Noorlinah Mohamed, presented as part of The Studios 2016 and at Brisbane Festival 2016	
2017	Recalling Mother	Written and performed by Claire Wong and Noorlinah Mohamed, presented at OzAsia Festival 2017.	
2017	Normal	Produced by Checkpoint Theatre.	
2019	Still Life	Produced by Checkpoint Theatre. Wong was also the dramaturg for this production.	
2019	Displaced Persons' Welcome Dinner	Produced by Checkpoint Theatre.	
2019	Eat Duck	Produced by Checkpoint Theatre.	
2020	The Heart Comes to Mind (An audio experience)	Written by Lucas Ho, The Heart Comes to Mind was a co-production by Esplanade – Theatres on the Bay and Checkpoint Theatre for The Studios 2020. It premiered as an audio recording, as part of the inaugural digital season, The Studios Online, from 16 May – 12 Jun 2020. The video, complementary to the audio recording, was first published on Esplanade Offstage as part of the inaugural digital season, The Studios Online, from 16 May – 12 Jun 2020.	
2021	Keluarga Besar En. Karim (The Karims)	A commission by Esplanade – Theatres on the Bay, as part of Feed Your Imagination (F.Y.I) and Pentas 2021. The Karims was shown online between 29 Sep – 31 Oct 2021. It was available for school bookings from 3 Jan – 1 Apr 2022 as part of Feed Your Imagination (F.Y.I) by Esplanade – Theatres on the Bay.	
2022	Chamber Readings: Occupation by Huzir Sulaiman	Produced by Checkpoint Theatre.	
2022	The Fourth Trimester	Produced by Checkpoint Theatre.	
2022	Recalling Mother: Her Lines, My Lines	Written and performed by Claire Wong and Noorlinah Mohamed, presented as part of The Studios 2022.	
