= Joel Tan =

Singaporean playwright and dramatist

- Born: 25 June 1987 (age 39)
- Occupation: Playwright
- Writing career
- Language: English

Joel Tan (Chinese: 陈文传; pinyin: ‘‘Chén Wén Chuán’’; (born 25 June 1987), is a Singaporean playwright and dramatist.

== Biography ==
Tan is the second son of three; his mother is a nurse and his father is a manager at a maritime company. He was educated at the National University of Singapore (NUS), and spent one semester abroad at the University of Notre Dame. He is currently pursuing a Masters in Dramatic Writing at Central Saint Martins.

== Literary career ==
During his time at NUS, he was mentored by Huzir Sulaiman. He is currently an Associate Artist with Checkpoint Theatre.

Tan is often termed a rising star; his work is described as "beautiful and admirably complex", and has spanned a range of topics, such as single-sex parenting in Singapore, and younger Singaporeans grappling with the impact of progress. His body of work also frequently straddles genre boundaries, including drag theatre, naturalistic plays, and musical theatre.

He has also worked as dramaturge and director for a range of productions.

== Works ==
Plays
Year	Title	Director	Theatre Company	Notes	Ref
2011	Family Outing	Glen Goei	W!LD RICE	for Singapore Theatre Festival	
2012	City Night Songs	Huzir Sulaiman	Checkpoint Theatre and NUS Stage, Singapore	Tan was a team writer, performer, musical director	
2013	Postgrads	Joel Tan	Take Off Productions, Singapore		
2013	The House	Joel Tan	Flamenco Sin Fronteras, Singapore		
2013	The Voices Project	-	Australian Theatre for Young People, Sydney	Tan was a participating playwright.	
2013	Jack and the Beansprout!	Ivan Heng	W!LD RICE	Tan wrote the book and lyrics.	
2013	People	Ng Yin Ling (March); Jonathan Lum (December)	USP Productions (March), Singapore; I Theatre (December), Singapore		
2013	Mosaic	Chen Ying Xuan	Take Off Productions, Singapore	Re-staged in 2015 for M1 Fringe Festival	
2014	Hotel	Engie Ho, Rizman Putra, Peter Sau	The Finger Players, Singapore; commissioned by The Arts House		
2014	The Way We Go	Claire Wong	Checkpoint Theatre, Singapore		
2015	Singapore Inside Out: The Actors' Tour	Tan Kheng Hua	Commissioned by Singapore Tourism Board	Staged in Beijing, New York, and London	
2015	The Emperor's New Clothes	Pam Oei	W!LD RICE		
2016	Cafe	Chen Yingxuan	The Twenty- Something Theatre Festival, Singapore	Nominated for Best Original Script, The Straits Times Life Theatre Awards 2017	
2017	Tropicana the Musical	Beatrice Chia	Tan Kheng Hua, Singapore	Lyrics by Tan, book by Haresh Sharma, music by Julian Wong	
2017	Tango	Tracie Pang	Pangdemonium, Singapore	Nominated for Best Original Script, The Straits Times Life Theatre Awards 2018	
2023	G*d is a woman	Ivan Heng	W!LD RICE	Won Production of the Year and Best Original Script, The Straits Times Life Theatre Awards 2024	
2025	The Serangoon Gardens Techno Party of 1993	Sim Yan Ying	W!LD RICE		

Books
Year	Title	ISBN	Notes
2016	Joel Tan: Plays Volume 1	ISBN 9789810958466	Edited by Lucas Ho
2018	"Tango" in British East Asian Plays	ISBN 9781912430086	Edited by Cheryl Robson, Amanda Rogers & Ashely Thorpe
