= Stella Kon =

Singaporean playwright

- Born: Lim Sing Po; 15 April 1944 (age 82); Edinburgh, Scotland
- Education: National University of Singapore
- Occupation: Playwright

Stella Kon (née Lim Sing Po, born 1944) is a Singaporean playwright. She is best known for her play Emily of Emerald Hill, which has been staged internationally. She is a recipient of the SEA Write Award.

== Biography ==
Kon was born in Edinburgh on 15 April 1944. She grew up in a mansion on Emerald Hill. Kon's mother, Kheng Lim (or Rosie Seow), was an actress who inspired her daughter's love of theatre. Kon's father, Lim Kok Ann, got Kon interested in science and literature. Kon was also related to Lim Boon Keng and Tan Tock Seng who were her paternal great-grandfather and maternal great-great-great-great-grandfather respectively. Kon attended Raffles Girls' School and then went on to the University of Singapore, where she earned a degree in philosophy.

In 1967, after she was married, she moved to Malaysia for fifteen years. For four years, she lived in Britain while her children were in school there. In 1987, she returned to Singapore.

Kon was awarded the Merit Award in the Singapore Literature Prize. In 2008, she won the South East Asian Writers Award. Kon was inducted into the Singapore Women's Hall of Fame in 2014.

== Work ==
Kon was first published in 22 Malaysian Stories (1962), with the work, Mushroom Harvest. Kon won the Singapore National Playwriting Competition for three plays: The Bridge (1977), The Trial (1982) and for Emily of Emerald Hill (1983).

Emily of Emerald Hill is a one-woman play that debuted in 1984 and was directed by Chin San Sooi. The melodrama follows the life of a Peranakan woman who is married into a family she doesn't know at age 14 to a man twice her age. The story was primarily inspired by Kon's grandmother, but also includes stories drawn from the rest of her extended family. The Herald Sun said that the writing in Emily was "colorful and smartly written." The Honolulu Star-Bulletin wrote that "The play is rich with the details of everyday life in a well-to-do Singaporeean Chinese family." The play was performed at the Commonwealth Arts Festival and the Edinburgh Fringe Festival in 1986. It has also been performed in Hong Kong, Australia, the United States and in Germany.

Kon's play, The Human Heart Fruit, was staged by Action Theatre in 2002 and starred Nora Samosir. Kon's first musical, Exodus, was written with the composer, Kenneth Lyen. Her second musical, Lost in Transit, was performed at The Arts House in 2005.
