= Emily of Emerald Hill =

Play by Stella Kon

Emily of Emerald Hill (Emily) is a play by Singaporean playwright Stella Kon. The play won the Singapore National Playwriting Competition in 1983.

== Premise ==
In 1929, fourteen-year-old Emily arrives at Oberon Mansion, the Gan family home located in the Peranakan enclave of Emerald Hill in Singapore. She is to be married to her cousin.

The play follows Emily in the bittersweet reflection of her life, through her roles as a conniving daughter-in-law, society hostess, meddling matriarch and finally a forlorn and lonely grandmother.

== Cultural significance ==
The play has been credited for giving expression to a distinctly Singaporean identity through its portrayal of Peranakan culture. In 2012, an exhibition titled Emily of Emerald Hill: Singaporean Identity on Stage ran at the Peranakan Museum.

== Composition ==
Emily of Emerald Hill was written over a period of three months in 1982, while Kon was living in Ipoh, Malaysia. It won the Ministry of Culture's Singapore National Playwriting Competition the following year. This was the third win for Stella Kon. Her previous two plays The Bridge and The Trial won in 1977 and 1982 respectively.

A monodrama, the play's popularity till today arguably stems in part from the inexpensiveness of its staging. Producers had regarded The Bridge and The Trial as unfeasible works due to their large casts (eighteen and twelve respectively).

== Productions ==
Emily of Emerald Hill premiered in Seremban, Malaysia with Malaysian playwright Leow Puay Tin starring. The following year, the play was performed at the 1985 Drama Festival in Singapore with Max Le Bond directing and starring actress Margaret Chan.

Other actors whom have played the titular Emily include Leow Puay Tin and Ivan Heng.

Singaporean theatre company W!LD RICE has staged the play multiple times since 2000. In a 2019 production, W!LD RICE founder, Heng, stars as Emily, with Glen Goei as director.

The play has also been translated into various languages.
