= Raffles Girls' School (Secondary) =

Location
- 2 Braddell Rise; Singapore 318871; Singapore; 1.3428°N 103.8434°E

Information
- Type: Independent
- Motto: Filiae Melioris Aevi (Daughters of a Better Age)
- Established: 1879; 147 years ago
- Sister school: Raffles Institution
- School code: 3008
- Chairman: Judith Prakash
- Principal: Mrs Ong Hong Peng
- Gender: Girls
- Enrolment: 1600
- Colour: Green Black White
- Website: www.rgs.edu.sg

Raffles Girls' School (RGS) is an independent girls' secondary school located in Braddell, Singapore. Established in 1879, it is one of the oldest schools in Singapore. RGS, together with its affiliated school Raffles Institution, offers a six-year Raffles Programme, which allows students to skip the Singapore-Cambridge GCE Ordinary Level examinations and proceed to take the Singapore-Cambridge GCE Advanced Level examinations at the end of Year 6.

The school was recognised by the Ministry of Education in 2006 by being awarded the School Excellence Award (recognising schools with 'exemplary school processes and practices'), among other awards.

It was a member of Alliance of Girls' Schools Australasia.

== History ==
Before RGS became a school in its own right, it existed as a section of Raffles Institution (RI).

The precursor to RGS opened in the RI campus of Bras Basah Road on 4 March 1844 with 11 students, five day-scholars and six boarders, who were clothed, fed and instructed by the RI management. The demand for education grew and in 1847, the school moved to RI's eastern wing, extending towards Bras Basah Road. Edmund Augustus Blundell, the Governor of the Straits Settlement, described the school as "a female school designed for the education and religious training of the children of poor Protestant parents" in 1855. In 1871, the school moved into a house, the George Family's Old Mansion at the corner of Bras Basah Road. In 1879, the school separated from RI and M. Nelson was appointed the school's first headmistress. Together with three assistants, she ran the school which had an enrolment of 77. Since then, 1879 has been officially regarded as the year of the founding of RGS.

On 21 October 2019, RGS moved from Anderson Road, where it had been located since 1959, to its new campus at Braddell Rise, located opposite RI.

== Uniform ==
The school's uniform is usually a deep blue boat-necked pinafore and a white collared blouse, which should not be confused with that of the Convent of the Holy Infant Jesus schools. For this reason, a tie/badge is also occasionally worn.

== Awards and accolades ==
A group of four students from RGS emerged Champion at the Kids' Lit Quiz 2018, and represented Singapore in New Zealand in July that year.

Joseph Toh Kim Leng won the Teaching Award in 2016, which honours outstanding teachers of English language, English literature and General Paper in Singapore.

Jodie Lai, a 2015 Optimist World Championships Under-15 champion, was conferred the title of Best Sportsgirl for sailing at the 46th Singapore Schools Sports Council (SSSC) Colours Awards in 2016.

Students from the school have won the Queen's Commonwealth Essay Competition.

== Notable alumnae ==
- Iris Koh, Singaporean anti-vaccination activist
- Annabel Chong, former pornographic actress
- Ang Swee Chai, orthopaedic surgeon and co-founder of Medical Aid for Palestinians
- Kit Chan, singer and actress
- Beatrice Chia, actress and director
- Chua Sock Koong, former SingTel group chief executive officer
- Joanna Dong, singer, actress and television host
- Faizah Jamal, legal academic and former nominated member of parliament
- Intan Azura Mokhtar, former member of parliament for Ang Mo Kio GRC
- Amy Khor, former member of parliament for Hong Kah North SMC
- Stella Kon, playwright best known for her play "Emily of Emerald Hill"
- Lee Choo Neo, first female medical practitioner in Singapore
- Jane Lee, first woman from Southeast Asia to scale the Seven Summits
- Lee Tzu Pheng, award-winning poet
- Lim Hwee Hua, first female Cabinet minister in Singapore
- Corrinne May, singer-songwriter
- Denise Phua, member of parliament for Jalan Besar GRC
- Judith Prakash, first female judge in the Court of Appeal
- Quah Ting Wen, national swimmer
- Rahayu Mahzam, Member of Parliament for Jurong East-Bukit Batok GRC
- Sim Ann, member of parliament for Holland-Bukit Timah GRC
- Siow Lee Chin, violinist
- Stefanie Sun, singer-songwriter
- Leaena Tambyah, founder of Singapore's first school for children with multiple disabilities
- Carrie Tan, former member of parliament for Nee Soon GRC
- Margaret Leng Tan, pianist
- Tan Pin Pin, film-maker
- Tang Pui Wah, Singapore's first female Olympian
- Tay Kewei, singer-songwriter and founder of Sparkle Life Music
- Jackie Yi-Ru Ying, nanotechnology scientist
- Emma Yong, actress
- Zhang Jingna, photographer and Forbes 30 Under 30 Asia honoree
- Mariam Jaafar, member of parliament for Sembawang GRC
