= Jean Tay =

Singaporean playwright (b. 1974)

- Born: 1974 (age 51–52)
- Occupation: Playwright
- Writing career
- Language: English

Jean Tay (born 1974) is a Singaporean playwright, best known for her plays Everything But the Brain and Boom. Her works have been performed in Singapore, the US, the UK and Italy. She is the artistic director and co-founder of Saga Seed Theatre.

== Biography ==
Tay is the daughter of an orthopaedic surgeon and a chemistry teacher. She studied at Singapore Chinese Girls' School, National Junior College from 1991 to 1992, and won a scholarship from the Monetary Authority of Singapore to attend Brown University in 1993. This was where she began practising creative writing under the tutelage of Nilo Cruz and Paula Vogel.

She earned early successes in fiction, winning the Golden Point Short Story Award for "Journey" in 1995 and the Weston Undergraduate Prize for Fiction for "The Story" in 1997. She ultimately graduated from Brown University in 1997 with a double degree in creative writing and economics, and spent seven years working as an economist at the Monetary Authority of Singapore.

In 2000, her short play The Knot won the first prize in Action Theatre's 10-Minute Play Competition and chosen as a finalist for the Actors Theatre of Louisville's 10-Minute Play Contest. In 2006, her play Everything But the Brain won Best Original Script at the Life! Theatre Awards. In 2007, she attended an International Playwriting Residency with the Royal Court Theatre in London, which was where she developed the play Boom. Both Everything But the Brain and Boom have been selected as Singapore Ministry of Education O-Level and N-Level literature texts.

She worked with the Singapore Repertory Theatre (SRT) as Resident Playwright from 2006 to 2009, also heading SRT's Young Company's Writing Programme in 2012.

In 2015, she co-founded Saga Seed Theatre, where she remains the artistic director. The company's roots lie in her belief that "new voices and stories need to be given a platform to be heard, and writers need a supportive environment to learn and grow."

== Literary career ==
Tay's earliest plays explored the subjugation of women under traditional Chinese patriarchy, as in the case of Water from the Well, which looks at female infanticide, and The Knot, which shows a woman escaping the bonds of marriage. Her later works consider family ties in broader terms, as in the case of Everything but the Brain deals with a woman whose physicist father is dying of a stroke, and Boom, in which a son attempts to persuade his mother to let her apartment to be demolished. A more recent interest involves the exploration of Singaporean history and myth, as seen in works such as Sisters – The Untold Stories of the Sisters Islands and Senang.

Tay has also delved into the world of musical theatre with works like The Admiral's Odyssey, Man of Letters and The Great Wall Musical: One Woman's Journey, as well as site-specific theatre, with Chinatown Crossings. She has also written and adapted stories for the stage for young audiences, including The Friendly Snake and The Story of Nian.

== Plays ==
- 1998: Water from the Well
- 1999: The Knot
- 2000: Hopper's Women (co-written with Cindy Koh)
- 2000: Plunge
- 2005: Everything but the Brain
- 2005: The Admiral's Odyssey
- 2006: Man of Letters
- 2008: Boom
- 2009: The Boy Who Cried Wolf
- 2010: Pinocchio The Musical
- 2013: Sisters – The Untold Stories of the Sisters Islands
- 2014: Senang
- 2014: IgnorLAND of its Time
- 2015: It Won't Be Too Long: The Cemetery (Dusk) / 在不久的将来之《坟场》
- 2016: The Shape of a Bird
- 2016: Skin Deep
- 2017: The Great Wall Musical: One Woman’s Journey
- 2017: Our Town
- 2018: Chinatown Crossings
- 2019: Smarty Pants and the Swordfish
- 2019: The Friendly Snake
- 2019: The Scourge of the Swordfish
- 2020: A Tiny Country
- 2020: The Story of Nian
- 2021: The Curious Case of the Missing Peranakan Treasure
- 2024: Pass.ages
- 2025: Karang Guni Boy
- 2025: Monstress – The reclaiming of Medea and Medusa (co-written with Claire Teo)

== Publications ==
- Boom (2009, Epigram Books) ISBN 9789810840174
- Everything but the Brain (2010, Epigram Books) ISBN 9789810855116
- Saint (2016, Ethos Books) ISBN 978-981-09-6095-7
- Sisters & Senang: The Island Plays (2018, Epigram Books) ISBN 9789814785907

== Collections ==
- "Plunge" in Southeast Asian Plays (2017, Supernova Books) ISBN 9781906582869
