= Everything but the Brain =

Everything but the Brain is a tragicomedy by Singaporean local writer Jean Tay. The work revolves around two main characters: Elaine Lim, a Science physics teacher, and her father Lim Chong Boon, a stroke-afflicted former professor. Originally developed at the Playwrights' Cove at The Necessary Stage in 2001, Everything but the Brain was first performed in 2005. The play won Best Original Script (for Tay) and Best Actor (for Gerald Chew as the father) at The Straits Times Life! Theatre Awards 2006 and was published by Epigram Books in 2010. In 2014, the play was selected by the Ministry of Education (Singapore) as a recommended 'O' and 'N' level literature text.

== Characters ==
- Elaine Lim: An unmarried, 36-year-old teacher specialising in Physics.
- Lim Chong Boon: A 66-year-old former professor in Physics and Elaine's father.
- Dr. Samuel Chen: A neurologist in his late twenties.
- Chorus A: A nameless bear who primarily narrates most of the play's events.
- Chorus B: A nameless bear and Chorus A's partner.
- Chorus C: A nameless bear and Chorus A's partner.

== Plot ==
A middle-aged Physics teacher attempts to reverse time using the Theory of Relativity in order to save her dying father.

== Performance history ==
Everything but the Brain was first performed in 2005 under the helm of Krishen Jit. In 2010, Samantha Scott-Blackhall revisited the play and in 2013, Derrick Chew directed the third remake of the play. Everything but the Brain was also staged in 2012 in London by the UCL Singapore Society and in Nottingham by the University of Nottingham's Singapore Society.

== See also ==
- Singaporean literature
