= Sebastian Sim =

Singaporean author

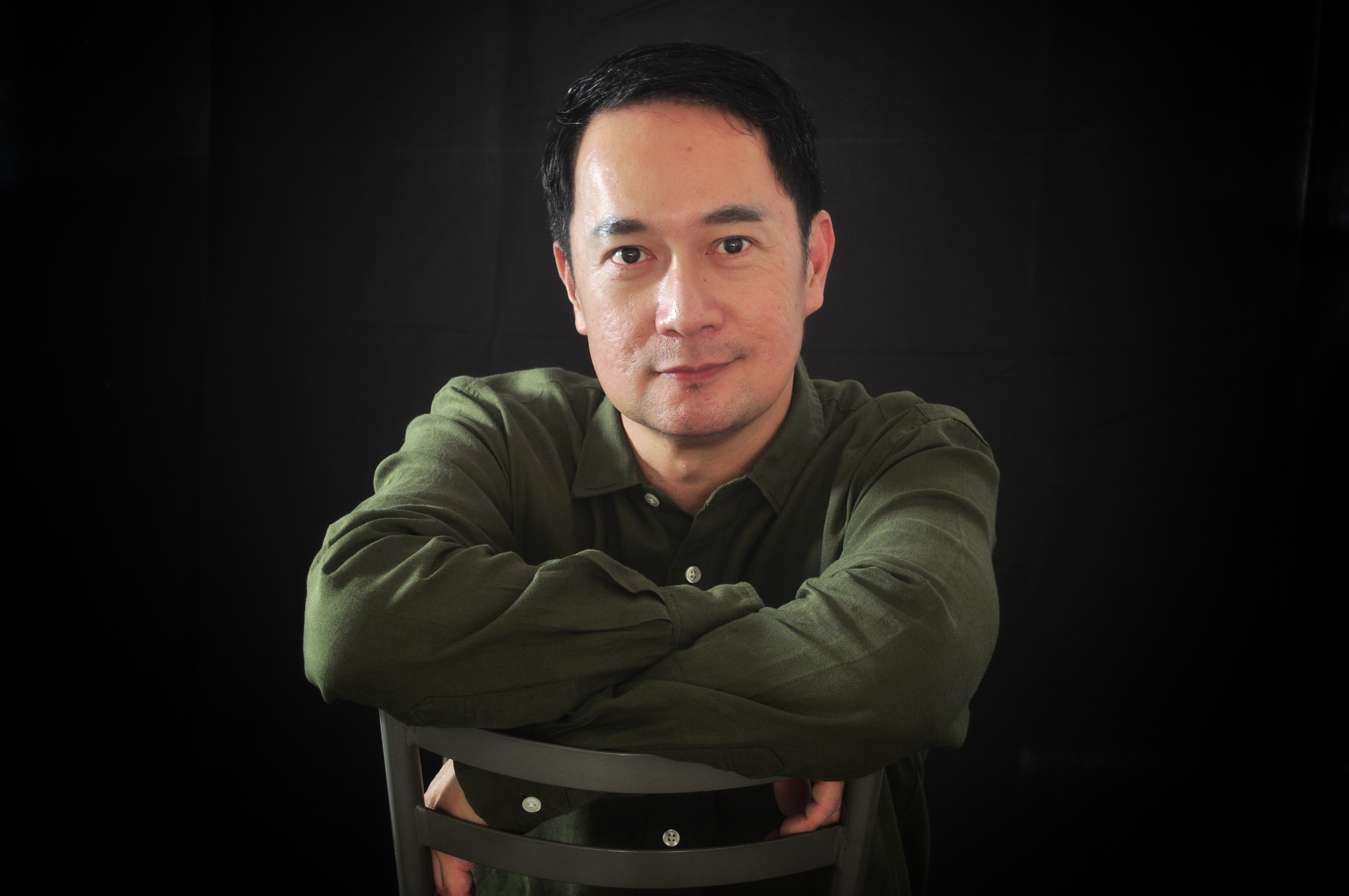
- Born: 2 October 1966 (age 59); Singapore
- Writing career
- Pen name: Yuè Guān Míng (岳观铭)
- Language: English, Chinese

Sebastian Sim (Chinese: 沈岳川; pinyin: Shěn Yuè Chuān; born 2 October 1966) is a Singaporean author, including of wuxia novels. He won the 2017 Epigram Books Fiction Prize for best original and unpublished novel in the English language written by a Singaporean citizen, Singapore permanent resident or Singapore-born writer for his novel, The Riot Act. In 2021, he won again in the same category for his novel And The Award Goes To Sally Bong!.

== Early life ==
Sim studied at Hwa Chong Junior College and was awarded the Public Service Commission scholarship. However, he gave up his scholarship before finishing his A-level exams.

== Career ==
Prior to being a writer, he took up a variety of occupations, including being a bartender, a prison officer in a maximum security prison, and a croupier in a casino.

=== Literary Activities ===
Sim first wrote wuxia (martial arts) novels in Chinese: his first series was The Heavenly Chef, written in 2004, and his second series, Tears of the Bat, was written in 2006. He wrote a third series in 2012. The novels were written under the pseudonym "Yuè Guān Míng" (岳观铭).

Let's Give It Up For Gimme Lao! was Sim's first English novel. It was a finalist for the 2015 Epigram Books Fiction Prize, shortlisted for the Popular Readers' Choice Awards 2016 - English (Adult) Books Category, and shortlisted for the Singapore Book Awards 2017 (Best Fiction Title). His second English novel, The Riot Act, won the 2017 Epigram Books Fiction Prize. His third novel, "And The Award Goes To Sally Bong!" won the 2021 edition of Epigram Books Fiction Prize, shared with Boey Meihan's The Formidable Miss Cassidy.

== Bibliography ==
- Sim, Sebastian (2016). Let's Give It Up for Gimme Lao!. Epigram Books. ISBN 978-981-4757-33-1.
- Sim, Sebastian (2018). The Riot Act. Epigram Books. ISBN 978-981-4785-74-7.
- Sim, Sebastian (2021). And The Award Goes to Sally Bong!. Epigram Books. ISBN 9789814901901.
