= Samantha Scott-Blackhall =

Singapore theatre director

Samantha Scott-Blackhall is a Singaporean theatre director. Her 2006 production of Quills won Best Production of the Year at the Life! Theatre Awards.

== Early life and education ==
Scott-Blackhall is the daughter of child psychologist Carol Balhetchet and the sister of designer Chelsea Scott-Blackhall. She studied at Flinders University in Adelaide, South Australia, and obtained her degree in drama and directing from the university in 2002.

== Career ==
In 2003, Scott-Blackhall directed the plays Popcorn, Agnes of God and The Deep Blue Sea. In the following year, she directed the plays Dead Certain, a psychological thriller, Harold Pinter's The Lover and The Dumb Waiter, and The Physicists. In 2005, she received three nominations for Best Director at the 2005 Life! Theatre Awards for The Physicists, The Lover and the Dumb Waiter and Dead Certain. She won Best Director for The Physicists. In 2005, she directed Modern Dance for Beginners.

In 2006, she directed the plays Doubt: A Parable, Death and the Maiden, Quills, The Car and 41 Hours. Quills won Best Production of the Year at the 2006 Life! Theatre Awards. In 2007, she directed an adaptation of the novel Lord of the Flies, as well as Everything but the Brain, Real Men, Fake Orgasms and Hitting (On) Women. In 2008, she directed the all-Eurasian play Mama's Wedding, as well as Apocalypse: Live! and Das Experiment: Black Box. In 2009, she directed the plays Manhood, Singapore Love Letters, The Vampire Monologues and Streetwalkers. In 2010, she directed the plays Ma Goes Home, Perfecting Prata and Behold Cravings.

In 2012, she directed an adaptation of Freud's Last Session. She was nominated for Best Director at the 2013 Life! Theatre Awards for her work on the play. In 2013, she directed the play 8 Women. In 2014, she directed the plays A Wedding, A Funeral & Lucky, the Fish and Stand Behind the Yellow Line – Garisan Kuning. In 2018, she directed the plays Red and Souvenir.

Scott-Blackhall has also taught at the LASALLE College of the Arts.
