= Nuraliah Norasid =

Author (b. 1986)

- Born: September 8, 1986 (age 39)
- Occupation: Writer
- Writing career
- Language: English

Nuraliah Norasid (born September 8, 1986) is a Singaporean author. She won the Epigram Books Fiction Prize for her first novel, The Gatekeeper, in 2016. She currently works as a research associate with the Centre for Research on Islamic and Malay Affairs, where she studies social marginalisation.

== Biography ==
Nuraliah grew up as the eldest of three children. Her parents brought her and her brothers up with a love of literature, ensuring that they spent an hour reading books every night. She also learned the skills of imaginative world-building from her passion for online games such as The Elder Scrolls. However, her childhood was also troubled, due to her family's poverty, and the fact that she was both a perpetrator and victim of bullying in school.

She eventually channelled her anger into writing, pursuing a PhD in English literature and creative writing at Nanyang Technological University, exploring how speculative fiction can be used to explore "issues such as marginality, isolation and socio-historical traumas facing the Malay community in Singapore". This work resulted in the manuscript of her first novel, The Gatekeeper.

Her other hobbies include taking walks and collecting stamps.

== Literary career ==
Nuraliah's first novel, The Gatekeeper, blends Greek mythology with contemporary Southeast Asian cultural elements. Set in the high-tech city of Manticura, it tells the story of a young medusa named Ria, who struggles to protect herself and her community of outcasts who have been marginalised by Human colonial settlers.

Her short stories and essays have been published in Quarterly Literary Review Singapore, Perempuan: Muslim Women in Singapore Speak Out, Eye/Feel/Write: Building Architectonics II and Best New Singaporean Short Stories: Volume Three.

== Novels ==
- The Gatekeeper (Epigram Books, 2017: ISBN 9789811700903)

== Awards ==
- Epigram Books Fiction Prize, 2016
- Most Promising Asian Woman Writer, 2018
- Shortlisted, Singapore Literature Prize, 2018
