= O Thiam Chin =

Singaporean author (born 1977)

- Born: 8 December 1977
- Occupation: Writer
- Writing career
- Language: English

O Thiam Chin (born 8 December 1977) is a Singaporean author. Many of his stories explore themes of love, heartbreak, alienation and gay male sexuality.

== Biography ==
O was born into a family of Mandarin-speaking hawkers. He studied at Ang Mo Kio Secondary School, and later pursued a diploma in mechatronics at Temasek Polytechnic. In 2000, he took up a part-time course in English language and literature at the Singapore Institute of Management. During this period, he started writing fiction.

He also began writing for magazines and online media, even writing and directing a short film. He became a full-time writer in 2005, and self-published his first collection, Free-Falling Man, in 2006. He has been featured three times on the longlist of the Frank O'Connor International Short Story Award: in 2010 for Never Been Better, in 2012 for The Rest of Your Life and Everything That Comes with It, and in 2014 for Love, or Something like Love, which was also shortlisted for the 2014 Singapore Literature Prize. His stories and writings have also been featured in numerous journals, such as Granta, The Cincinnati Review, The Brooklyn Rail, Asia Literary Review, Kyoto Journal, The Jakarta Post, Cha: An Asian Literary Journal, the Quarterly Literary Review Singapore, Karavan, and Asia Writes.

His debut novel, Now That It's Over, explores the heartbreak and trauma of two Singaporean couples, one gay and one straight, before and after the 2004 Indian Ocean tsunami. It was the winner of the inaugural Epigram Books Fiction Prize in 2015. His second novel, Fox Fire Girl, looks at a mysterious young woman and the self-destructive men who love her. It was shortlisted for the same award in 2016, and is currently being adapted into a feature film.

In 2023, he was one of three winners of the RisingStories Story Pitching Competition, for his script treatment for Boy and The Beast. He is part of the judging panel (Asian region) for the 2024 Commonwealth Short Story Competition.

O is an avid marathon runner.

== Short story collections ==
- Free-Falling Man (2006) ISBN 9780595384990
- Never Been Better (2009) ISBN 9789675997969
- Under The Sun (2010, MPH Group Publishing) ISBN 9789675997952
- The Rest Of Your Life and Everything That Comes With It (2011, ZI Publications) ISBN 9789675266232
- Love, Or Something Like Love (2013, Math Paper Press) ISBN 9789810776718
- Signs Of Life (2019, Math Paper Press) ISBN 9789811407963

== Novels ==
- Now That It's Over (2016, Epigram Books) ISBN 9789814757287
- Fox Fire Girl (2017, Epigram Books) ISBN 9789811700934
- The Dogs (2020, Penguin Random House SEA) ISBN 9789814882873
- We Are Not Alone Here (2022, Penguin Random House SEA) ISBN 9789815058062

== Awards ==
- Young Artist Award (Literary Arts), 2012
- Epigram Books Fiction Prize, 2015
