= June Wong =

Malaysian journalist

June Wong Har Leng
- Born: 29 June 1959 (age 67)
- Occupation: Journalist
- Known for: Group chief editor of The Star

June Wong Har Leng (born June 29, 1959) is a veteran Malaysian journalist and former group chief editor at top Malaysian daily The Star. Writing under the byline June H. L. Wong, she first joined the company as an intern in 1977 and as of 2026 is still writing fortnightly columns for the paper.

Along with the late Datuk Ng Poh Tip and National Journalism Laureate Adibah Amin, she was one of the first female editors to reach the top positions in Malaysian journalism.

Her popular column So Aunty, So What? was compiled into a best-selling book in 2019.

== Early life and education ==
She was born in George Town, Penang on June 29, 1959 to police officer Wong Heck Ming and housewife Mary Magdalene Wong Yoot Ho. One of five children, June grew up in Petaling Jaya where the family moved after her father was transferred to the Bukit Aman police headquarters in Kuala Lumpur.

Her father was a Special Branch officer who carried out undercover work in Labis and Segamat, Johor, specifically targeting communist threats during the Emergency. Her mother had worked as an interpreter in Johor during interrogations of captured communists, which is how the couple met. He eventually retired as an assistant commissioner of police.

Her siblings include actor/director Claire Wong, who is co-founder and Joint Artistic Director and Producer of the Singapore-based award-winning Checkpoint Theatre.

She attended Assunta Girls Secondary School, now SMK Assunta, and did her sixth form at nearby La Salle PJ. She then graduated with honours from the University of Malaya, majoring in English, in 1980. At her father's insistence, she went on to earn a post-graduate Diploma in Education from UM.

== Career ==
However, his hopes for her to become a teacher were dashed when Wong decided on a career in journalism that was whetted after she interned at The Star in 1977 while waiting for her A-level examination results. She joined the newspaper full time as a cadet reporter in 1982.

Her beats were politics, transport, housing, City Hall and parliament. On October 28, 1987, she was among the staff who found themselves out of work when The Star was shut down a day after Ops Lalang, an authoritarian crackdown under the regime of prime minister Mahathir Mohamad. A total of 106 individuals were detained under the Internal Security Act. Two other newspapers - Sin Chew Jit Poh and Watan - also had their operating licences revoked.

After almost 10 years as a news reporter, she moved to the features desk covering women, environment, social and human rights issues as well as lifestyle, travel, entertainment and fashion.

In 1991, she came up with The Great Malaysian Novel, a crowd-sourced book aimed at getting everyday citizens from all walks of life to co-author a single manuscript. Its goal was to celebrate the spirit of communal storytelling and reflect the diversity of the nation. With a basic plot and an opening chapter in place, a wooden book "cover" with ring binders holding empty pages was taken on a tour covering 12 cities and towns in all states (except for Perlis and Kelantan). People ranging from ordinary citizens to state politicians, royalty and even then Johor Mentri Besar Muhyiddin Yassin (who wrote an opening passage for Johor in 1992) contributed a paragraph or two.

In 1995, she ran a public poll of the Royal Malaysia Police with the support of PDRM PR department. The Star received more than 5,000 survey forms which showed a high degree of negativity and distrust towards the police. Despite ruffling some feathers the story was published.

From November 25 to December 10, 1998, Wong led her team of journalists to produce a 16-day series on Violence Against Women,covering a wide spectrum of issues on violence and discrimination against women to raise awareness, funding and recruit volunteers for the Women’s Aid Organisation (WAO).

The series made Malaysian media history and resulted in other NGOs from Bangladesh, Sri Lanka and Thailand asking for copies of the articles to pursue the same concept. WAO informed the United Nations Development Fund for Women (Unifem) about the special focus and Wong was able to personally deliver a complete set of the series to Unifem's office in New York.

Among the many people she interviewed were Malaysian leaders such as Hussein Onn, Mahathir Mohamad, Musa Hitam and Najib Abdul Razak.

She also did exclusives with foreign leaders such as Singaporean prime minister Lee Hsien Loong and Nobel Prize winner Muhammad Yunus. Wong also interviewed Hollywood stars Tom Hanks, Kevin Bacon, Cate Blanchett and Michelle Yeoh, and a range of other personalities from Carolina Herrera to Andre Agassi.

In 2011, she edited the archival coffee table book Hotshots: 40 Years of Great News Images, which depicted visual highlights of The Star's first 40 years.

Wong eventually rose to become The Star's Group Chief Editor in 2013. She was in that role when Malaysia was thrust in the global spotlight due to the disappearance of flight MH370 on March 8, 2014.

Later, she took over as Chief Operating Officer for Content Development.

Among the awards she won include the Women Editors Honours Award by the Women's Institute of Management, Malaysia in 2004 and the Golden Globe Tigers Award for Female Leadership in the journalism industry in Malaysia.

She is known for her column So Aunty, So What?, which first appeared on March 1, 2012, and which as of 2026, still appears fortnightly in The Star. Wong's March 29, 2012 article "From sexy to saggy" explains the inspiration for the column title that came to be associated with her.

She wrote on a wide range of topics ranging from family life, press freedom, domestic and international politics. These include her mixed feelings about Mahathir, a call for the severing of ties with North Korea, a critique of the cabinet of Muhyiddin Yassin, the trial of Rosmah Mansor, the death of activist Kamal Bamadhaj and the film adaptation of Tan Twan Eng's book The Garden Of Evening Mists.

Her column is among the most popular in the paper and has won praise from award-winning author Tan Twan Eng, Thomas Cup winner Tan Aik Huang, veteran activist Uma Sambanthan and former Bernama chairman Azman Ujang. Many of her columns were picked up by members of the Asian News Network in Singapore, India, Bangladesh, Vietnam, Myanmar and South Korea.

Upon her retirement from The Star in June 2019, the column was compiled into a book, which was launched by former deputy prime minister Musa Hitam.
