= Secondary: The Musical =

Singaporean play

Secondary: The Musical is a critically-acclaimed Singaporean musical written and composed by local singer-songwriter weish, and directed by Huzir Sulaiman, who also provided dramaturgy.

The musical chronicles the journey of a jaded, burnt-out literature teacher Lilin as she navigates a school year in the fictional Huxley Secondary School. The play touches on themes such as the pressures of Singapore's education system for both students and teachers alike, the myth of meritocracy, mental health, and inequality.

== Awards ==
The musical won Production of the Year at The Straits Times Life Theatre Awards 2025. It also earned six nominations at The Straits Times Life Theatre Awards 2025: Best Original Script for weish, Best Director for Huzir Sulaiman, Best Costume for Max Tan, and Best Supporting Actor and Actress for Teoh Junh Vinh and Rebekah Sangeetha Dorai.

== Plot ==
With potential of a promotion to the education ministry's headquarters, young teacher Lilin struggles to navigate one more school year while supporting her students. Secondary 3 students Ming, Omar, and Reyansh attempt to balance schoolwork and friendships amidst familial stresses.

== Performance history ==
Secondary: The Musical was first performed in 2024, staged by Checkpoint Theatre. The musical was also restaged in 2026 between 9 and 26 April, under the same theatre company, in which some actors reprised their roles.

== See also ==
- Singapore literature
