= Ivan Heng =

Singaporean actor and theatre director (born 1963)

- 王爱仁
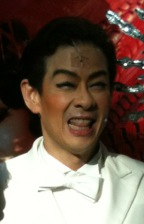
- Heng at the Esplanade Theatre in July 2012
- Born: 20 September 1963 (age 62); Singapore, Malaysia
- Education: Anglo-Chinese School; Temasek Junior College; National University of Singapore; Royal Conservatoire of Scotland
- Occupations: Actor, theatre director
- Spouse: Tony Trickett (m. 2014)
- Parent: Nancy Ong (mother)
- Relatives: Tan Kheng Hua
- Awards: Cultural Medallion (2013)

Chinese name
- Traditional Chinese: 王愛仁
- Simplified Chinese: 王爱仁
Transcriptions
Standard Mandarin
- Hanyu Pinyin: Wáng Àirén
- Website: www.wildrice.com.sg

Ivan Heng Ai Jin (Note: Chinese: 王爱仁, Peng'im: Hêng^{5} Ai^{3} Ring^{5}) (born 20 September 1963) is a Singaporean actor and theatre director of Peranakan descent. He is the founding artistic director of W!LD RICE, a theatre company in Singapore, and an outspoken advocate for respect for diversity and freedom of expression.

Heng is the first male Singaporean actor to break into English-speaking roles in Hollywood films with his role in Luc Besson's The Fifth Element.

== Biography ==
A theatre director, actor, playwright and designer, Heng's productions are concerned with identity, migration and gender and sexual politics within intercultural contexts. They have played festivals and theatres in more than 20 cities around the world including Melbourne International Arts Festival, New Zealand International Arts Festival, Edinburgh Fringe, ICA International Festival of the Chinese Diaspora (London), Hong Kong City Festival, Royal Tropical Institute (Netherlands), SIETAR Congress (Munich), WOTM Conference (Belgium) and Re:Map Festival (Copenhagen).

Heng's background is in both Asian and Western theatre traditions: training as a director with Kuo Pao Kun of Practice Performing Arts in Singapore; ballet, jazz and contemporary dance as a scholar with Dance Arts Singapore; and training with the Peking Opera in Hong Kong (Hong Kong Tang's Opera Troupe) and Singapore (Leling Peking Opera Troupe, Chinese Theatre Circle). He also spent a summer at the British American Drama Academy in Oxford. His mentor, colleague and closest collaborator was Krishen Jit with whom he collaborated on M. Butterfly, The Coffin is too Big for the Hole, No Parking on Odd Days, Emily of Emerald Hill and The Visit of the Tai tai.

=== Early years ===
Heng was educated at Anglo-Chinese School, Temasek Junior College and the National University of Singapore, where he studied law from 1984 to 1988.He was admitted to practice as a lawyer until the acting bug led him to various theatres, winning many awards in Edinburgh, London, Canada and finally Hollywood. Heng was awarded the Cultural Medallion, Singapore's highest arts honour, in 2013.

Whilst studying for his law degree, Heng attended Kuo's directing workshop, acted with Singapore Theatre American Repertory Showcase (S*TARS), and directed and designed sets as a founding member of The Necessary Stage.

Heng originated the lead role of Malcolm Png in Michael Chiang's Army Daze in 1987. He also played Frankie Wong in Beauty World, and Song Liling in the All-Asian premiere of M. Butterfly in India in 1989 (a role originated on the West End by his future collaborator Glen Goei). Heng also performed in M. Butterfly at the Singapore Arts Festival in 1990.

=== Overseas work ===
In 1990, Heng became the first recipient of the BAT Arts Scholarship to the Royal Scottish Academy of Music and Drama, now the Royal Conservatoire of Scotland, in Glasgow. He graduated with top honours, including the Royal Lyceum Theatre Award for Best Shakespearean Performance (Richard III), the Margaret Gordon Award for Best Final Year Performance, and the Dorothy Innes Prize for Best Studentship. In 2024, he received an honorary doctorate from the institution.

Heng made his UK directorial debut at the Edinburgh Fringe Festival with a Singaporean play – Ovidia Yu's The Woman in a Tree on the Hill. The production won the Scotsman Edinburgh Fringe First (Singapore's first and only), as well the Scottish Daily Express New Names of '93 Award. Thereafter, he moved to London where he worked in film, television and radio, and founded the Tripitaka Theatre Company to do touring productions with an Asian point of view, like his autobiographical solo Journey West (1995).

=== Return to Singapore ===
In 1998, after touring extensively throughout Europe, Heng decided to return to Singapore to contribute and make a difference to Singapore's nascent arts scene.

In 2000, Heng founded W!LD RICE. His projects for the company include directing The Campaign to Confer the Public Service Star on JBJ, Second Link – The Singapore Malaysia Text Exchange, Oi! Sleeping Beauty!!, The Visit of the Tai Tai, Landmarks – Asian Boys Vol.2, Cinderel-lah!, Animal Farm, Ang Tau Mui, The Woman in A Tree on the Hill, An Occasional Orchid; set designing The Magic Fundoshi, Boeing Boeing, Landmarks, Ang Tau Mui, Animal Farm, An Occasional Orchid, and Kuo Pao Kun's The Coffin is too Big for the Hole and No Parking on Odd Days; and acting in The Visit of the Tai Tai, For the Pleasure of Seeing Her Again, Emily of Emerald Hill, Animal Farm, La Cage Aux Folles and The Importance of Being Earnest.

Other highlights of his career include acting in Army Daze, Beauty World (both original casts) and M. Butterfly (India, Canada, Singapore); conceiving and directing Ah Kong's Birthday Party (Singapore's longest-running play); directing Dim Sum Dollies Steaming! and Singapore's Most Wanted (Esplanade Theatre), Phua Chu Kang: the Musical for the president of Singapore's Star Charity, Puccini's Madama Butterfly for the Singapore Lyric Opera (Esplanade Theatre), and co-directing and performing in Hotel Grand Asia, a three-year intercultural collaboration involving 16 theatre artists from seven cities at the Setagaya Public Theatre in Tokyo.

In 2006, Heng was artistic director of the inaugural Singapore Theatre Festival, which was presented by W!LD RICE and featured nine productions by five theatre companies, including five world premieres, seminars and workshops. In 2009, he served as creative director for Singapore's National Day Parade. In 2010, he was creative director for the opening and closing ceremonies of the inaugural Youth Olympic Games held in Singapore.

Heng's awards for excellence in theatre include the Edinburgh Fringe First, Scottish Daily Express New Names of '93 Award, Edinburgh Spirit of the Fringe 1995, Singapore Young Artist Award 1996, the Singapore Youth Award 1998, the Straits Times Life! Theatre Award for Best Director 2002, the Singapore Tatler Leadership Award for Culture (2006) and the Cultural Medallion in 2013.

He shares his practice by giving workshops internationally, and has taught at the Central School of Speech and Drama (London), Tramway (Glasgow), Intercult (Stockholm), Kannonhallen (Denmark), Dramalab (Kuala Lumpur, Malaysia), and Lasalle College of the Arts in Singapore. He was also a participant at London's Royal Court Theatre 10th International Summer Residency.

== Personal life ==
In August 2014, Heng married his long-time partner Tony Trickett in London. Heng met Trickett, now the executive director of W!LD RICE, in 1996.

== Filmography ==
=== Films ===
- 2013: Sex.Violence.FamilyValues – Pole Dance Judge
- 1999: Rogue Trader – Singapore Bartender
- 1997: The Fifth Element (Le Cinquième élément) – Left Arm

=== Plays ===
- 2015: Public Enemy – Dr. Thomas Chee
- 2013: The Importance of Being Earnest – Lady Bracknell
- 2012: La Cage Aux Folles – Albin
- 2011: Emily of Emerald Hill – Emily
- 2011: The Weight of Silk on Skin – John Au Yong
- 2006: Jack and the Beansprout – Widow Neo
- 2004: For the Pleasure of Seeing You Again – Narrator
- 2002: Emily of Emerald Hill – Emily
- 2000: Emily of Emerald Hill – Emily
- 1999: Emily of Emerald Hill – Emily
