= Kenneth Lyen =

Kenneth Lyen is a Singaporean pediatrician, visiting consultant pediatric endocrinologist and a visiting tutor in developmental pediatrics.

Lyen is also part of the management board for the Rainbow Centre which manages two of the schools he founded which were built for children with disabilities and autism spectrum disorder. He also received the Public Service Medal for his community services. He has published 22 original research papers, co-authored 13 books and written 22 musicals which were staged in Singapore.

== Biography ==
Lyen graduated from the University of Oxford in 1973, trained in pediatrics at the Great Ormond Street Hospital (1978-1980), and was a research fellow at the Children's Hospital of Philadelphia (1980-1983). He became a consultant pediatrician at the National University Hospital Singapore (1983-1989). During this time he was invited by Victor Seah to serve on the committee now known as the Movement for the Intellectually Disabled of Singapore (MINDS).

Lyen was part of the team that investigated mass poisoning in Perak, Malaysia in 1991, did an anthropometric study of Singapore School children in 1991 and pubertal development in 1995. He was the founding president of two schools for disabled and autism spectrum disorder children, the Margaret Drive (1987) and the Balestier (1992) Special Schools.

Lyen is fluent in English, Mandarin Chinese, and the Cantonese dialect.

Lyen is a consultant pediatrician at Mt. Elizabeth Medical Centre. He is a consulting pediatric endocrinologist at Singapore General Hospital's School Health Services. He is also a visiting tutor at the Yong Loo Lin School of Medicine. Children's Hospital in Philadelphia, Pennsylvania (United States) awarded him a research fellowship in pediatric diabetes and metabolic diseases. He sits on numerous advisory boards and medical panels, and he teaches at the National University of Singapore.

During the global COVID-19 pandemic, he authored and self-published COVID-19 in Singapore, a research paper discussing how the pandemic affected the lives of people in Singapore during the first half of 2020. He also responded to an open letter and debunked the anti-Covid-vaccine claims made by 12 other doctors. He used his pediatric expertise to assure the public that the vaccines are safe for children.

In 2022. Lyen was awarded the Bintang Bakti Masyarakat (Public Service Star).

== Publications ==
Lyen has co-authored and co-edited several books including Asian Child Care and Rainbow Dreams. In addition, he has written and staged 20 musicals in Singapore, including:

- Big Bang! (1995): based on the life of cosmologist Stephen Hawking
- Orchard Square (1996): four teenagers work out their personal problems
- Catch the Rainbow (1997): the history of Singapore
- Yum Sing! (1999): wedding flashback of how a bride and bridegroom met
- Temptations (2000): cross-dressed TV cook show presenter falls for a girl
- Magic Paintbrush (2001): an ancient Chinese folk tale
- Song of the Whale (2002): the biblical story of Jonah and the whale
- Sayang (2002): radio talk show host and his fan, a lonely florist
- Exodus (2003): story of Moses
- Making The Grade (2004): schoolmistress and her problem students
- Blue Willow House (2006): Lim Boon Keng and prostitutes in Singapore at the end of the 19th century
- School House Rockz (2008): TV series musical about teenagers and their school problems
- Monkey (2009): puppet musical of an episode from Monkey: Journey to the West
- It's Academic! (2011) love triangle among teenagers
