= W!LD RICE =

Theatre company in Singapore

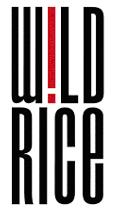
- Logo of W!LD RICE
- Founded: 2000; 26 years ago in Singapore
- Founder: Ivan Heng
- Headquarters: 107 North Bridge Road, #04-08, Funan, Singapore, Singapore
- Key people: Janice Koh; Alfian Sa'at; Glen Goei
- Owner: Ivan Heng
- Website: www.wildrice.com.sg

Wild Rice (stylized W!LD RICE), founded in 2000 by Ivan Heng, is a professional theatre company in Singapore. In 2019, the company established a permanent performance venue at Funan Mall.

== History ==
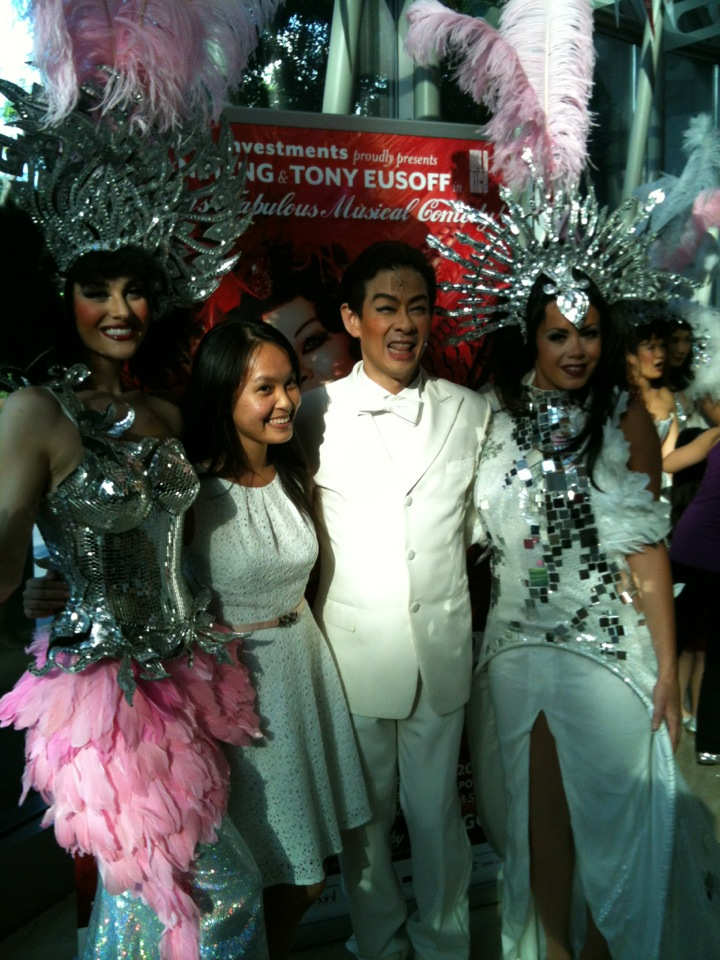
Ivan Heng after a W!LD RICE performance of La Cage (based on La Cage aux Folles) at the Esplanade – Theatres on the Bay, Singapore, on 29 July 2012

The first show by Wild Rice was held at Jubilee Hall in Raffles Hotel. Since then, the company has operated out of a studio space in Little India. Productions have been held in rented venues such as the Victoria Theatre.

In 2017, Wild Rice kickstarted the process to acquire a permanent venue to hold productions, after seven failed attempts. The permanent venue would contain a theatre within the new Funan Mall and would cost S$15 million. The construction was funded through a fundraising strategy that included calls for donations, a gala dinner, and founding patrons. The 20,000 sq ft (1,900 m^{2}) venue spans across three levels and comprises a 60-seat performance studio, rehearsal rooms, Wild Rice’s office, and its 358-seat Ngee Ann Kongsi Theatre. The theatre features Singapore's only thrust stage, where the performance space is in the middle of the auditorium with the audience seated on three sides, based on the Royal Shakespeare Company’s Swan Theatre in Stratford-Upon-Avon, England. It has a stage and seating configuration that allows for minimum usage of microphones. The theatre was officially opened on 8 August 2019 with Thomas Lim’s Supervision, with a grand opening season of four productions between 4 September to 22 December.

== List of performances ==
- 2000: Emily of Emerald Hill
- 2000: An Occasional Orchid
- 2001: The Coffin is Too Big for the Hole & No Parking on Odd Days; An Occasional Orchid; The Woman in a Tree on the Hill; Emily of Emerald Hill; Blithe Spirit
- 2002: Emily of Emerald Hill; Animal Farm; Ang Tau Mui; Boeing Boeing; Rice Ball 2002: Starry Starry Night
- 2003: The Eleanor Wong Trilogy: Invitation to Treat; Rice Ball 2003: Red, White and W!ld; Animal Farm; Cinderel-lah!
- 2004: Landmarks: Asian Boys Vol. 2; Animal Farm; Rice Ball 2004: Double Happiness; For the Pleasure of Seeing Her Again; The Visit of the Tai Tai; Aladdin
- 2005: Boeing Boeing; Rice Ball 2005: Kampong Glam; Second Link: The Singapore-Malaysia Text Exchange; Oi! Sleeping Beauty!!
- 2006: Connect the Dots; The Magic Fundoshi; Rice Ball 2006: Some Enchanted Evening; Homesick; The Silence of the Kittens; By the Way; The Campaign to Confer the Public Service Star on JBJ; National History Class/Utama: Every Name in History is I; Salsa! Salsa! Salsa!; Sing Your Way Home; Second Link; Jack & the Bean-sprout!
- 2007: Blithe Spirit; Rice Ball 2007: Singapore A-go-go!; On Diversion Road (by young & W!LD); Happy Endings: Asian Boys Vol. 3; The Campaign to Confer the Public Service Star on JBJ; Mad Forest (by young & W!LD)
- 2008: Beauty World; The Hypochondriac (by young & W!LD); The Swordfish, then the Concubine; Angel-ism; Tree/House; The Last Temptation of Stamford Raffles; I am Queen; Apocalypse: LIVE!; Own Time Own Target; Blood Binds; Rice Ball 2008: Disco Rice Ball; Snow White & the Seven Dwarfs
- 2009: The Importance of Being Earnest; Own Time Own Target; Rice Ball 2009: The Big Hair Ball; Beauty & the Beast
- 2010: Animal Farm; Family (by young & W!LD); Boeing Boeing; Unlike Some People (by young & W!LD); Rice Ball 2010: The Red Hot Chilli Padi Ball; Cinderel-lah!
- 2011: Swordfish+Concubine: The Fall of Singapura (by young & W!LD); Emily of Emerald Hill; Animal Farm; The Weight of Silk on Skin; Charged; Cooling-off Day; Family Outing; Nadirah; Rice Ball 2011: People’s Acting Party!; Aladdin
- 2012: Cooling-off Day; Romeo & Juliet; La Cage Aux Folles; Rice Ball 2012: Diamonds are Forever; Hansel and Gretel
- 2013: The Importance of Being Earnest; Cook a Pot of Curry; Dreamplay: Asian Boys Vol. 1; The Optic Trilogy; Rice Ball 2013: The (Very) Royal Ball; Jack & the Bean-sprout!
- 2014: The House of Bernarda Alba; The Importance of Being Earnest; Little Riots and Other Stories (by young & W!LD); Rice Ball 2014: Night Safari; Monkey Goes West
- 2015: Public Enemy; Geylang (by young & W!LD); Another Country; Hotel; The Importance of Being Earnest; A Midsummer Night’s Dream (by young & W!LD); Rice Ball 2015: Swinging Sexy Singapura!; The Emperor’s New Clothes
- 2016: When S#!t Hits the Fam (by young & W!LD); Hotel; Geylang; Riders Know When It’s Gonna Rain; Hawa; Let’s Get Back Together; Grandmother Tongue; GRC (Geng Rebut Cabinet); My Mother Buys Condoms; Rice Ball 2016: XXX – The Very W!LD Rice Ball; Monkey Goes West
- 2017: Crossings (by young & W!LD); La Cage Aux Folles; The Bald Soprano (by young & W!LD); Boeing Boeing; Rice Ball 2017: Once Upon A Time; Grandmother Tongue; Mama White Snake
- 2018: Supervision; Press Gang; Building A Character; G.F.E.; 招: When The Cold Wind Blows; An Actress Prepares; Faghag; One Metro Square: Voices From Sungei Road; Rice Ball 2018: Out Of This World; A $ingapore Carol
- 2019: Anything Can Happen/Something Must Happen; Supervision; Emily Of Emerald Hill; Rice Ball 2019: Making History; Merdeka; Fair Play; Peter Pan In Serangoon Gardens
- 2020: The Importance Of Being Earnest; The Pitch; Rice Ball 2020: MASKquerade; An Actress Prepares; #FeelingsToTheMax - PSLE Edition; Mine; Cafe; Candide; Schooled
- 2021: Bull; Grandmother Tongue; Where Are You? (Singapore); The Amazing Celestial Race; #FeelingsToTheMax - A New Friend; The Other F Word; Agathi Refugee; You Are Here; SIFA 2021 - The Commission; Faghag; Love & Information; Straight Acting; Don't Call Him Mr Mari Kita; Momotaro & The Magnificent Peach
- 2022: The Good Citizen; The Amazing Celestial Race; Schooled; Tartuffe: The Imposter; Faghag; Straight Acting; Don't Call Him Mr Mari Kita; Animal Farm; Pulau Ujong/Island At The End; The Butterfly Lovers; Pinochio
- 2023: Rice Ball 2023: The Legendary Ball; An Inspector Calls; The Butterfly Lovers; The Wonderful World Of Dissocia; Hotel; Every Student Is A Good Student / In My Head; Psychobitch; The Velveteen Rabbit; G*d Is A Woman; Fair Play
