= Epigram Books =

Singaporean publishing house

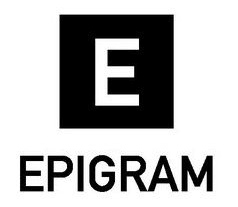
- Industry: Publishing (and Design)
- Founded: 1991
- Headquarters: Singapore
- Products: Literary Fiction and Non-fiction
- Website: Epigram Books

Epigram Books is an independent publishing company in Singapore. It publishes works of Singapore-based writers, poets and playwrights.

== History ==
Epigram was founded in 1991 by Edmund Wee as a design agency. Epigram began the publishing and designing of annual reports before expanding its portfolio to include more diverse design work such as wayfinding, corporate logo branding, and graphic design. Notable clients of Epigram include OCBC Bank, Singapore Airlines, Media Development Authority and CapitaLand.

Epigram has won international awards for their designs of annual reports, including the Hong Kong Design Awards and the Graphis Gold Award for Annual Reports. They are the first company in the world to win the Grand Prix award at the Red Dot consecutively. They received commissions for commemorative books from agencies such as the National Trades Union Congress and the Ministry of Foreign Affairs.

The company Epigram Books, the publishing arm of Epigram set up in 1999, published its first book with mountaineer David Lim’s Mountain to Climb: The Quest for Everest and Beyond. Epigram Books bore the design and printing costs of the book and sold five thousand copies. Epigram Books was incorporated as a separate entity from the parent company in July 2011.

In 2015, Epigram Books launched a fiction prize, the Epigram Books Fiction Prize, with an award of $20,000. The first edition was won by O Thiam Chin.

In January 2021, Epigram Books, which set up its London arm in November 2016, announced it would stop publishing in the United Kingdom in order to shore up its Singapore business amid the COVID-19 slowdown.

== Notable publications and reception ==
Epigram Books has published a series of cookbooks, under the Heritage Cookbook series. In 2010, it published There’s No Carrot in Carrot Cake, a guide book to Singapore’s street food (or hawker food in colloquial terms). The book sparked a debate in the media about the need for a culinary school to preserve Singapore’s food heritage.

A short story, Moving Forward, included in the compilation of Andrew Tan's Monsters, Miracles & Mayonnaise was nominated for an Eisner Award for Best Short Story in 2013. Monsters, Miracles & Mayonnaise is one of the three graphic novels that was published by the company in 2012. Epigram Books is also the first Singaporean publishing house to have a comic book nominated for this prize. Another graphic novel, Ten Sticks and One Rice by Oh Yong Hwee and Koh Hong Teng won an International MANGA Award (Bronze) in 2014.

Other than publishing books by debut authors, Epigram Books has also taken to republish books that are out-of-print Singapore classics, such as Jean Tay’s Boom and Everything but the Brain and Goh Poh Seng’s The Immolation. The company has also launched the Cultural Medallion series, where non-English literature award recipients are translated into English. Some of the works include Singai M. Elangkannan’s Flowers at Dawn, Suratman Markasan’s Penghulu and Wong Meng Voon’s Under the Bed, Confusion.

In 2016, Epigram Books was shortlisted for the Bologna Prize for the Best Children's Publishers of the Year at the 53rd Bologna Children's Book Fair. The award rewards creative, innovative publishers based on “The editorial projects, professional skills and intellectual qualities of work produced by publishing houses all over the world”. In the same year, Epigram Books won four out of eight prizes at the Singapore Book Awards, including Book Of The Year for Sonny Liew's The Art of Charlie Chan Hock Chye and Best Fiction Title for Amanda Lee Koe's Ministry of Moral Panic.

== Epigram Books Fiction Prize ==
Launched in 2015, the Epigram Books Fiction Prize has been awarded annually to the best original and unpublished novel in the English language written by a Singaporean citizen, Singapore permanent resident, or Singapore-born writer. Until 2023, the prize was Singapore's richest literary prize, with the highest prize being $25,000 SGD, before being surpassed by the Dr Alan HJ Chan Spirit of Singapore Book Prize.

The inaugural 2015 Prize was won by O Thiam Chin for his novel Now That It's Over, while the 2016 Prize was won by Nuraliah Norasid for her novel The Gatekeeper and the 2017 Prize to Sebastian Sim for The Riot Act. In 2018, Yeoh Jo-Ann's Impractical Uses Of Cake won, and it was announced that from 2019, the Prize prize will be open to writers from other ASEAN countries, not only Singapore.

In 2020, Malaysian author Joshua Kam won, with his book, How the Man in Green Saved Pahang, and Possibly the World.

In January 2021, two writers – Meihan Boey and Sebastian Sim – were named joint winners of the 2021 Prize. This is the first time two joint winners have won the Prize and the first time an author, Sebastian Sim, has won it twice.

The Prize was not awarded in 2024 as Epigram Books redirected resources towards children’s books, but resumed in 2025.

From 2026, shortlisted books will also be published in Malaysia, Indonesia, Thailand, the Philippines, and Myanmar.

=== Winners ===
Year	Title	Author	Ref
2015	Now That It's Over	O Thiam Chin	
2016	The Gatekeeper	Nuraliah Norasid	
2017	The Riot Act	Sebastian Sim	
2018	Impractical Uses of Cake	Yeoh Jo-Ann	
2020	How The Man In Green Saved Pahang, And Possibly The World	Joshua Kam	
2021 (Note: Joint winners)	The Formidable Miss Cassidy	Meihan Boey	
2021	And The Award Goes to Sally Bong	Sebastian Sim	
2022	The Accidental Malay	Karina Robles Bahrin	
2023	The Campbell Gardens Ladies’ Swimming Class	Vrushali Junnarkar	
2025	The Mystical Mister Kay	Meihan Boey	
2026	Mind The Gap	Ratna Damayanti Taha	
