= Glen Goei =

Singaporean theatre director

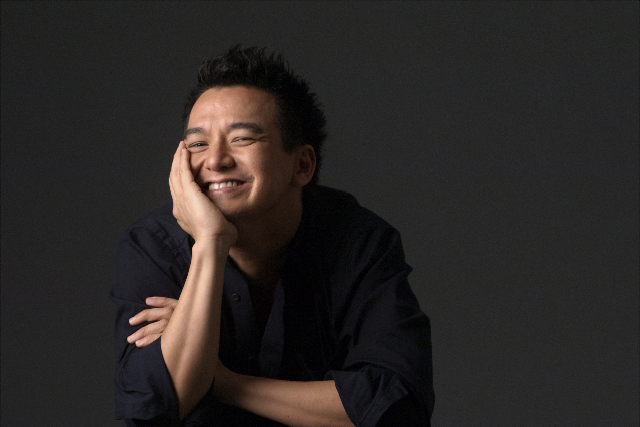
- Glen Goei
- Born: 22 December 1962 (age 63); Colony of Singapore
- Occupations: Producer, director
- Years active: 1989-present

Chinese name
- Traditional Chinese: 魏銘耀
- Simplified Chinese: 魏铭耀
Transcriptions
Standard Mandarin
- Hanyu Pinyin: Wèi Míng Yào

Glen Goei (simplified Chinese: 魏铭耀; traditional Chinese: 魏銘耀; pinyin: Wèi Míng Yào; born 22 December 1962) is a theatre and film director from Singapore. His body of work includes film, theatre, musicals, large scale shows, World Expos, dance, music, and architectural design.

Glen Goei was the artistic director of Mu-Lan Arts in London from 1990 to 1998. It was the first Asian theatre company to be established in the United Kingdom. He is currently the Associate Artistic Director of the Singaporean theatre company, W!LD RICE.

Goei's film Forever Fever was the first Singapore film to achieve a worldwide commercial release. The film was distributed in America and the UK by Miramax, which then signed him on an exclusive three-picture deal.

In 1994, he received the National Youth Award for his contribution to the arts from Prime Minister Goh Chok Tong.

== Early life ==
Born on 22 December 1962 and the youngest of seven children, Goei attended the Anglo Chinese School in Singapore from 1969 to 1980, then Jesus College, Cambridge University, in the UK from 1983 to 1986, where he earned his B.A. Honors, M.A. in history. He spent the next two years at Mountview Academy of Theatre Arts, receiving a Postgraduate Diploma in Drama, and later studied filmmaking at New York University (1994-1995).

== Career ==
Goei's professional career started with his Olivier Award-nominated performance in the title role of M. Butterfly opposite Anthony Hopkins in London's West End. It grew through his multi-award-winning tenure as Producer and artistic director of Mu-Lan Arts in London - the first Asian theatre company to be established in the United Kingdom. Mu-Lan's productions, like The Magic Fundoshi, garnered acclaim in London, Singapore and worldwide - including awards for Best Original Play, Best Production and Best Comedy at the Sunday Times Fringe Awards.

In 1998, Goei's film career began with his first feature Forever Fever (a.k.a. That's The Way I Like It), which he wrote, produced and directed. The film was produced under his production company, TigerTiger Productions. It was the first Singapore film to achieve a worldwide commercial release after being picked up by Miramax for distribution in America and the UK. Following its success, Miramax signed him on an exclusive three-picture deal.

His second film The Blue Mansion had its commercial release in October 2009. It was shown at the Pusan and the Tokyo International Film Festivals. Filmed at the historic Cheong Fatt Tze Mansion in Penang, the murder-mystery revolves around a wealthy man who dies suddenly and returns as a ghost to uncover the circumstances surrounding his death.

In 2013, Goei announced that acclaimed cinematographer Christopher Doyle would be shooting his third film, Yellow Flowers, a.k.a. The Hangman’s Breakfast. Written by playwright Haresh Sharma, the film touches upon Singapore's death penalty, telling the story of a single mother Eleanor on death row for unknowingly smuggling drugs, her rebellious only child who refuses to visit her, Eleanor's young lawyer Nadya who also has issues with her own mother, and the prison's reluctant executioner Gopal, who develops a friendship with Eleanor.

In 2014, Goei wrote his first book for children, Little Red in the Hood, which transplanted the traditional fairy tale to a Singapore setting. Published by Epigram Books, the children's picture book was illustrated by Drewscape, and a part of its proceeds went to charity.

In 2015, Goei's film project, Revenge of the Pontianak, was selected to be one of the 10 films to be part of the Berlinale Talent Project Market at the Berlin International Film Festival. Revenge of the Pontianak pays homage to the popular Malay horror films produced by the Shaw and Cathay studios in Singapore back in the 1950s and is produced by Tan Bee Thiam. Filming began in Malaysia in 2018, with Gavin Yap joining the production as co-director. Revenge of the Pontianak is set to have its theatrical release in August 2019.

Goei has also contributed to Singapore theatre, including serving as Associate Artistic Director of the company W!LD RICE and working as a director for Dream Academy. His productions for W!LD RICE have included such as Boeing Boeing, The Magic Fundoshi, Blithe Spirit, Emily of Emerald Hill, La Cage aux Folles and his internationally lauded interpretation of The Importance of Being Earnest. Goei's work with Dream Academy includes productions such as The Revenge of The Dim Sum Dollies, Dim Sum Dollies - The History of Singapore Part 1 and 2, The Little Shop of Horrors and Into The Woods.

== Personal life ==
Goei is openly gay. He lives in Singapore with his partner and is an advocate for LGBT+ rights. He was a key figure behind the Ready4Repeal campaign, a petition that urged the Government of Singapore to repeal Section 377A of the Penal Code, which criminalised sex between mutually consenting adult men.

== Works ==
=== Theatre ===
- M. Butterfly, West End, London, 1989 - Actor
- Madame Mao's Memories, London 1991 and tour 1993 - Producer and director
- Porcelain, Royal Court Theatre, London 1992 - Producer and director
- The Magic Fundoshi, Hammersmith Theatre, London 1993 and tour 1994, 1996 - Producer and director,
- Three Japanese Women, Soho Theatre, London, 1993 - Producer and director
- Into The Woods, Singapore, 1994 - Director
- Kampong Amber, Singapore, 1994 - Actor & director
- Land of a Thousand Dreams, Singapore, 1995 - Director
- Boeing Boeing, Singapore, 1995 - Director
- Godspell, Anglo-Chinese School, Singapore, 2001 - Director
- Blithe Spirit, Singapore, 2001 - Director
- Boeing Boeing (New Production) Singapore, 2002, 2005 - Director
- Revenge of the Dim Sum Dollies, Singapore, 2004 - Director
- Aladdin, Singapore, 2004 - Director
- The Magic Fundoshi (New Production), Singapore, 2006 - Director
- Little Shop of Horrors, Singapore, 2006 - Director
- Blithe Spirit, Singapore, 2007 - Director
- The Dim Sum Dollies - The History of Singapore, Singapore, 2007/08 - Director
- The Importance of Being Earnest, Singapore, 2009 - Director
- Boeing Boeing, Singapore, 2010 - Director
- Emily of Emerald Hill, Singapore, 2011 - Director
- Into The Woods (New Production), Singapore, 2011 - Director
- Family Outing, Singapore, 2011 - Director
- Aladdin(New Production), Singapore, 2011 - Director
- La Cage aux Folles, Singapore, 2012 - Director
- The Importance of Being Earnest, Singapore, 2013 - Director
- Cook a Pot of Curry, Singapore, 2013 - Director
- The House of Bernarda Alba, Singapore, 2014 - Director
- The Importance of Being Earnest, Macao Arts Festival, 2014 - Director
- The Dim Sum Dollies - The History of Singapore Part 2, Singapore, 2014 - Director
- Public Enemy, Singapore, 2015 - Director
- The Dim Sum Dollies - The History of Singapore Part 1, Singapore, 2015 - Director
- Hotel, Singapore, 2015/16 - Director
- The Importance of Being Earnest, Brisbane Festival, 2015 - Director
- La Cage aux Folles(New Production), Singapore, 2017 - Director
- Hotel, OzAsia Festival, Adelaide, 2017 - Director
- Mama White Snake, Singapore, 2017 - Actor
- Supervision, Singapore, 2018 and 2019 - Director
- Emily of Emerald Hill, Singapore, 2019 - Director
- Merdeka, Singapore, 2019 - Director
- ’’The Importance of Being Earnest,2020 - Director
- ’’The Amazing Celestial Race, 2021 and 2022 - Director
- ’’Momotaro and the Magnificent Peach, 2021 - Director
- ‘’Tartuffe’’, 2022 - Director

=== Film ===
- Forever Fever (a.k.a. That's The Way I Like It), 1998 - Writer, Executive Producer, Director
- Peggy Su!, 1997 - Actor
- The Blue Mansion, 2009 - Executive Producer & director
- I Have Loved, 2011 - Actor
- Demons, 2019 - Actor, Producer
- Revenge of the Pontianak, 2019 - Writer, Executive Producer, Director
- Tiong Bahru Social Club, 2019 - Executive Producer
- Some Women, 2020 - Executive Producer

=== Television ===
- Lovejoy, Episode "Flat Fee", TV Series, 1992 - Translator
- Really Something, Singapore, 2001 - Director

=== Literature ===
- Little Red in the Hood (2014, Epigram Books, ISBN 9789810732233) - Author

=== Large Scale Performance ===
- National Day Parade, Singapore 2003–2006 – creative director
- The Arts House, Opening Ceremony, Singapore, 2004 – director
- IOC Conference, Opening Ceremony, Singapore, 2006 – creative director

=== Project Design ===
- Singapore Pavilion, World Expo, Nagoya, Japan, 2004–2005 – creative director
- New Majestic Hotel, Singapore 2006 – Guest Designer
- One North Bridge Condominium and Offices, 2006 – Creative Designer
- Bintang Goldhill Condominium, Kuala Lumpur 2008 – Creative Designer

== Awards and nominations ==
- Life! Theatre Award for Best Production and Best Director, Hotel, 2016
- Life! Theatre Award for Best Production, The Importance of Being Earnest, 2010
- Singapore Press Holdings Entertainment Awards, Best Film and Best Director, The Blue Mansion, 2010
- National Youth Award (Excellence) for Contribution to the Arts, Singapore, 1994
- The Sunday Times Theatre Award for Best Production and Best Play, Porcelain, 1993
- The Sunday Times Theatre Award for Best Comedy, The Magic Fundoshi, 1993
- Laurence Olivier Award for Best Newcomer in a Play (Nomination), 1989/1990
