= The Star (Malaysia) =

National English-language daily newspaper in Malaysia

- Type: Daily newspaper
- Format: Print, online
- Owner(s): Malaysian Chinese Association (46%, via Huaren Holdings Sdn Bhd), Pemodalan Nasional Berhad (5%)
- Publisher: Chan Seng Fatt
- Editor: Esther Ng
- Founded: 9 September 1971; 55 years ago
- Political alignment: Conservative
- Language: English
- Headquarters: Jalan 16/11, 46350; Petaling Jaya, Selangor Darul Ehsan
- Circulation: 248,413 (Daily Star); 246,652 (Sunday Star); 105,645 (Daily Star E-paper); 104,804 (Sunday Star E-paper); *Source: Audit Bureau of Circulations, Malaysia – July to December 2015
- Website: thestar.com.my

The Star is a national-level English-language newspaper in Malaysia and flagship publication of the publicly listed Star Media Group Berhad (MYX: 6084). Based in Petaling Jaya, it was established in 1971 as a regional newspaper in Penang. It is by far the largest English newspaper in terms of circulation in Malaysia, according to the Audit Bureau of Circulations.

The Star is a member of the Asia News Network.

== History ==
The daily newspaper was first published on 9 September 1971 as a regional newspaper based in Penang. The STAR went into national circulation on 3 January 1976 when it set up its new office in Kuala Lumpur. In 1978, the newspaper headquarters were relocated to Kuala Lumpur. The Star continues to expand its wings over the years. In 1981, it moved its headquarters from Kuala Lumpur to Petaling Jaya which is also its current premise to accommodate a growing number of staff and technology devices.

In March 1984, The Star launched Section 2, which would later be renamed as Star2.

In 1987, The Star was one of the newspapers whose publication licences were withdrawn in Operation Lalang conducted under Mahathir Mohamad's authoritarian prime ministership. It resumed publication five months later in March 1988, but after its return, The Star lost its previous 'liberal flavour'.

It was the first Malaysian paper to offer an online edition.

The Star's dominant position as Malaysia's leading English-language newspaper has, for decades, been of significant benefit to its major shareholder, the Malaysian Chinese Association (MCA) political party (which was a junior member of the Barisan Nasional coalition that ruled from independence until 2018). Between 1997 and 2007, it was estimated that the MCA's investment arm, Huaren Holdings, collected MYR270 million in dividends – almost exclusively from their 42% shareholding in the Star's parent company - with dividends peaking at MYR40 million per year between 2005 and 2007. Despite a significant portion of these dividends funding debts from their later acquisition of Nanyang Siang Pau, a total of MYR100 million was still paid out to the MCA between 2001 and 2007.

== Editions ==
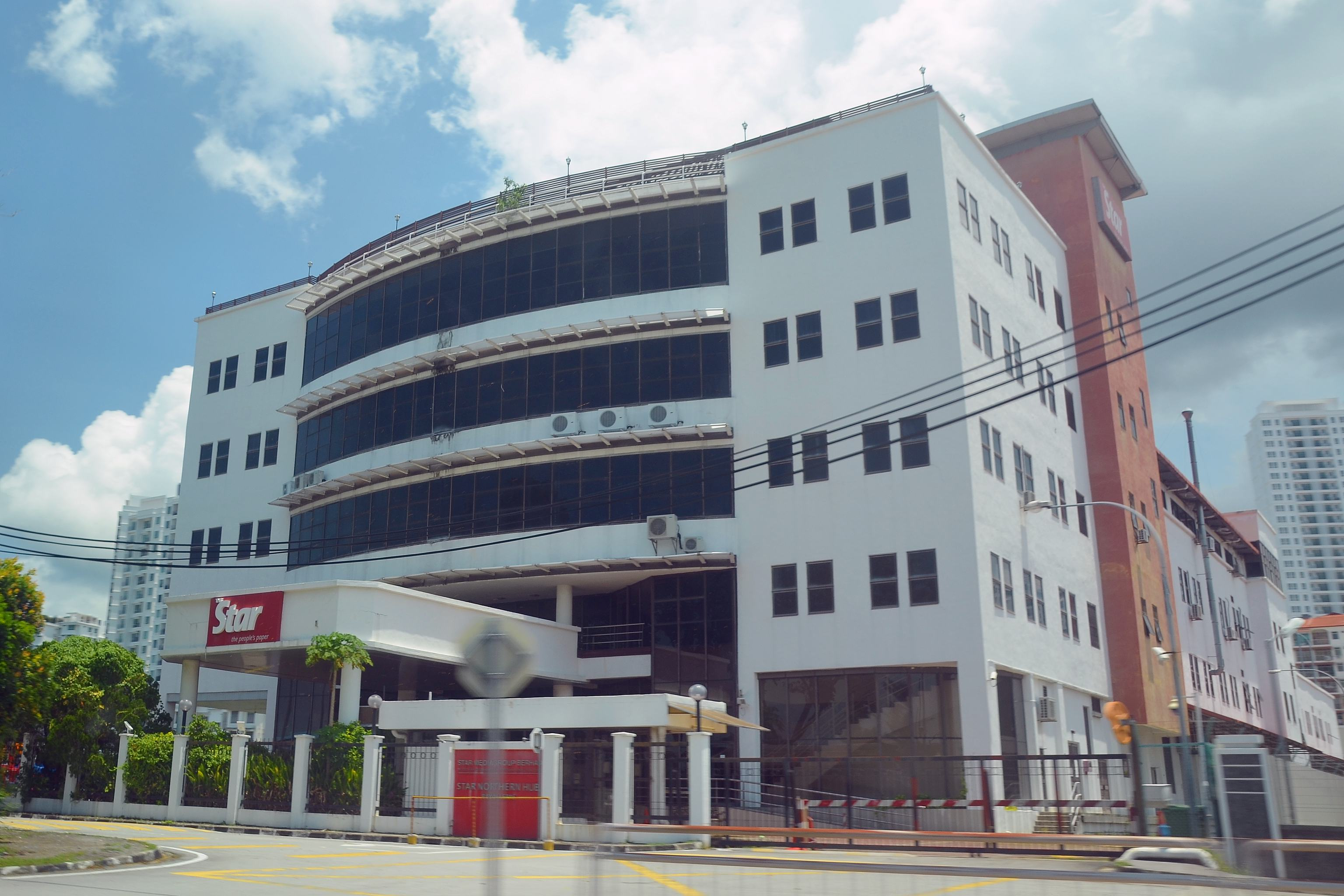
The Star Northern Hub in Bayan Lepas, Penang

The Star (daily) and Sunday Star are published in five editions. Two editions cover the northern peninsular states of Penang, Kedah, Perlis, Kelantan and northern Perak, while another two editions cover the rest of the country. As of March 2010, the newspaper has a separate Sarawak edition priced at RM1.20.

There are two main printing plants that publish four editions of The Star on a daily basis. The northern editions are printed at the Star Northern Hub in Bayan Lepas, Penang, while the other two editions are printed at the Star Media Hub in Bukit Jelutong, Shah Alam, Selangor.

== Features ==
The Star weekday paper is packaged as a 4-in-1 paper, comprising the Main Paper, StarBiz, Star2 and Star Metro. Naturally, this newspaper also contains classifieds.

The Main Paper covers the latest in both local and international news while StarBiz offers a comprehensive coverage of business developments, market trends, financial reports and updates in the stock market. Star2 features articles on lifestyle, entertainment, health, parenting, social etiquette, science, environment, fashion, food, comics and many more. The contents published on the Star Metro varies by edition, covering news and events in a particular region covered by each edition.

Weekly sections include:

- StarBytz (every Monday; formerly known as In-Tech): focuses on computers and information technology
- StarEducate (Sundays): features careers, school, exam tips, advice on furthering education, commentaries by renowned educationists and updates in the education industry
- Star Fit4Life (Sundays): focuses on various aspects of well-being, from medical research to treatments, fitness trends, diet and nutrition, mental health, ageing and public health issues, alternative therapy and healing methods
- Life Inspired (Sundays): a luxury-focused pull-out covering topics from art, architecture, travel, fashion, food and more. This section was launched in October 2013.
- Dots (Sundays): News and articles sourced from international media partners covering a varied range of topics from politics and society to people. Provides a deeper insight into thoughts, senses and outlook
- The Star BizWeek is a weekly financial magazine published every Saturday that highlights issues, companies, personalities, developments, and stocks that are likely to make news in the week ahead
- F1F4 is a fortnightly pull-out published on alternate Mondays. It contains information about Mathematics and Science syllabus for Form One and Form Four.
- Stuff@school is a weekly pullout distributed every Monday to schools that subscribe to The Star. It features newsy articles, interviews, book reviews and short stories dedicated to teens.
- Star Metro is a pull-out featuring news and events from all of Malaysia and occasionally, abroad. Star Metro also features the classifieds.
- CarSifu is a pullout distributed every twice a month on alternating Thursdays that offers updates on the automobile scene.
- R.AGE is the paper's youth-oriented section and pullout with its own journalist team, they now does video-based content with an investigative angle. Their work with the Predator in My Phone series led to the passing of the Sexual Offences Against Children Act 2017. The video documentary series "Student/Trafficked" which unravels the student trafficking syndicate in Malaysia was nominated for a Peabody Award in 2018. They have also won the Kajai Award, Malaysia's most coveted journalism award for two consecutive years.

== Columnists ==
Tunku Abdul Rahman, the first Prime Minister and chairman of the paper's parent company from the 1977 to 1989, also contributed to the newspaper through his column Looking Back which was published every Monday from 1974 to 1989.

His writings in the column, which consisted of his personal accounts in the ruling party in regards to seeking Malaysia's independence, were deemed to be influential and so closely associated with the paper that its name was often backronymed by some readers as Suara Tunku Abdul Rahman (English: the Voice of Tunku Abdul Rahman).

Other notable columnists for The Star include former opposition leader Tan Chee Khoon (whose column was called Without Fear Or Favour) and future Communications minister Fahmi Fadzil (with the reformist column On The Way). Social activists Lee Lam Thye and Marina Mahathir, former Third World Network head Martin Khor, and law professors Shad Saleem Faruqi and Azmi Sharom also had long-running columns.

Popular columnists who also worked at The Star included Wong Chun Wai, June Wong, T. Selva, Joceline Tan, Philip Golingai, Dorairaj Nadason and Martin Vengadesan.

== Ownership ==
The Star is a party-owned paper, associated with the former government of Malaysia. Since 1977, The Star has been effectively controlled by the Malaysian Chinese Association, a component party in the Barisan Nasional alliance, though it is part of the publicly listed Star Media Group (MYX: 6084). The largest stake, at 42.46%, is held by the MCA; the three next-largest shareholders are Amanah Saham Bumiputera, a unit trust scheme exclusive to Bumiputera (15.44%), the Malaysian superannuation scheme, the Employees Provident Fund (5.98%) and Tabung Haji, the government-run hajj savings and investment fund (5.42%). In April 2023, The Edge Communications Sdn. Bhd. and its owner Tan Sri Tong Kooi Ong have bought a stake in The Star, with Tong owning a direct interest of 0.25% stake and a 5.17% indirect interest through The Edge Communications.

== Reception ==
A 2024 Reuters Institute poll found that 58% of Malaysian respondents trusted reporting from The Star. The report also indicated that it was the top English language news outlet for weekly offline reach and the second most popular English language portal for weekly online reach, behind Malaysiakini.

== See also ==
- List of newspapers in Malaysia
