= Krishen Jit =

Krishen Jit a/l Amar Singh (July 10, 1939 – April 28, 2005) was a Malaysian author, playwright and theatre director and critic. He was a writer for the Talking Drama column in the New Sunday Times's Arts & Leisure section under the pen name of Utih from 1972 to 1994.

== Career ==
He transitioned from English language theatre to Malay language theatre in the 1970s, but however left that circle in the 1980s after put-off by internal issues over casting preferences there. He was a co-founder of Five Arts Center with his wife, Marion D’ Cruz and other artists including Chin San Sooi and Redza Piyadasa in 1984.

Jit worked as the acting coach for the 2004 film Puteri Gunung Ledang directed by Saw Teong Hin starring M. Nasir and Tiara Jacquelina.

He died on 28 April 2005 at the University Malaya Medical Centre (PPUM) at the age of 65 after a long battle with stroke.

== Legacy ==
The Astro-Krishen Jit Fund was established by Malaysian satellite TV operator ASTRO was named after him. Jit also a recipient of the Lifetime Achievement Award at the BOH Cameronian Awards, which was first held in 2003.

His book Krishen Jit: An Uncommon Position - Selected Writings was published in 2003 by Contemporary Asian Arts Centre, edited by Kathy Roland and Baha Zain.
