= Tan Tarn How =

Tan Tarn How (Chinese: 陳贊浩; pinyin: Chén Zànhào) is a Singaporean playwright and senior research fellow at the Institute of Policy Studies (Singapore). His plays have been staged in Singapore and Hong Kong, and have won numerous awards. In 2011, Epigram Books published a collection of six of his plays.

== Education and career ==
Tan Tarn How graduated from Peterhouse, Cambridge in 1982 with Bachelor of Arts Honours, Natural Sciences Tripos. He then obtained a Diploma in Education from the Institute of Education, Singapore, in 1984. Tan was also a recipient of a three-month Fulbright Scholarship to Boston University in 1993.

Tan Tarn How is currently working for Institute of Policy Studies, Singapore. Prior to this, he worked at The Straits Times, Singapore's main local newspaper, from 1987–1996 and 1999 to 2005. Posts he held at The Straits Times include Science and Technology editor, Sunday Review editor, Life! deputy editor, senior political correspondent and also a foreign correspondent based in Beijing and Hong Kong.

From 1997 to 1999, Tan was Head Scriptwriter for Drama, Productions Five at the Singapore Television Corporation (now known as Mediacorp).

Tan Tarn How has also been a teacher and television scriptwriter. He is also the part-time Associate Artistic Director of the drama company TheatreWorks, where he has been leading workshops for budding playwrights. He is also a Board Member of the Intercultural Theatre Institute.

== Personal ==
He is married to a dentist and has two daughters.

== Others ==
- 1997 Attended the Shenandoah International Playwrights Retreat in Virginia, sponsored by the Singapore National Arts Council and Shenanarts
- 1989-93 Member of the Theatreworks Writers' Laboratory
- 1989 and 1990 Dramaturge to young playwrights of the Gifted Programme Arts Enrichment Programme

== Plays ==
=== In Praise of the Dentist (1993) ===
This short play was staged by ST*RS.

=== The Lady of Soul and Her Ultimate 'S' Machine (1993) ===
Written as part of TheatreWorks' pioneering Writers' Lab, The Lady of Soul and Her Ultimate 'S' Machine enjoyed a first reading in January 1992, directed by Ivan Heng, whom Tan credits for bringing out the "comic possibilities" of the play. Actor Gerald Chew acted in this reading, and in 2001 directed it for TheatreWorks' theatre retrospective, Charging Up Memory Lane.

After the reading, The Lady of Soul and Her Ultimate 'S' Machine was submitted to the police's Public Entertainment Licensing Unit for vetting. The script came back from the police - then the body responsible for arts licensing, a task that now falls on the Media Development Authority - with objections to material in 36 of its 67 pages, including: that Singapore is a nation without soul; that the play promotes sex and communism; that the play ridicules past committees as inefficient; that politicians were more interested in winning votes than delivering on promises. In October 1992, Tan sent in a letter of appeal to the licensing unit and the play was passed clean, a beneficiary of the revised guidelines proposed by the Censorship Review Committee.

First staged by TheatreWorks from January to February 1993, directed by Ong Keng Sen and starring actors Lut Ali, Lim Kay Tong and Jacintha Abisheganaden. Reviewing the play for The Straits Times, theatre critic Hannah Pandian called it "a watershed in Singapore theatre: it is arguably the first English play to present the country critically and artistically, without hiding behind coy allegory".

The Lady of Soul and Her Ultimate 'S' Machine will be restaged in 2015 as part of the Esplanade – Theatres on the Bay' celebrations of Singapore's Golden Jubilee.

=== Home (1993) ===
Staged by Theatreworks in 1990. Re-staged by Nanyang Technological University Playhouse.

=== Undercover (1994) ===
Tan Tarn How was joint winner of the National Book Development Council Drama Award in 1996 for this play.

=== Six of the Best (1996) ===
Staged by Theatreworks.

=== The First Emperor's Last Days (1998) ===
This play was staged for the Singapore Arts Festival by TheatreWorks. Later, it was staged for the Asian Performing Arts Festival in Hong Kong by Chung Ying Theatre. The play won the Hong Kong Best Ten Productions of The Year Award.

=== Machine (2002) ===
Machine was staged in Singapore at The Black Box, Fort Canning by Theatreworks. Tan won Best Script in Singapore’s premier theatre award, The 3rd DBS Life! Theatre Awards, for Machine in 2003.

=== Fear of Writing (2011) ===
Staged by Theatreworks, with Ong Keng Sen as Director and an all-female cast.

In 2015, Fear of Writing was selected by The Business Times as one of the "finest plays in 50 years" alongside productions by Goh Poh Seng, Michael Chiang and Alfian Sa'at and others.

== Publications ==
- Fear of Writing (Epigram Books, 2012) ISBN 9789810714529
- Six Plays (Epigram Books, 2011) ISBN 9789810879778
- Personality + Power = Changes Unlikely (Tan Tarn How, Arun Mahizhnan, eds., Singapore Perspectives 2004: At the Dawn of a New Era, Marshall Cavendish Academic for IPS, 2004)
- The Lady of Soul and Her Ultimate 'S' Machine (Sirius Books, 1993) ISBN 9810045824

== Articles ==
Some articles Tan Tarn How wrote for The Straits Times:

- July 28, 2002 Kampung Boys Across Causeway All Grown Up
- July 25, 2002 Competition Spurs Malaysia And Singapore
- July 22, 2002 Government Cuts Apron Strings With Home-Loan Policy Shift http://straitstimes.asia1.com.sg/singapore/story/0,1870,133286,00.html
- July 8, 2002 12 Bills Passed, But So Many Missed Chances
- July 6, 2002 Probe Into Web Articles Spooks Net Community https://web.archive.org/web/20020711182951/http://straitstimes.asia1.com.sg/singapore/story/0,1870,130265,00.html
- July 6, 2002 Public Money, But Who Does Public TV Serve? http://straitstimes.asia1.com.sg/singapore/story/0,1870,130219,00.html
