= Abisheganaden =

Abisheganaden is a surname. Notable people with the surname include:

- Alex Abisheganaden (1926–2023), Singaporean guitarist
- Jacintha Abisheganaden (born 1957), Singaporean singer, actress, and theater practitioner
- Paul Abisheganaden (1914–2011), Singaporean conductor
