= Beauty World (musical) =

- Music: Dick Lee
- Lyrics: Michael Chiang
- Book: Michael Chiang
- Productions: 1992 Japanese tour

Beauty World is a Singaporean musical written by Michael Chiang and composed by Dick Lee. Drawing on the tradition of 1950s black-and-white Cantonese movies, it tells the story of a young Malaysian girl who comes from Batu Pahat to 1960s Singapore in search of her father and winds up in the eponymous sleazy night club. It premiered at the 1988 Singapore Arts Festival.

Written in English with some Singlish elements and Singaporean slang, it is one of the best known musicals of Singapore. With Makan Place, which was also written in 1988, it is one of the first two Singaporean musicals.

== Plot ==
Ivy Chan travels from Malaysia to Singapore in hopes of finding her father. Her only clue is a jade pendant inscribed with the words "Beauty World". Once in Singapore, Ivy meets her penpal friend, Rosemary Joseph. Beauty World turns out to be a cabaret, commanded by head girl LuLu. Ivy goes undercover at Beauty World, where she grows closer to the cabaret members, especially the club's bouncer, Ah Hock. This complicates things when Ivy's boyfriend, Frankie, comes to Singapore to bring her home.

=== Act l ===
In 1960s Singapore, The Beauty world Cabaret is a thriving spot of nightlife (“Beauty world Cha-Cha-Cha”)along with its iconic cast of characters: The Madame who is in charge of the Cabaret, Towkay Neo a rich businessman who is a frequent client of the Cabaret, and Lulu the Cabaret's main star. Towkay Neo and the other clients of the Cabaret ask Lulu to sing a song for them, in which she does while expressing to the audience, of how she is willing to use any man she can get her hands on in order to climb her way to the top of riches and glory (“Nothing gets in my way”).

Ivy Chan is a young girl who has recently arrived in Singapore from Batu Pahat, she meets up with her Penpal, Rosemary Joseph, who runs the Elizabeth Tailor dress shop. As the two go to the Polar cafe to chat, Ivy reveals the reason she left Malaysia, was because all her life, she has been told that both her parents had died by food poisoning on their wedding day, but recently Ivy has discovered a jade pendent with the words “Beauty world” inscribed on it left behind by her real Father ("I didn’t care"). She also mentions that she left behind her Boyfriend, Frankie Wong, back in Malaysia, leaving him a note explaining where she went. Rosemary tells Ivy that was a bad decision, especially considering how hard it is to find a man nowadays when you are incredibly shy, hinting at her own love life (“Single in Singapore”). Ivy ends up making up her mind, and decides to go into Beauty World undercover, to discover more about her father.

Ivy ends up meeting Beauty World's Bouncer and Bartender: Ah Hock, she also ends up meeting Beauty World's Maid, Wan Choo. Ivy meets the Madame and after some long consulting, gets herself hired for 1 week as a drink waitress, then if the Madame likes her, she can stay, if not, then she goes. As Ivy goes into the dressing room, she ends up meeting the other girls of the Cabaret: Daisy, Lily, and Rosie, who teach Ivy the ways to work in a Cabaret and how to seduce a man (“There’ll be a new you”). As the night begins, Frankie Wong meets with Rosemary, saying that he needs to find Ivy, Rosemary tries to persuade Frankie to stop searching, but Frankie tells Rosemary he will do anything to find her, No matter how hard it is ("Ivy"). Rosemary ends up relenting, which leads to Frankie visiting the Beauty world Cabaret as a client, in which Ivy makes Wan Choo hide her from his sight. Ivy then serves a drink to Towkay Neo who starts taking an interest in her because of her Beauty, prompting Ivy to sing a song with the other Cabaret girls ("Look at me"). Lulu, turns incredibly jealous, leading to a confrontation, in which Lulu, accuses Ivy of stealing her dress and shaming her. Ivy then storms out of the back door crying after the nights recent events. Ah Hock checks up on her and keeps her company, forming a little romance between the two. Ah Hock then dreams about how if life did not make him work in a Cabaret, where he would be now (“Another World”). At night, Ivy ends up snooping through the Madame's room to look for pieces of evidence from her father's past, however is caught by Lulu, who rats her out to the Madame for stealing. After Ivy tells the Madame she was not stealing, Ivy reflects on whether or not she wants to hear the truth in the first place, and what effect will it have on her when she eventually does learn the truth ("Suddenly"). As Ivy continues with her daily chores at Beauty World, she ends up meeting Ah Hock privately on the roof by accident, in which both of them share a moment looking at the stars and enjoying the peace and quiet ("Count your blessings").

Meanwhile, Lulu ends up bribing Towkay Neo to make Ivy drink a glass of alcohol with sleeping powder laced in it, and then to carry her to a hotel room in order to rape her. The audience is reassured however about how this story has a happier ending by a chorus formed of the Cabaret girls and clients (“Truth conquers all”).

=== Act ll ===
As another active night of debauchery continues at the Cabaret (“Welcome to Beauty World”), Frankie gives up on looking for Ivy inside the Cabaret and returns to Rosemary's dress shop where the two resolve to just simply wait for Ivy to return, in which Frankie ends up falling asleep. Meanwhile, as Ivy is almost raped by Towkay Neo, she is saved by Ah Hock who knew where Ivy was by consulting with Wan Choo who saw Lulu sabotage Ivy the entire time. As Ivy is still passed out, Rosemary thinks about her forbidden developing romance with Frankie, while Ah Hock thinks about his Forbidden developing romance with Ivy (“It wasn’t meant for me”). As Rosemary goes to look for Ivy herself, she ends up getting into a heated argument about social classes with Lulu (“No Class”). Rosemary then uses the help of Sergeant Muthu, a police officer who is a close friend of hers, in order to purposefully make everyone in the whole of Beauty world to help realize who Ivy's parents are, after a long realization, Ivy's mother is revealed to be Lulu while her father is revealed to be a Japanese Soldier who never came back after going to fight in the war. It is then revealed that Lulu did not have enough money to raise the baby, so her brother took the baby and dropped it outside of a hair salon in Batu Pahat, Malaysia. Ivy is given the decision to stay with her mother at Beauty world, or go back to Batu Pahat with Frankie ("At last"). Ivy chooses to go back home with Frankie, as the various other characters of Beauty world move on with their lives, with the audience given some insight on what some of their futures are like (“Beauty World reprise”).

== Productions ==
The original 1988 production began rehearsals in January of that year. It was directed by Ong Keng Sen and choreographed by Najip Ali. On opening night, technical issues halted the show for about half an hour. Actresses Claire Wong and Jacintha Abisheganaden adlibbed a conversation for about five minutes, hoping to fill the silence. Although critical response to the show was negative, it was very popular with audiences.

Beauty World toured four cities in Japan (Osaka, Tokyo, Hiroshima and Fukuoka) and had a run in Singapore in 1992. In 1998, the musical was staged for television for the President's Star Charity Show, and starred Sharon Au as Lulu, and Evelyn Tan as Ivy. The musical was produced again at the Victoria Theater in April of that same year.

In 2008, W!LD RICE, celebrated the 20th anniversary of the musical by staging the musical for the fourth time at the Esplanade Theatre. The musical starred Irene Ang, Neo Swee Lin, Elena Wang and also featured Daren Tan, Project Superstar II winner. The production also added six new songs, written by Dick Lee.

In 2014, a student production of Beauty World was put up by National University of Singapore (NUS) College of Alice and Peter Tan (CAPT) on 8 February, which opened to a 900-strong audience at the University Culture Centre at NUS and was attended by its scriptwriter and playwright, Chiang. The musical was produced by Ong Wee Yong and Sherilyn Tan. It was directed by Heidi Chan and took its musical direction from Elaine Hoong. Vocal coach and chorus conductor Chan Jun Hao helmed the training of all singers.

In 2015, the musical was staged for the seventh time at the Victoria Theatre, with composer Lee as the director instead. The production was set to be in a darker mood and starred Jeanette Aw, Cheryl Tan and Janice Koh.

== Musical numbers ==
=== Act l ===
- "Beauty World Cha-Cha-Cha" (Chorus)
- "Nothing Gets in My Way" (Lulu)
- "Single in Singapore" (Rosemary)
- "There'll Be a New You" (Lily, Rosie, and Daisy)
- "Ivy" (Frankie and Chorus) †
- "Look at Me" (Ivy, Rosie, Lily, and Daisy) †
- "Another World" (Ah Hock)
- "I Didn't Care" (Ivy)
- "Suddenly" (Ivy) †
- "Count your blessings" (Ivy, and Ah Hock) †
- "Truth Will Conquer All" (Chorus)

=== Act ll ===
- "Welcome to Beauty World" (Madame, Lulu, Wan Choo, and Chorus)
- "It Wasn't Meant For Me" (Rosemary and Ah Hock)
- "No Class" (Lulu and Rosemary)
- "Not A Hero" (Frankie and Chorus)
- "At Last" (Ivy) †
- "Beauty World Reprise" (Company)

† Only appears in productions of 2008 and onwards

== Cast ==
Character	1988TheatreWorks	1992 (TheatreWorks' Japan Tour)	1998 (TV remake)	1998 TheatreWorks	2008 W!LD RICE	2015 TheatreWorks
Lulu	Christina Ong	Tan Kheng Hua	Sharon Au	Sharon Au	Denise Tan	Jeanette Aw
Ivy Chan	Claire Wong	Cindy Sim	Evelyn Tan	Emma Yong	Elena Wang	Cheryl Tan
Ah Hock	Lim Kay Siu	Gerald Chew	Darren Lim	Darren Lim	Darren Tan	Timothy Wan
Rosemary Joseph	Jacintha Abisheganaden	Rosita Ng	Jacintha Abisheganaden	Jacintha Abisheganaden		Frances Lee
Frankie Wong	Ivan Heng	Alec Tok	Hossan Leong	Hossan Leong		Joshua Lim
Madame	Margaret Chan	Nora Samosir	Koh Chieng Mun	Nora Samosir	Neo Swee Lin	Janice Koh
Wan Choo	Lok Meng Chue	Jayln Han	Jack Neo	Neo Swee Lin	Irene Ang	Eleanor Tan
Sergeant Muthu	Alex Abisheganaden	K. Rajagopal	Gurmit Singh	Gurmit Singh		Ali Anwar
Rosie	Janet Ng	Janet Ng	Vernetta Lopez	Janet Ng	Esther Yap	Cynthia MacQuarrie
Daisy	Tan Kheng Hua	Noorlinah Mohamed	Cassandra See	Susan Tay	Cheryl Miles	Ethel Yap
Lily	Deborah Png	Deborah Png	Irin Gan	Dianne Swee	Judee Tan	Tay Kewel
Towkay Tan	Tann Yean	Lee Weng Kee	Huang Wenyong	Ken Tay		Edward Choy
Towkay Neo	Tony Yeow	Tann Yean	Richard Low	Wong Yik Looi		Gordon Choy
Boss Quek	John Chan	Lim Yu-beng	James Lye	Lim Kay Tong		Edric Hsu
