= Kuo Pao Kun =

Singaporean playwright

Kuo Pao Kun 郭宝崑
- Kuo in 1989
- Born: 1939; Hebei Province, China
- Died: 10 September 2002 (aged 63); Singapore
- Spouse: Goh Lay Kuan
- Children: Daughters: Kuo Jian Hong; Okorn-Kuo Jing Hong
- Writing career
- Period: 1965–2002
- Genre: Chinese play
- Notable works: The Coffin is Too Big for the Hole; Descendants of the Eunuch Admiral
- Notable awards: 1989: Cultural Medallion; 1992: Culture Award, JCCI, Singapore; 1993: ASEAN Cultural Award (Performing Arts); 1996: Chevalier de l'Ordre des Arts et des Lettres; 2002: Excellence for Singapore Award

Kuo Pao Kun (1939 – 10 September 2002) (simplified Chinese: 郭宝崑; traditional Chinese: 郭寶崑; pinyin: Guō Bǎokūn; Wade–Giles: Kuo^{1} Pao^{3} K'un^{1}) was a playwright, theatre director, and arts activist in Singapore who wrote and directed both Mandarin and English plays. He founded three arts and drama centres in Singapore, conducted and organised a number of drama seminars and workshops, and mentored Singaporean and foreign directors and artists.

Kuo is acknowledged by both locals and foreigners as the pioneer of Singapore theatre, and was awarded the Cultural Medallion in 1990 for his contributions to Singapore theatre. His plays are characterised for their dramatic and social commentary, use of simple metaphors and multiculturalism themes, and have been staged locally and internationally.

== Early life ==
Kuo Pao Kun was born in Hebei Province, China in 1939 to Kuo Fung Ting and Zhou Qiao. He moved to Beijing with his mother in 1947, and spent nine months in transition in Hong Kong before being called to Singapore at the age of 10 by his businessman father.

Kuo lived with his father in High Street, and first attended Catholic High School's primary section. Due to various circumstances, however, Kuo transferred between both Chinese and English-medium schools many times. At one point, when he attended the Chinese High School in 1956, his father transferred him to Kallang West Government Chinese Middle School (now Dunman High School) before moving him to Hong Kong due to the student unrest generated by politically activist Chinese high school and middle school students, largely out of concern for the political expedience of the unrest. When the student unrest ended in 1957, Kuo returned to Singapore to attend the English-medium Pasir Panjang Secondary School. Kuo attended a total of six schools in six years.

In 1955, Kuo joined Rediffusion's Mandarin radio play section at 14 years of age, (Lo) and worked as a broadcaster, in addition to performing and writing radio dramas and Chinese xiangsheng. His early years in Hebei and Beijing had led to his acquiring of his trademark Beijing-accented Mandarin, which he once described as "like having a BBC accent in English", and which advantaged him as a broadcaster. After Kuo finished high school in 1959, his experience in broadcasting and bilingual advantage from his education enabled him to secure a job as a translator/announcer in Melbourne with Radio Australia, where he worked for three and a half years. In 1963, he took up an intensive, two-year drama programme with the National Institute of Dramatic Art (NIDA) in Sydney, while working in technical theatre at the Old Tote. The course gave him a "strong, solid grounding" in many aspects of contemporary Western theatre and introduced him to Western classical theatre. During his studies in NIDA, Kuo also became engaged to choreographer and dancer Goh Lay Kuan.

== Career and works from 1965 to 1976 ==
Upon returning to Singapore in 1965, Kuo and Goh founded the Practice Performing Arts School (PPAS) on 1 July that year, providing professional dance and drama courses. The founding date was also the day that Kuo married Goh. During this period, public perception of Chinese drama was largely shaped by its historical association with cultural and mass political movements. Consequently, the introduction of tuition fees for drama instruction met with significant public resistance, as the practice was viewed by many as incompatible with the medium's traditional role in social and political mobilization. For many years, the dance wing subsidised classes in the drama wing. Despite the fact that the idea of professional theatre was not widely accepted then, Kuo noted that young people from all walks of life devoted themselves to theatre courses and remained highly involved in PPAS productions even after they had completed the drama course.

In 1966, Kuo translated and produced The Caucasian Chalk Circle in Mandarin, the first Brecht play performed in Singapore. Kuo and Goh's first daughter Kuo Jian Hong was born in 1967, followed by their second daughter Kuo Jing Hong in 1971.

Singaporean Chinese contemporary theatre in the 1960s and 1970s was highly politicised, given the field's roots in social movements, the turbulent state reforms of the local social and political environment after Singapore's independence, and the increasingly political and revolutionary environment internationally . The Cultural Revolution in China, which began in 1966, impacted local Singaporean Chinese in the 1970s. Many were influenced by its trend of thought, viewing art, literature and drama as weapons of struggle and tools of social change. Kuo's first plays, written from the late 1960s to the mid-1970s, were also "highly politicised" and "critical of social issues." One of the plays, titled The Struggle (1969), was written by Kuo to reflect the social turmoil resulting from rapid urban reconstruction and inflow of multinational investment, but its performance was banned by the authorities. Critics also noted that Kuo's early plays characteristically displayed a clear-cut distinction between the "good" (tradition and class unity) and the "bad" (exploitative capitalists).

In 1972, Kuo and his students and ex-students from PPAS launched the "Go into Life Campaign" to experience life of labouring masses in Singapore and Malay Peninsula. Their guiding ideology was that "art came from life. Without knowing life firsthand and deeply, especially the life of the labouring masses, it would be difficult to write good artistic work". The campaign resulted in the proliferation of original works based on real-life stories of labouring people, including The Fishing Village.

== Detention and effects ==
The growing force and increasingly political nature of Chinese theatre culminated into the 1976 massive leftist purge, where hundreds, including Kuo, were detained without trial under the Internal Security Act. Kuo spent four years and seven months in detention, during which the state revoked his citizenship. Kuo described the detention as "a moment of humbleness" and "a very sobering experience– you get cut down, you know that you don't know enough." The incident caused Kuo to undergo a major re-evaluation and reflection of his perceptions and thoughts. He was released in 1980 under restrictions in residence and travel, and resumed teaching drama at PPAS in 1981. The restrictions were lifted in 1983, and his citizenship reinstated in 1992.

== After 1980 ==
=== Written plays and productions ===
Kuo resumed directing, producing and writing plays immediately after his release. His first production, The Little White Sailing Boat (1982), was written and directed by him on behalf of 14 Chinese drama groups at the Singapore Arts Festival, and was well received by the Chinese drama circles.

In 1984, Kuo wrote the draft of his first English play, a monologue entitled The Coffin is too Big for the Hole. Kuo later submitted Coffin in response to the Singapore Arts Festival guest director's call to local writers to present sketches of Singapore life. Some of these submissions were incorporated into a performance entitled Bum Boat. Although The Coffin was not selected. He also wrote a monologue "No Parking on Odd Days" a story of a Singapore man who faced the fines he get from the traffic police. Kuo carried on to write the play in Mandarin, and staged it in 1985 with Zou Wen Xue in the lead role. He then invited Lim Kay Tong to perform the original English version. The performance was well received, and brought Kuo to the forefront of the English language stage in Singapore. Other plays such as Kopitiam was also recognised The Coffin has since been adapted and performed numerous times both locally and internationally, in countries such as Malaysia, Hong Kong, China, Japan and France.

In 2015, Mama Looking For Her Cat was selected by The Business Times as one of the "finest plays in 50 years" alongside productions by Goh Poh Seng, Michael Chiang and Alfian Sa'at and others.

== Institutions founded/co-founded ==
=== The Practice Performing Arts School (PPAS) (1965) ===
The PPAS was founded by both Kuo and Goh as the Singapore Performing Arts School. It aimed to integrate dance, drama and music training, and create a symbiosis between creative performance and arts education. Kuo served as principal of the school until 2002. The PPAS has played an instrumental role in grooming local talents, some of whom mentored under Kuo. Graduates of PPAS include:

- Dramatist and Cultural Medallion winner Han Laoda, who participated in PPAS' eighth drama course in 1970.
- W!LDRICE artistic director Ivan Heng, and Alvin Tan, artistic director of professional drama company, The Necessary Stage. Both attended the school's third directing workshop.
- Ong Keng Sen, artistic director of TheatreWorks and winner of the National Arts Council Young Artist Award in 1993. He attended the school's second directing workshop in 1986.

=== The Theatre Practice (1986) ===
Kuo officially founded The Theatre Practice company in 1986 as the bilingual, semi-professional Practice Theatre Ensemble (PTE), based on a plan worked out in 1967 with Lim Kim Hiong. The company was later renamed The Theatre Practice in 1997. Kuo served as the company's artistic director until his death in 2002. Kuo mentored a number of local talents who worked with the Theatre practice, including Ang Gey Pin of Theatre Ox, Verena Tay and Cindy Sim.

=== The Substation (1990) ===
Kuo founded The Substation in 1990 from a disused Public Utilities Board power station at Armenian Street, with the aim of nurturing local artists and to serve as a community-funded, non-profit arts centre for workshops, concerts, lectures and exhibitions. He first visited the station in 1985, and, with advice from architect Tay Kheng Soon, submitted a proposal to the Singapore government to set up an arts centre. The proposal was accepted. Kuo himself oversaw the renovation and design of the building's interior. In 1989, he formed a team with Tan Beng Luan to prepare the launch of the arts centre as "The Substation – A Home for the Arts", and was appointed as its artistic director during its official opening in 1990. Kuo served this role until he resigned in 1995, to spend more time writing and directing plays. He also stated that he stepped down to devote his energy to the PPAS, of which he was acting principal, and to PTE, of which he was artistic director.

Under Kuo's direction, The Substation's orientation during the 1990s was as an inter-disciplinary, multicultural and pioneering arts space, particularly for experimental arts. With diversity, The Substation also provided a platform for young talent, who did not have the money or influence to mount their work elsewhere. The Substation was initially criticised for its unsophisticated repertoire of new and young artists. There were also concerns that The Substation promoted "rock culture", and that Kuo was being too lax in embracing any form of work as "art". Kuo's views remained unchanged by the criticisms; his primary concern was that "it is the process that counts. I am not interested in the end product, the finished piece. Where else will these budding talents get space to call their own?"

It was through his endeavours in The Substation that Kuo's quote on failure arose:

"Instead of shunning failure, The Substation endeavours to thrive on it... that a worthy failure is more valuable than a mediocre success." (emphasis added)

=== The Theatre Training & Research Programme (TTRP) at PPAS (2000) ===
The tertiary-level TTRP, was located at Middle Road, was founded in 2000 by Kuo and T. Sasitharan, after a period when Kuo seriously considered closing down the PPAS due to lack of funds. When Kuo informed two of the School's supporters, Creative Technology's founder Sim Wong Hoo (whom Kuo first met in the 70's when the latter studied music at PPAS) and the Lee Foundation about the closure, both responded with monetary donations. Sim made a S$2 million donation to the school in addition to offering the use of 12,000 sq ft (1,100 m^{2}) of Creative's premises to house the new TTRP, while the Lee Foundation donated S$400,000.

Kuo remained as the programme's co-director until 2002. Later, TTRP was moved from Creative Technology's headquarters in Jurong Industrial Business Park to its current premises in June 2005.

The TTRP was the result of Kuo's effort to create a training programme rooted in different classical Asian performance traditions. The programme covers Chinese, Japanese, Indian, Indonesian and contemporary Western theatre, and implements the ideals and ideas in theatre training that Kuo accumulated and developed over his lifetime career. In the three-year course, students are trained in areas encompassing acting, performance, theatre theory and the practice of working across linguistic and cultural boundaries. Its curriculum includes courses in Acting Approaches, Movement, Voice & Speech, tai chi martial arts, and meditation and immersions in Theatre Traditions. Faculty members included both local and foreign experts such as Noh master Kanze Hideo and Ma Huitian, and graduates from the program include actresses Yeo Yann Yann and Leanne Ong Teck Lian.

=== The Intercultural Theatre Institute (ITI) at Emily Hill (2013) ===
The TTRP has been renamed Intercultural Theatre Institute, located at Upper Wilkie Road, as an independent theatre school for contemporary artists, conceived as a unique enterprise in theatre training, social and cultural interaction, and human understanding.

== International links and influence ==
Kuo met with and invited many distinguished experts in the arts to Singapore to contribute to drama camps, seminars and workshops which he organised in Singapore. Yu Qiuyu and Ren Baoxian were invited in the early 1990s to PPAS as guest lecturers, and Wong May was invited from Hong Kong to join PTE as resident director. Besides initiating creative exchanges with the new theatres of Northeast Asia and Southeast Asia, Kuo was also invited to foreign countries and international conferences, including the US, China, Germany, France, Japan and Korea, where he delivered papers and keynote addresses, and assessed theatres and drama institutions. Kuo also collaborated with directors and artistes from Taiwan, Hong Kong and mainland China in projects, including Stan Lai, Li Jiayao and John Saltzer.

Kuo's plays have been translated into German, Japanese, Hindi, Malay, Tamil and French. Since the 1980s, they have been performed in Asian countries, including Hong Kong, Malaysia and China, as well as in Australia, the USA, Europe, Africa and the Middle East.

In 2000, the Tokyo Asian Art Festival organised a tribute to Kuo by staging three of his plays. The plays were each directed and performed by people of different nationalities in their own languages. The Coffin was directed by Putu Wijaya and performed by Teater Mandiri of Indonesia; Lao Jiu was directed by Anuradha Kapur and performed by Dishantar of India; and The Silly Little Girl and the Funny Old Tree was directed by Makoyo Sato and performed by the Black Tent Theatre of Japan.

In 2015, during the Singapore Festival in France, The Coffin was the first Singapore play to be performed in French, alongside Emily of Emerald Hill by Stella Kon, translated and directed by Marc Goldberg.

== Death ==
In his last years, Kuo devoted most of his energy to the Theatre Training & Research Programme. He was diagnosed with kidney cancer in July 2001, and died on 10 September 2002, at the age of 63, from kidney and liver cancer. He is survived by his wife and two daughters. Goh currently serves as an artistic advisor at TTP, alongside Jian Hong as an artistic director.
