= Terence Crawford (actor) =

Australian actor, author, theatre director, academic and songwriter

Terence Michael Crawford is an Australian actor, author, theatre director, academic and songwriter. He graduated from the acting course at National Institute of Dramatic Art (NIDA) in 1984, and went on to gain additional academic qualifications as well as writing and performing plays. He has also been head of acting at several drama schools in Australia and Singapore, and taught courses at both undergraduate and postgraduate level. He is also a musician, playing in his band Almost Evelyn.

== Early life and education ==
Terence Michael Crawford graduated from NIDA in Sydney as an actor in 1984.

He achieved a Masters of Creative Arts (Hons) from James Cook University in 2000. His play The Fatherless, adaptation of Chekhov's Ivanov, formed part of his thesis.

His PhD thesis, from University of Sydney in 2015, was entitled "Real Human in this Fantastical World: Political, Artistic and Fictive concerns of actors in rehearsal: an ethnography".

== Acting career ==
Crawford has acted with many of Australia's major theatre companies, as well as in television programs and films, including The Babadook and Stateless. He was part of State Theatre Company of South Australia for five years.

In 2017 and 2018, he toured Australia, and to the Auckland and Singapore Arts Festivals, playing O'Brien in Headlong, Almeida Theatre, and Nottingham Playhouse's production of Duncan MacMillan and Robert Icke's adaptation of George Orwell's 1984.

His plays include Pushin' Up Daisies and Shondelle the Tiger. Crawford's work has been produced by theatre companies including Griffin Theatre Company Theatre or Image and Sydney Theatre Company, as well as for radio and television. Love's Triumph was published in a collection by the Australian Script Centre in 2006.

Crawford has directed productions of many Shakespearean plays. He has spoken about the importance of producing new Australian drama:

"We must stage Shakespeare and Chekhov and the great plays of the canon. ... Bell Shakespeare is a great theatre company, led by a great actor and director, doing a great service to its community. But it is in [sic] nonetheless true that if that company was producing a new Australian play a year that was three-quarters as good as the plays it is presenting, a play with actors at the centre of the event in the manner that Shakespeare teaches us, we would now be celebrating a great Australian theatrical epoch."

== Academia ==
Crawford has held head of acting positions at Theatre Nepean (New South Wales), Theatre Training & Research Programme (Singapore; now Intercultural Theatre Institute) and the Lasalle College of the Arts (Singapore).

From 2008 and as of 2016 he was head of acting at the Adelaide College of the Arts.

He has also been a director at the Western Australian Academy of Performing Arts and a guest at L'École Internationale de Théâtre Jacques Lecoq (Paris).

In 2014 Crawford was appointed adjunct professor at the J.M. Coetzee Centre for Creative Practice, University of Adelaide.

As well as teaching acting, Crawford has taught play-writing, dramaturgy, and directing at undergraduate and postgraduate levels.

== Other roles and recognition ==
In 2016, Crawford stood for election to the South Australian Senate for the Arts Party.

In 2018, Crawford he gave the keynote address at the inaugural AusAct conference, at Charles Sturt University.

He plays guitar and has written many songs with songwriting partner Richard Davies as well as on his own. These songs have featured in various theatrical and musical contexts, and are played by his band, Almost Evelyn, which includes Max Garcia-Underwood on vocals and guitar and Nicola Grant on vocals. They have played live around Adelaide pubs, including The Wheatsheaf, were featured on Triple J Unearthed, and in 2021 they released an eponymous EP.

== Selected publications ==
- Dimensions of Acting: An Australian Approach Currency Press 2011; ISBN 9780868198835
- Trade Secrets: Australian Actors and Their Craft Currency Press 2005; ISBN 0868197637
- "The Castanet Club: History, provenance and influence". Australasian Drama Studies, No. 66, Apr 2015: [225]-252. ISSN: 0810–4123.
- "Feudal positions and the pathology of contentment: Sites of disconnection for Australian theatre actors". About Performance, No. 13, 2015: 23–43. ISSN: 1324–6089.
- "Finding the light: Acting as an artistic and social project" Fusion Journal, no. 15, 2019, pp. 6–17.
- "Real Human in this Fantastical World: Political, Artistic and Fictive Concerns of Actors in Rehearsal: An Ethnography"
