= Sreejith =

Sreejith may refer to:

- Sreejith Ravi, Indian film actor
- Sreejith Ramanan, Indian theatre director, actor, theatre trainer
- Sreejith Vijay, Indian film and television actor

== See also ==
- Srijit Mukherji, Indian Bengali film director
