= Michael Chiang =

Singaporean playwright and screenwriter

- Born: 27 October 1955 (age 71); Muar, Federation of Malaya (now Malaysia)
- Organization(s): Mediacorp, TheatreWorks

Michael Chiang (born 27 October 1955 in Muar, Malaysia) is a prolific playwright and screenwriter in Singapore. He is known as "Singapore's most famous and successful playwright".

From 1990 to 2009, Chiang was the editorial director of Mediacorp Publishing, which publishes 8 Days. The playwright of Army Daze (1987) and Beauty World (1988), Chiang had his plays were collected in and published as Private Parts and Other Playthings in 1994 by Landmark Books and Play Things in 2014.

In 2015, Army Daze was selected by The Business Times as one of the "finest plays in 50 years" alongside productions by Goh Poh Seng, Kuo Pao Kun and Alfian Sa'at and others.

== Early life ==
Born in Muar, Malaysia, to a schoolteacher and housewife, Chiang came to Singapore at the age of 11 and attended the Anglo-Chinese School, where he was placed in the care of his eldest brother Dr Chiang Hai Ding. He is the youngest of seven siblings, including an adopted younger sister. As a child, he made frequent visits to the cinema, and developed a taste for the Hong Kong classics of the 1960s.

He graduated from the National University of Singapore with majors in English Literature, Chinese Studies and Philosophy. He briefly worked in the technical supplies department of Singapore Airlines for a few months and became a journalist in the tabloid New Nation in 1980. In 1992, Chiang became a Singapore citizen.

== Career ==
Chiang's foray into playwriting began in 1984, when he was an entertainment journalist and editor for The Sunday Times. He was invited to submit a light-hearted play for the Singapore Arts Festival's Bumboat production because he wrote humour columns for the newspaper. The result, Beauty Box, about beauty queens and shopping malls, was savaged by critics but popular with audiences.

Chiang followed this up with Love & Belachan (1985), which starred Lim Kay Tong and Jacintha Abisheganaden, and a book about life in National Service, titled Army Daze. The book was so popular that he was convinced by TheatreWorks to do a stage version of it in 1987. Nine years later, Army Daze was adapted into a movie.

In 1988, singer-songwriter Dick Lee approached Chiang to write a Singapore musical. With Lee's title and opening number, Chiang wrote Beauty World, which toured internationally. Like Army Daze, it has been restaged a number of times, including a made-for-television version in 1998. It will be restaged in November 2015 at the Victoria Theatre, with Lee directing the musical.

As the editorial director of Mediacorp Publishing, Chiang popularised the trend of putting celebrities on magazine covers. At the height of his publishing career, Chiang was running more than 20 magazine titles.

In July 2013, Chiang returned to the stage with his first production in 14 years, High Class, which was staged at the Drama Centre Theatre, followed by a rerun of Army Daze. Chiang also wrote the screenplay for Our Sister Mambo which was released in July 2015 to celebrate Cathay Organisation's 80th anniversary.

In October 2014, Chiang began his stint as editorial director of The A List, the National Arts Council's fortnightly arts magazine.

== Works by Michael Chiang ==
=== Plays ===
- Jun 1984: Beauty Box (short)
- Sep 1985: Love & Belachan (short)
- Jun 1987: Army Daze
- Jun 1988: Beauty World
- Jun 1989: Mixed Signals
- Jun 1992: Private Parts
- Apr 1994: Heaven II
- Oct 1995: My Art Belongs to Me
- Nov 1995: Mortal Sins
- Dec 1999: My Lonely Tarts
- Jul 2013: High Class

=== Screenplays ===
- Army Daze (1996)
- Our Sister Mambo (2015)

=== Publications ===
- Army Daze (1985, Times Books International) ISBN 9971652250
- Michael Chiang's Army Daze: The Play (1987, Landmark Books) ISBN 9813002123
- The New Army Daze (1992, Times Books International) ISBN 981204308X
- Private Parts & Other Playthings: A Collection of Popular Singapore Comedies (1994, Landmark Books) ISBN 9813002778
- Play Things: The Complete Works 1984-2014 (2014, Really Good Books) ISBN 978-981-09-2035-7

=== Anthologies ===
- Gwee Li Sui, ed. Written Country: The History of Singapore through Literature (2016, Landmark Publications) ISBN 9789814189668
