= Beauty World =

Beauty World may refer to:

- Beauty World (musical), a 1988 Singaporean musical
- Beauty World (TV series), a 2011 Chinese television series
- Beauty World MRT station, a rapid transit station in Singapore
