= Dick Lee =

Singaporean singer-songwriter, playwright, film director (born 1956)

- 李炳文
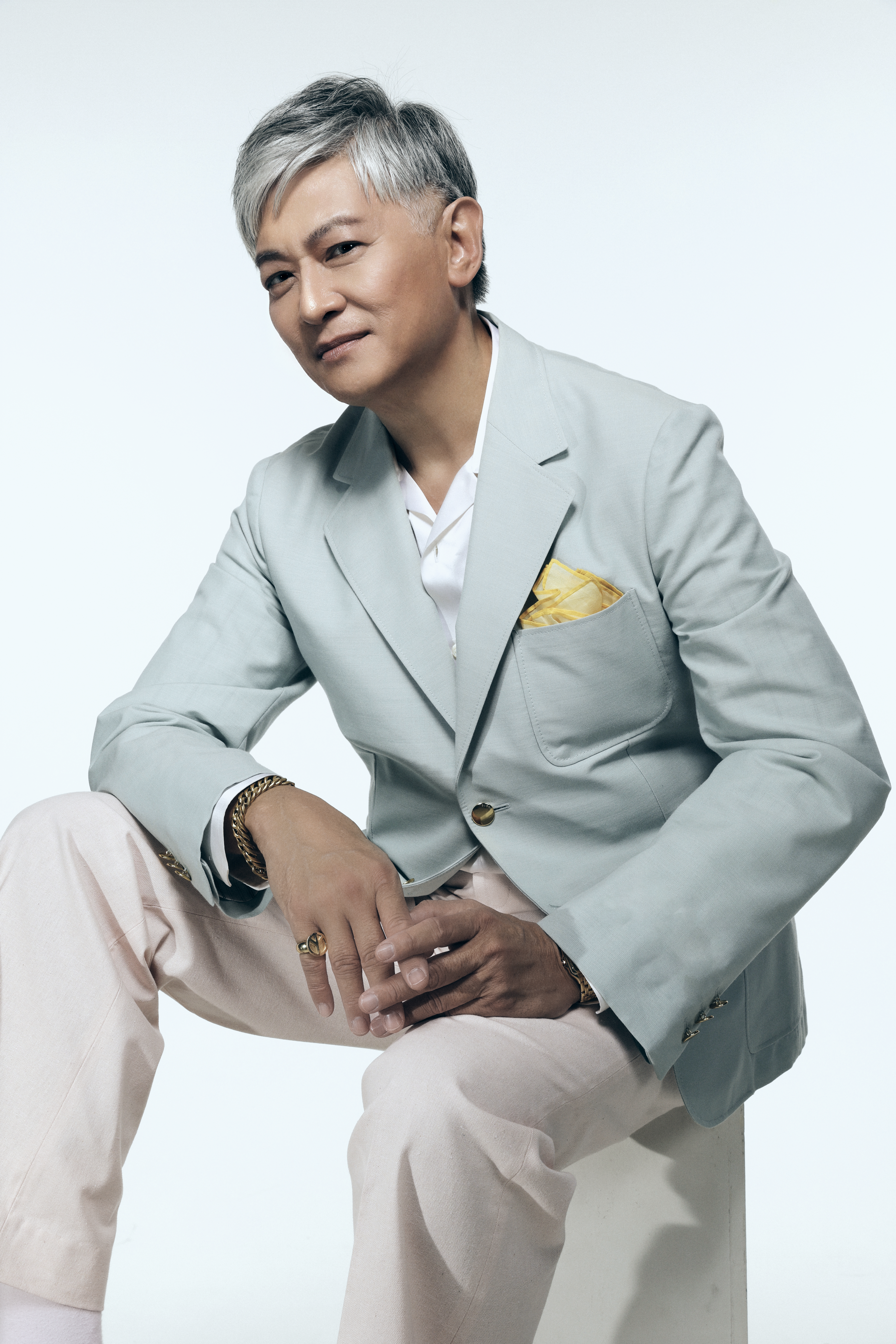
- Lee in 2023
- Born: Richard Lee Peng Boon; 24 August 1956; Singapore
- Education: Harrow School of Art
- Occupations: Singer-songwriter; playwright; film director
- Years active: 1971–present
- Spouse: Jacintha Abisheganaden (m. 1992; div. 1997)
- Awards: Cultural Medallion
- Musical career
- Genres: Pop music, Cantopop, musical theatre
- Instrument: Piano

Chinese name
- Chinese: 李炳文
Transcriptions
Standard Mandarin
- Hanyu Pinyin: Lǐ Bǐngwén
Yue: Cantonese
- Jyutping: lei5 di2 man4
- Website: dickleeasia.com

Dick Lee (born Richard Lee Peng Boon; 24 August 1956) is a Singaporean singer-songwriter, playwright and film director. Lee was awarded the Cultural Medallion, Singapore's pinnacle arts award, for music in 2005.

== Early life ==
Lee was born to a Peranakan father, Lee Kip Lee, (who wrote for The Straits Times) and his wife, Elizabeth Tan. He was the eldest child in the family of five, with three brothers and a sister (now deceased). He received his early education at St. Michael's School (now SJI Junior) and his secondary education at St. Joseph's Institution.

== Musical career ==
=== Early years ===
Lee started his career in 1971 at the age of fifteen when he joined the group Harmony as a pianist and participated in several talent contests with the group. He soon left the group and formed his own group, Dick and the Gang, with his brothers. He would performed on stage both as a group or on his own. His first album, Life Story, featuring his own compositions, was released in 1974.

Throughout the 70s and 80s, Lee championed the use of Asian elements in pop music. His pioneering album, Life in the Lion City (1984), won acclaim. But the album that achieved regional prominence for him was The Mad Chinaman, released in 1989,

Lee won several awards in Singapore, Hong Kong and Japan for these early artistic efforts.

In addition to his recordings, in 1983, he co-produced and contributed keyboards to Zircon Lounge's debut album Regal Vigour.

=== 1990s ===
In 1990, Lee moved to Japan where he continued to develop the new Asian identity through his solo work, as well as collaborations with top Asian artistes such as Tracy Huang, Sandy Lam and Japanese group Zoo. He has written numerous songs for top singing talents in Asia.

Transit Lounge, released by Sony, won both critical and music lovers' praise during the same time that he was regional vice-president of Artiste and Repertoire for Sony Music Asia, based in Hong Kong from 1998 to 2000. Everything, released in November 2000 also by Sony Music, features a collection of his works written since the 1970s. In December 2001, Lee and his friend Leonard T contributed a song to a charity CD – Love Is The Answer For Kids With Aids, KK Outreach for Kids Fund. The song "It All Begins With Love" is aired frequently on Singapore's radio stations.

Lee has written many staged musicals including Beauty World (1988), Fried Rice Paradise (1991), Kampong Amber (1994), Sing to the Dawn (1996), Hotpants (1997), Jacky Cheung's acclaimed Snow.Wolf.Lake (1997), Nagraland (1992), Puteri Gunung Ledang (2006) and P. Ramlee (2007). Since 1998, Lee has been the Associate Artiste Director of the Singapore Repertory Theatre.

=== 2000s ===
In 2000, Lee composed the songs for the musical version of the sitcom Phua Chu Kang, produced for the Singapore President's Star Charity Drive and broadcast by Television Corporation of Singapore (TCS). The musical raised over a record-setting $2 million. In November of that year, he left his job at Sony Music in Hong Kong and was appointed creative director at SPH MediaWorks effective February 2001. Under his new job, he penned the theme songs to Paradise and Ah Girl and the inaugural channel musical TV Land, for which he wrote two songs.

In 2002, he wrote and co-directed his first dance musical re:MIX for the Singapore Repertory Theatre Young Company (SRT Young Company), and that same year wrote a commissioned work, Forbidden City: Portrait of An Empress, one of the highlights of the October opening festival of Singapore's prestigious new cultural centre, The Esplanade - Theatres on the Bay. The production was a popular re-run in September 2003 and again in 2006. It was directed by Steven Dexter and was scheduled to go on a world tour in 2008, with the first stop being London's West End.

Lee was appointed the Creative Director for Singapore's 2002 National Day Parade. Coincidentally, his song "We Will Get There" was selected to be 2002 theme song for the parade. Stefanie Sun performed the song and also included it in her own top-selling album. This was his second National Day theme song, having written "Home", performed by Kit Chan, in 1998.

In 2003, he penned the English lyrics of "Treasure The World", the image song of J-ASEAN campaign by The Japan Foundation. Artistes from Japan and 10 ASEAN countries recorded this song for the campaign in English and their respective native languages. In July 2003, Lee was awarded the Fukuoka Arts and Culture Prize, an award by the Fukuoka Asian Culture Prize committee to recognise an individual's substantial contributions to the arts scene in Asia.

Lee wrote an autobiography, The Adventures of the Mad Chinaman, in 2004.

In 2004, he appeared on Singapore Idol as a judge alongside fellow Singaporeans Florence Lian and Ken Lim. He returned as a judge for the second and third seasons in 2006 and 2009.

On 17 and 18 December 2004, Lee held a 30th anniversary concert, titled Life Stories at the Kallang Theatre. Guest stars included Singapore Idol winner Taufik Batisah and runner up Sylvester Sim, Kumar, ex-wife Jacintha, Koh Chieng Mun, Hossan Leong, and others.

In 2005, Lee was awarded the Cultural Medallion for music.

In 2009, he penned the theme song for the APEC Singapore 2009 summit which was performed in front of world leaders such as Barack Obama by Kit Chan during the Singapore Evening at the APEC Singapore 2009 summit on 14 November 2009 at the Esplanade – Theatres on the Bay. He was also the director of the 30-minute musical extravaganza involving 376 Singaporean artistes in a concert extravaganza enhanced by multimedia projections.

In 2010, Lee was the Creative Director of Singapore's 44th National Day Parade.

In 2011, Lee returned with The Adventures of the Mad China man, a concert, and Beauty Kings, an original comedy play.

In 2012, Lee also performed — and was a character — in TheatreWorks’ National Broadway Company production for the Esplanade - Theatres on the Bay's 10th anniversary celebrations.

In 2013, Lee returned to musicals by composing the 90-minute LightSeeker, which premiered at Resorts World Sentosa. He was also named a Steinway Artist and became Creative Director of the revamped Rediffusion Singapore radio station.He also co-wrote the song ¨Chase Again¨.

In 2014, Lee held a concert, Dick Lee: Celebrating 40 Years In Music, at the Drama Centre. In the same year, a revamped version of his 1997 musical Hotpants was restaged. After his third stint as National Day Parade's Creative Director, Lee will return to helm 2015's golden jubilee show; and he has been tasked to write the next big National Day song.

In 2015, Lee was the creative director of Singapore 50th National Day Parade, where he composed the NDP theme song "Our Singapore", performed by JJ Lin.

In 2017, Lee made his directorial debut with the autobiographical musical film, Wonder Boy.

== Fashion career ==
Having studied fashion design at Harrow School of Art in London, Lee's interest in fashion began at 16 when he designed for his mother's boutique Midteen.

He designed his own labels for his boutique Ping Pong, as well as for Hemispheres, the first young designer store he set up with a partner.

Other forays in the fashion world include Display Director for Tangs departmental store in 1984, fashion editor of Female magazine in 1986 and one of the founders of the Society of Designing Arts, which spearheaded the introduction of Singapore designers to the local fashion market.

From 1982 to 1990, Lee also ran his own event company Runway Productions, which specialised in fashion and tourism events.

Lee chaired the 2011 Audi Fashion Festival, and in 2014, he was named brand ambassador for Audi Singapore.

== Business career ==
In 1991, Lee created the Boom Boom Room, a drag cabaret venue at Bugis Street, featuring drag comedian Kumar and other drag queens. In 2000, Boom Boom Room moved to Far East Square when Bugis Street underwent redevelopment. It closed eventually in 2004. In 2021, Lee recreated the Boom Boom Room for a limited run at Marina Bay Sands' Sands Expo and Convention Centre in Singapore.

In 2012, Lee opened MAD (Modern Asian Diner) in Singapore. It is a 5-way partnership with 4 other homegrown local companies namely Tung Lok group, Bakerzin, Bar Stories and Top Wines at The Grandstand located at Bukit Timah, Singapore. It closed in March 2014. Lee opened pancake joint Slappy Cakes, another joint venture by Lee, in a portion of the original space used by MAD.

== Personal life ==
Lee is a Catholic. In 1992, Lee married jazz singer Jacintha Abisheganaden. They divorced in 1997.

== Discography ==
=== On Vinyl ===
Year	Title	Album details
1974	LIFE STORY	Philips
1984	LIFE IN THE LION CITY	WEA
1984	SURIRAM	Single – WEA
1985	RETURN TO BEAUTY WORLD	WEA
1986	SONGS FROM LONG AGO	WEA
1986	SONGS OF CHRISTMAS	WEA
1986	FRIED RICE PARADISE	Compilation - WEA
1987	CONNECTIONS	WEA

=== On CD ===
Year	Title	Album details
1989	THE MAD CHINAMAN	WEA
1990	ASIA MAJOR	WEA JAPAN
1991	ORIENTALISM	WEA JAPAN
1992	THE YEAR OF THE MONKEY	WEA JAPAN
1993	HONG KONG RHAPSODY	WEA JAPAN
1993	PEACE LIFE LOVE	WEA JAPAN
1994	LIFE STORY	Compilation – WEA JAPAN
1994	COMPASS	WEA HK
1995	SECRET ISLAND	For Life Records Japan
1996	SINGAPOP	For Life Records Japan
1999	TRANSIT LOUNGE	Sony Music
2000	EVERYTHING	Sony Music
2003	RICE	Yellow Music
2010	LOVE DELUXE	Warner Music

=== Online ===
Year	Title	Album details
2016	RASA SAYANG feat. Shigga Shay	Single - DLA
2016	BITTERSWEET	EP - mm2
2018	WONDER BOY	EP – DLA
2021	ENOUGH FOR ME feat. Omnitones	Single – DLA
2022	LOVE IS REAL feat. Omnitones	Single – DLA
2023	GO YOUR WAY	Single – FRP
2024	THE ONLY WAY feat. Uriah See	Single – FRP
2024	YES OR NO feat. Omnitones	Single – FRP
2024	THIS OLD WORLD	Single – FRP

== Theatrical works ==
=== Musical ===
Year	Title	Locations
1988	Beauty World	Singapore
1991	Fried Rice Paradise	Singapore
1992	Nagaraland	Japan, Hong Kong, Singapore
1992	Beauty World	Singapore, Japan
1993	Hong Kong Rhapsody	Japan
1994	FANTASIA	JAPAN
1994	KAMPONG AMBER	SINGAPORE
1995	MORTAL SINS	SINGAPORE
1996	SING TO THE DAWN	SINGAPORE
1997	A TWIST OF FATE	SINGAPORE
1997	HOTPANTS	SINGAPORE
1997	SNOW.WOLF.LAKE	HONG KONG
1998	Beauty World	Singapore/Television special
1998	SNOW.WOLF.LAKE	SINGAPORE
2001	TV Land	Singapore/Television special
2002	FORBIDDEN CITY	SINGAPORE
2005	A TWIST OF FATE	SINGAPORE
2005	PHUA CHU KANG	SINGAPORE/TELEVISION SPECIAL
2006	MAN OF LETTERS	SINGAPORE
2006	PUTERI GUNUNG LEDANG	MALAYSIA, SINGAPORE
2006	FORBIDDEN CITY	SINGAPORE
2006	SNOW.WOLF.LAKE	CHINA
2007	P.RAMLEE THE MUSICAL	MALAYSIA, SINGAPORE
2008	BEAUTY WORLD	SINGAPORE
2009	PUTERI GUNUNG LEDANG	MALAYSIA
2010	FRIED RICE PARADISE	SINGAPORE
2014	HOTPANTS	
2015	LKY THE MUSICAL	SINGAPORE
2015	BEAUTY WORLD	
2017	FORBIDDEN CITY	SINGAPORE
2019	FRIED RICE PARADISE	SINGAPORE/TELEVISION SERIES
2022	LKY THE MUSICAL	SINGAPORE

=== Plays ===
Year	Title	Locations
1997	DEATH IN TUAS	SINGAPORE
2004	THE GOOD CITIZEN	SINGAPORE
2014	RISING SON	SINGAPORE

== Awards ==
Year	Award
1995	The Perfect 10 Music Achievement Award for outstanding contribution in the Singapore music scene Hong Kong Film Award for Best Original Film Song for "The Search of My Life", the theme song for the film He's a Woman, She's a Man
1998	Composers and Authors Society of Singapore (Compass) Awards for Top Local English Pop Song and Top Local Composer of the Year
1999	Hong Kong Film Award for Best Original Film Song for the theme song of City of Glass Compass Awards for Artiste Excellence, Top Local Chinese Pop Song and Top Local Composer of the Year
2000	Compass Award for Top Local Composer of the Year
2001	Compass Award for Top Local Composer of the Year
2003	Fukuoka Asian Culture Awards: Arts Award
2004	Compass Award for Best Malay Pop Song
2005	Cultural Medallion Award
2006	Compass Award for Top Local Composer of the Year
2009	Compass Award Wings Of Excellence
2013	Compass Award for Top Local English Pop Song ("Home")
2017	Compass Lifetime Achievement Award
2022	Compass Award for Top Local English Song (with JJ Lin)
