= Army Daze =

1996 Singaporean film by Ong Keng Sen

- Theatrical poster
- Directed by: Ong Keng Sen
- Screenplay by: Michael Chiang
- Starring: Edward Yong Ching Tah; Sheikh Haikel; Kevin Mark Verghese; Adrian Lim Meng Kiat; Ahamed Azad
- Distributed by: Cathay Asia Films
- Release date: 21 November 1996
- Running time: 85 minutes
- Country: Singapore
- Language: English
- Budget: S$700,000
- Box office: S$1,600,000

Army Daze is a 1996 Singaporean comedy film based on the 1987 theatre play of the same name by Singaporean writer Michael Chiang. Directed by Ong Keng Sen and distributed by Cathay Asia Films, the film portrays a group of 18-year-old Singaporean army recruits from different classes and cultural backgrounds as they perform their National Service in the Singapore Army. The movie is spoken in Singlish, Standard English, Malay, Hokkien and Mandarin.

A chief executive of Cathay Organisation, which produced its last film since 1973, saw the theatre play in 1995 and proposed to produce the film. Cathay decided to produce the film after the success of Singaporean films such as Bugis Street and Mee Pok Man. Production began the following year and was theatrically released on 21 November 1996.

== Plot ==
The film follows the journey of five Singaporean men from different backgrounds as they enlist in their National Service: Malcolm, a nerdy and sheltered Chinese from an upper-middle-class background; Johari, a fat laid-back hipster Malay and a fan of Deanna Yusoff; Krishna, a heroic Indian who was in the National Cadet Corps; Ah Beng, a delinquent ah beng who primarily speaks in Hokkien; and Kenny, an effeminate Eurasian interested in women's lifestyle. The story unfolds through Malcolm's perspective as he narrates his experiences in the army.

The men are assigned to Hotel Company Platoon 4, where they meet other recruits. Before enlisting, Malcolm interacts with a shady man named Mr. X, who sells him a guidebook on playing truant in the army. Krishna has a heartfelt conversation with his girlfriend, Lathi, before reporting to duty. At the camp, they bid farewell to their loved ones.

They are introduced to their drill instructor, Corporal Ong, who leads them to get their mandatory haircuts. The men introduce themselves to each other. Krishna also befriends Ah Beng after learning that Ah Beng has a cellphone and pager. The film shows the five men comically struggle in their physical drills and camoflauge training.

The recruits are allowed visits from their families, and Krishna reunites dramatically with Lathi. Ah Beng's younger sister, Ah Huay, makes an extravagant appearance, and Malcolm's overprotective mother expresses her disapproval of the army training. Johari feels neglected by his parents' absence, while Kenny dismisses his parents' absence as a holiday. The five men gather for a photo with Ah Huay as the photographer.

During bayonet training, they meet their strict instructor Sergeant Wendy Chung, who unknowingly captures Ah Beng's heart. The platoon goes on a field camp, where Kenny and Malcolm try to make their campsite more comfortable but end up being punished with guard duty by Sergeant Monteiro. Krishna also joins them after trying to feign an excuse for absence using Malcolm's guidebook to meet Lathi.

While on duty, Krishna faints after a scuffle with a python, and Malcolm finds him. Second Lieutenant Collin Heng decides to visit Krishna's family with CPL Ong and Malcolm. Lathi is comforted by 2LT Heng, and Malcolm notices a connection between them. After Krishna is discharged, he returns to an empty bunk, and finds out that the platoon has been given time off for outstanding performance. The four surprise Krishna, but tension arises when Kenny accuses Malcolm of witnessing Lathi flirting with 2LT Heng. Malcolm denies the claim, leading to an argument. Johari and Malcolm try to pacify Kenny, and Ah Beng advises Krishna against breaking up with Lathi.

Krishna and Lathi reconcile over a phone call, while Malcolm learns to stand up to his mother. The five men bond as their military training comes to an end, expressing their desired vocations. The training concludes with a successful route march. Upon graduating, the families of the five men come to pick them up, and they share their experiences and camaraderie. SGT Wendy Chung introduces her former schoolmate Deanna Yusoff. They take a final picture together.

In the end, Malcolm signs on with the army and becomes a Captain while pursuing his nerdy hobbies. Krishna becomes a lawyer and starts a family with Lathi, who becomes famous. Johari joins the media industry and fulfills his dream of working with Deanna. Kenny enters boutique sales and aspires to become a dance choreographer, while Ah Beng becomes a cellphone manager, strikes the lottery, and buys a diamond ring for SGT Wendy Chung.

== Cast ==
- Edward Yong Ching Tah as REC Malcolm Png
- Sheikh Haikel as REC Johari Salleh
- Ahamed Azad as REC Krishnamoorthy
- Adrian Lim Meng Kiat as REC Teo Ah Beng
- Kevin Mark Verghese as REC Kenny Pereira
- Margaret Chan as Mrs. Png, Malcolm's mother
- Jacintha Charles as Lathi
- Eileen Wee Ling Yin as Teo Ah Huay
- Daniel Gan Wei Teck as CPL Ong, the platoon's section commander
- Rajagopal Kesavadas as 3SG Monteiro, the platoon sergeant
- Elaine Li Hoon Cheah as 3SG Wendy Chung
- Julian Jay Huang as 2LT Collin Heng, the platoon commander
- Lim Kay Tong as CPT Lim, CPL Ong's superior officer
- Ong Chuen Boone as Mr X.
- Deanna Yusoff as herself

== Production ==
Army Daze is an adaption of a 1987 popular eponymous play written by Michael Chiang, which is based on the 1985 fiction book of the same name that he also wrote; it is also the film directorial debut of Ong Keng Sen, the artistic director of TheatreWorks. TheatreWorks had staged Army Daze in 1987, 1990, and in 1995. Cathay Organisation's chief executive Meileen Choo saw a performance of the play in 1995 and found it viable for a film adaptation with its subject of National Service. Moreover, according to a Cathay spokesperson, the success of Bugis Street and Mee Pok Man "has led [Cathay] to feel the time is right" to return to filmmaking. Cathay then formed Cathay Asia Films as a subsidiary company. The company planned to release one movie per year if Army Daze would be successful at the box office. Throughout the 1990s, the Singaporean film industry had largely produced films about serious topics, including Medium Rare (1992), co-production Bugis Street, and Mee Pok Man (both 1995). The film's distributor, Cathay, had also been out of the movie production business and made its last film in 1973.

Development for the film was first announced in February 1996. The film was planned for a mid-November release of the same year in Singapore and Malaysia, and a video release. Meileen Choo served as an executive producer. Chiang wrote the film script, which was reviewed by the Ministry of Defence (MINDEF), within eight days in Sydney during the Lunar New Year in 1996. Most of the production crew and cast were novices and Singaporean. Meanwhile, associate producer Brian Hong and photography director Yoke Weng Ho had previously worked on Eric Khoo's Mee Pok Man and were trained outside Singapore. Ong admitted that the burden he felt in directing Army Daze was "a bit scary", noting that the film had to meet financial expectations, and satisfy military servicemen and people who had seen the play.

The film was made with a budget of S$700,000, which was initially around S$500,000. Filming locations include Nee Soon Camp, as well as training camps in Lim Chu Kang, Lentor Avenue, and Lorong Gambas. Production was supported by MINDEF, which provided at least 100 extras for a final scene where soldiers do a route march. Filming took five weeks, and wrapped up on 8 July, three days ahead of schedule. Most of the lead cast were in fulltime national service during filming, except for first-year National University of Singapore undergraduate Azad.

== Release ==
A release date of 21 November 1996 for Singapore was announced at August of the same year. A charity premiere of Army Daze was held on 6 November at The Picturehouse; the premiere's proceeds would be for the National Arts Council. Among the audience was Minister for Information and the Arts George Yeo. Sneak previews began on 15 November. On 21 November, it was screened on 15 cinemas throughout Singapore. The film earned S$500,000 in the box office and sneak previews four days afterward. In January 1997, it had a box office of around S$1.6 million. The film was screened for around 42 days in Singapore.

According to an announcement by Cathay, Army Daze was planned to be submitted for the 47th Berlin International Film Festival and the 1997 San Francisco International Asian American Film Festival. In January 1997, Cathay Asia Films announced a theatrical release in Malaysia on March 1997. The Straits Times also reported that the film, alongside 12 Storeys and The Road Less Travelled, would be screened at the first East Asia Film & Television Festival in Penang from 27 August to 3 September 1997.

== Home media ==
Video, VCD, and LaserDisc versions of the film were released by Warner Home Video before 1997. A 15th anniversary DVD edition of the film was released in August 2011. Digital remastering of the film from 35 mm format started in late 2011 and took more than a year. The remaster received a limited re-release in March 2013.
