= Sreejith Ramanan =

Indian actor (born 1977)

Dr.Sreejith Ramanan
- From a public talk
- Born: Sreejith Ramanan; 9 November 1977 (age 48); Kollam, Kerala, India
- Education: University of Calicut School of Drama and Fine Arts, Sarojini Naidu School of Arts & Communication-University of Hydrabad, Mahathma Gandhi University -school of Letters, Intercultural Theatre Institute, Singapore
- Occupations: Theatre director; Actor; Theatre maker; Theatre actor trainer; Theatre researcher; Stage, sound & Light designer
- Years active: 1997–present
- Title: Master of Philosophy in Theatre
- Spouse: Anitha Sreejith
- Awards: Kerala Sangeetha Nataka Akademy Award for Best Actor, Government of India scholarship for young artist, G. Sankara Pillai award for 1st rank in school of drama

Sreejith Ramanan is an Indian contemporary theatre director, actor, theatre maker, researcher and theatre-trainer who has been described by the media as "a versatile Indian contemporary theatre actor". Over the course of his wide-ranging career, he has also worked as a choreographer, stage designer, theatre technical director, Sound and Lighting designer. He is best known for his collaborations with cross-cultural theatrical adventures with notable numerous artists, theatre directors, including Hiroshi Koike, Dr Phillip B Zarrilli, Uichiro Fueda, Ram Gopal Bajaj, S.Ramanujam, Abhilash Pillai, Leela Alaniz, Kok Heng Leun and Terence Crawford

== Education ==
Bachelor of Theatre Arts with 1st RANK (Acting) from School of Drama(2001), University of Calicut Kerala, Master of Performing Arts (Theatre Arts) with 1st Class from the University of Hyderabad in 2003, Master of Philosophy in Theatre from Mahatma Gandhi University-School of Letters, Kerala and he has successfully completed higher education at Intercultural theatre institute formerly known as TTRP, Theatre Training & Research Programme in Singapore.

== Theatre Productions ==
More than 80 productions in India, Japan, Singapore, Indonesia and Malaysia

Year	Production	Role	Language	Notes
2015	Mahabharata Pan-Asian	Actor/Collaborator	Multi-lingual	Performances in various cities in India and South-east Asia
2016	Misty Mountains of Mahabharatha	Director/Conception	Malayalam	For the Calicut University School of Drama and Fine Arts, performed at the open air stage of School of Drama campus, Thrissur, Kerala, South India

== Awards and honours ==
- 2003: Kerala Sangeeta Nataka Academy award for Best Actor for Chayamukhi directed by Prasant Narayanan
- 2002-2004: Government of India, Ministry of Human Resource Development, Department of Culture's Scholarship For Young Artist
- 2001: G. Sankara Pillai Endowment Award for securing 1st Rank in School of Drama, Kerala

== Films ==
Yakusha Co. Ltd is a movie spanning cultural boundaries of Asia both in the range of collaborators and depiction of thematic. A Zero budget production, ‘Yakusha Co. Ltd’ uses tradition of South East Asia in its cultural narrative. In this production, actors from Japanese instrumental acting background and the modern camera eyes from the Singapore blended with the director Sreejith Ramanan and narrative from younger generation of Indian dramatic and literary heritage. The narrative forms a cultural landscape through the layers of performing arts and the ethos of artistic mindset. The film was premiered at the inaugural Asian Intercultural Conference (2008) organized by Theatre training and research programme in collaboration with the National University of Singapore, Theatre studies programme in Singapore. It was selected to Swaralaya International film festival and Sreejith Ramanan has won the Award for Best Director, citation presented by the fifth Swaralaya International Film Festival, Kerala in 2008

== See also ==
- Dramaturgy
