= Chew Kheng Chuan =

Singaporean fundraiser charged as a Marxist

- 周庆全
- Born: 1956 or 1957 (age 69–70)
- Education: Harvard College (A.B.)
- Relatives: Chew Boon Lay (great-grandfather)

Chew Kheng Chuan (Chinese: 周庆全; born 1957), also known as KC Chew, is a Singaporean fundraiser. The first Singaporean admitted to Harvard College, he is known for pioneering fundraising in Southeast Asia and for his involvement in Operation Spectrum in 1987. From 2000 to 2021, he was Chairman of The Substation, an arts centre in Singapore founded by the playwright Kuo Pao Kun.

== Early life, education and career ==
Chew enrolled in Anglo-Chinese School (Junior) in 1964, in a batch of students that included Andrew Phang, V.K. Rajah and Tharman Shanmugaratnam. Chew developed an early interest in Singapore politics, and became good friends with Shanmugaratnam in school. In 1978, Chew became the first Singaporean to be admitted to Harvard College. He graduated with an AB cum laude in Social Studies in 1982. Since 1983, he has served as Chairman of the Harvard Alumni Interviewing Committee in Singapore.

Chew drew attention for his ability as a fundraiser. Between 2009 and 2012, he worked at the Nanyang Technological University, during which the University received its single largest gift ever. With the enhanced matching from the Singapore Government, the sum came up to nearly S$400 million, making it the largest private donation ever given to an educational cause in Singapore. Before that, Chew worked for the National University of Singapore, raising S$1.5 billion under his tenure, more than four times what it had raised in the previous 12 years.

== Operation Spectrum ==
KC Chew is a former Amnesty International Prisoner of Conscience. In 1987, he was one of 22 persons arrested under Singapore's Internal Security Act, on the grounds that they were members of a clandestine communist-front network. The head of the group was said to be Vincent Cheng, a Catholic lay worker.

Detainees under Operation Spectrum were accused by Singapore's Ministry of Home Affairs of planning to “subvert the existing social and political system in Singapore through communist united front tactics to establish a communist state.” By the end of 1987, all but one of the detainees had been released, subject to restrictions on their freedom of movement. In April 1988, eight were re-arrested, following their publication of a signed public statement denying the accusations against them and alleging mistreatment in detention. Chew, who was not among the signatories but had allegedly helped edit, print and distribute the statement, was also re-arrested separately. Most of the detainees were subsequently released in stages in late 1988 and throughout 1989, after signing statutory declarations (while in custody) recanting earlier allegations. Chew has steadfastly denied being a Marxist, and refuted all allegations that he was involved in a conspiracy against the government.

Chew, in a statement before the Internal Security Act Advisory Board after 12 weeks of detention, declared: “I am a democrat, a believer in an open and democratic polity and in the virtues of an open and accountable government ... A citizen of a democracy, to be worthy of that society, has not just the right, but indeed the duty to participate in the political life of his or her society.”

== Personal life ==
His great-grandfather was the Singaporean immigrant and pioneer Chew Boon Lay, after whom the Boon Lay area of Singapore is named. In 2002, Chew co-authored and edited Chew Boon Lay: A Family Traces its History, a multifaceted work that combines a biography of Chew Boon Lay with an exploration of the contributions made by his family to the region.
