= Chase Again =

Song is written by Dick Lee and Albert Leung

Chase Again (一追再追) is the theme song to “The Revertible End” (本可改變的結局). The song is written by Dick Lee and Albert Leung (林夕) who spent over 1 year time in its planning and creating, completing it in 2013. It is performed by Sammi Cheng (鄭秀文). “Chase Again” was written as a sequel to Leslie Cheung’s (張國榮) “Chase” (追), the theme song to “He's a Woman, She's a Man” (金枝玉葉), written in 1993 by Dick Lee and Lin Xin. The music video also pays homage to Leslie, as it was shot just outside Central District’s Mandarin Oriental, the very hotel where Leslie had taken his life. Sammi, like Leslie, suffered from depression in the past and has a very personal connection to the song. During a press interview, she stated that she did the song for FamilyLink, that she too suffered from depression for over three years. Because of this, she feels greater emotions when performing “Chase Again”. She also stated that though the song is a sequel to Leslie’s “Chase”. The only thing she wishes is to bring hope to those affected by the disease.

== Song ==
Chase Again 《一追再追》 - The theme song of《“The Revertible End” (本可改變的結局) ＊ Melody composed by：Dick Lee ＊ Lyrics written by：Lin Xin 林夕 ＊ Music arrangement by: Lau Chi Yuen 劉志遠 ＊ Singer: Sammi Cheng 鄭秀文

== Official Website ==
- https://web.archive.org/web/20150925231442/http://mooddisorder.hk/ http://www.mooddisorder.hk

== External News Links ==
- yahoonews-hk
- sinanews
- MingPao
- yahoonews
- Oriental Daily
- Headline Daily News
- Weibo
- MingPao
- MingPao
- 星島日報: SingTao
- Apple Daily News
- SingPao
- HK Daily News
- WenWeiPo
- 東方即時: on.cc
- 蘋果即時: Apple VNews
