= Jacintha Abisheganaden =

Singaporean singer & actress (born 1957)

- Born: 3 October 1957 (age 68); Colony of Singapore
- Other name: Jacintha
- Education: Raffles Institution; National University of Singapore; Harvard University
- Occupations: Singer, songwriter, actress
- Years active: 1976–present
- Spouse(s): David Scheffer (m. 1983; div. 1986) Dick Lee (m. 1992; div. 1997) Koh Boon Pin (m. 1998; div. 2008)
- Children: 1
- Parents: Alex Abisheganaden (father); Eileen Wong (mother)
- Musical career
- Genres: Jazz, bossa nova

Jacintha Abisheganaden (born 3 October 1957), known professionally as Jacintha, is a Singaporean singer, actress, and theater practitioner who studied at the National University of Singapore and received a degree in arts, majoring in English literature. She is a founding member of the performance company TheatreWorks.

== Early life ==
Abisheganaden was born in 1957 to mixed-race Singaporean musician parents, namely a Ceylonese-origin Indian classical guitarist cum music teacher, Alex Abisheganaden (1926–2023), a recipient of the Cultural Medallion and a Chinese mother of Cantonese descent, Eileen Wong (born 1928) who was a pianist and also an arts teacher. She studied piano and voice from her early teens and also sang in the Singapore Youth Choir where she met her future collaborator, Dick Lee. Growing up, Abisheganaden listened to a wide variety of music, not only vocal jazz and traditional pop but also artists who ranged from Stevie Wonder to Joni Mitchell to South African singer Miriam Makeba. Abisheganaden was a big fan of Brazilian bandleader Sergio Mendes during her upbringing and she has been quoted as saying that she was "obsessed" with Barbra Streisand.

Abisheganaden was educated at Marymount Convent School, Raffles Institution and the National University of Singapore, where she graduated with an honours degree in English. She then went to America where she studied creative writing at Harvard University.

== Career ==
Abisheganaden first came to prominence in 1976 when she won a local television talent contest, Talentime, singing jazz. She continued this winning streak in 1981, when she nabbed the Best Female Performer award for her role as Nurse Angamuthu in General Hospital at the Drama Festival.

In 1982, she worked as an arts reporter for The Straits Times, interviewing figures like Neil Sedaka, Cliff Richards and Sophia Loren. In 1982, she acted as Pala in Samseng and the Chettiar's Daughter, a Singapore Arts Festival production directed by John Tasker. She also acted in the Experimental Theatre Club's Terry Rex for the 1982 Singapore Drama Festival. In 1983, Abisheganaden released her debut album Silence on WEA, on which Dick Lee wrote nine out of the ten songs. The new wave album, containing a cover of the Bee Gees' "Run to Me", was reviewed positively, with The Straits Times calling it "probably the most impressive debut album...from a local singer." In the same year, Abisheganaden acted in the Experimental Theatre Club's production of Susan's Party, directed by Lim Siauw Chong, for the Drama Festival. In 1984, Abisheganaden starred in Dick Lee's play Bumboat—the title song, featuring the cast, was released as a record, with "Unsaid", a duet between Lee and Abisheganaden on the flipside. In 1985, Abisheganaden returned from the States temporarily (where she moved with her husband) to act in TheatreWorks' Love and Belacan, three playlets co-starring Lim Kay Tong. In 1986, Abisheganaden returned from the States permanently to record her second album, and played a series of live jazz shows at The Saxophone. In the same year, she sang and acted in Singapore Broadcasting Corporation's hour-long programme Destination Mauritius. In 1987, Abisheganaden was voted Best Performer at the fourth ASEAN Song Festival and released her second album Tropicana. She also acted as Zemphira in The Gypsies—The Tragedy of Zemphira, directed by William Teo. In 1988, she performed in TheatreWorks' musical Beauty World and acted as singer Josephine in Pam Gems' Piaf. In the same year, she was Singapore's representative at the Pax Musica cultural entertainment show in Singapore. In 1989, Abisheganaden and Dick Lee represented Singapore at the Asia Song Festival in Japan. She performed "Come Back to Me Tonight", which Lee composed for the event. In the same year, she acted in TheatreWorks' Mixed Signals, a three-act comedy written by Michael Chiang, and Jackson on a Jaunt by Eleanor Wong, staged as part of the double bill Safe Sex. She also performed with the New York Philharmonic, conducted by Zubin Mehta.

In 1990, Abisheganaden acted as Sheila Rani in TheatreWorks' revival of Lim Chor Pee's play, Mimi Fan. In 1991, Abisheganaden acted in Eric Khoo's short film August as an adulterous wife and released her third album Dramamama on Japan's Wave Records. In the same year, she starred in TheatreWorks' Fried Rice Paradise and Theatre Games. In 1992, Abisheganaden starred in Dick Lee's first Asian operetta, Nagaland, which performed to full houses in Japan, Hong Kong and Singapore. In 1993, Abisheganaden sang the lead role of Grizabella in Cats when the hit musical opened in Singapore. In the same year, she hosted the cooking show, Mum's Not Cooking. In 1997, Abisheganaden starred in Dick Lee's musical Hotpants, which was restaged in 2014.

In the mid-nineties, actor Lim Kay Tong introduced Abisheganaden to Ying Tan, who signed her to his Groove Note label. Her first jazz album was released in 1998: Here's To Ben – A Vocal Tribute To Ben Webster. Abisheganaden's second album for the Groove Note label, Autumn Leaves: The Songs of Johnny Mercer (1999) has seen the title track being used for the TV series Alias, while the bonus track "Here's to Life" was used as the title track for the Hollywood movie Play It to the Bone, as well as being used during Michael J. Fox's narration of ABC Sports' coverage Game 7 of the 2001 Stanley Cup Final. She has since recorded several jazz albums under the Groove Note label, including "Lush Life" (2002), "Jacintha is Her Name" (2003), "The Girl from Bossa Nova" (2004), and "Jacintha Goes to Hollywood" (2007). The retrospective collection "Best of Jacintha" was released in 2008.

In 2004, Abisheganaden performed her own cabaret jazz show, The Angina Monologues at the Old Parliament House, Singapore. In 2006, Abisheganaden served as a judge on the second season of Singapore Idol. In 2012, Abisheganaden returned to the stage after 13 years, playing herself in Ong Keng Sen's National Broadway Company, a musical commissioned for the Esplanade – Theatres on the Bay's 10th anniversary. In 2026, Abisheganaden collaborated with Ong and Dick Lee on a biographical theatre work, Lush Life, for the Singapore International Festival of Arts.

== Personal life ==
In 1983, Abisheganaden married an American lawyer, David Scheffer. They separated after three years.

In June 1992, Abisheganaden married her close collaborator, the singer-songwriter Dick Lee. The couple divorced in 1997.

In May 1998, Abisheganaden married former The Straits Times journalist Koh Boon Pin in Bali. The couple, who have a son, Alexander, divorced in 2008.

== Discography ==
- Silence (WEA, 1983)
- Tropicana (WEA, 1987)
- Dramamama (Sony, 1991)
- My Life (Springroll, 1997)
- Here's to Ben: A Vocal Tribute to Ben Webster (Groove Note, 1998)
- Autumn Leaves: The Songs of Johnny Mercer (Groove Note, 1999)
- Lush Life (Groove Note, 2001)
- Jacintha Is Her Name (Groove Note, 2003)
- The Girl from Bossa Nova (Groove Note, 2004)
- Love Flows Like a River (Harmony, 2005)
- Jacintha Goes to Hollywood (Groove Note, 2007)
- Best of Jacintha (Groove Note, 2008)
- Fire & Rain (Groove Note, 2018)

== See also ==
- Chindian
