= Rajesh Sreenivasan =

Singaporean lawyer

Rajesh Sreenivasan (Malayalam: രാജേഷ്‌ ശ്രീനിവാസന്‍, Tamil: ராஜேஷ் ஸ்ரீனிவாசன்; born 23 November 1969) is a lawyer based in Singapore.

== Career ==
He is an equity partner with Rajah & Tann where he also heads the technology, media and telecommunications practice. He specializes in matters relating to telecommunications, electronic commerce, IT contracts, digital forensics and digital media.

Rajesh has previously advised CIMB Bank on an agreement for the US$364 million development and implementation of a unified regional core banking platform, acted for Encompass Digital Media on its US$113 million acquisition of Ascent Media Corporation's global content distribution business, and advised on the world's first national electric vehicle charging infrastructure. Other clients include Amazon Web Services and Salon Films.

On the international front, Rajesh has advised infocommunications regulators and government departments of Canada, Brunei, Lesotho, Mongolia and Fiji on information and communications technology and other legal reforms. He has additionally worked with the World Bank and the ASEAN Secretariat on regional legal and regulatory projects.

In September 2011, his team won a tender to advise the Government of Brunei Darussalam on a review of its telecommunications regulatory framework, which would govern changes in the industry over the following five years.

Rajesh graduated with honours in law from Cardiff University in 1992.

On 1 November 2016, Rajesh was appointed as one of the new directors on Mediacorp's board. In addition, he had also served on the School Management Committee in Montfort since Jan 2016.

== Personal life ==
Rajesh Sreenivasan was born and brought up in Singapore. He enjoys travelling, music, photography. He is married and has three children.
