= T. Sasitharan =

Singaporean theatre educator (born 1958)

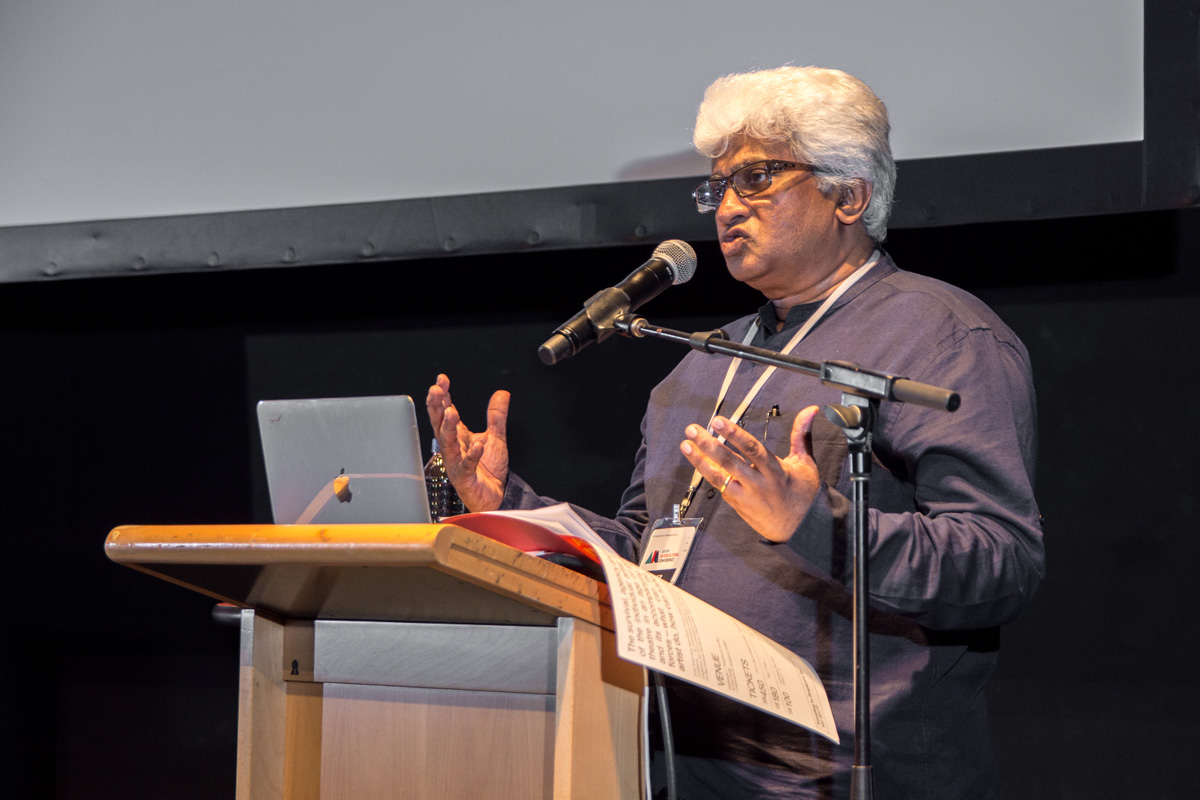
- Born: 23 February 1958 (age 68); Singapore
- Education: National University of Singapore - Master of Arts (Philosophy)
- Honours: Cultural Medallion

Thirunalan Sasitharan (born 23 February 1958; also known as T. Sasitharan) is a Singaporean theatre educator and the co-founder and director of Intercultural Theatre Institute (ITI), formerly known as the Theatre Training & Research Programme (TTRP).

== Life and career ==
Sasitharan attended Victoria School.

For more than 30 years, Sasitharan, has been actively involved as an actor, director and producer in the Singapore theatre scene.

From 1983 to 1989, he taught philosophy at the National University of Singapore.

He was the theatre and visual art critic with The Straits Times from 1988 to 1996, where he also served as the arts editor for the ‘Life!’ Section. He had 14 articles ranging from commentaries on Singapore culture and the arts to reviews of performances, exhibitions, talks and catalogue entries published both in Singapore and overseas.

He then became the second Artistic Director of The Substation from April 1996 to August 2000 before he founded ITI with the late Kuo Pao Kun in 2000. ITI is now a private school under the Committee for Private Education.

In 2015, Sasitharan starred in the segment "The Flame" of omnibus film 7 Letters.

== Personal life ==
Sasitharan is married to Kavita Kumari Ratty, an associate director at a university research institute. The couple have 2 daughters.

== Awards and honours ==
In 2012, he was awarded the Cultural Medallion, the highest award for the arts in Singapore.

In 2022, he received the Harvard Club of Singapore Fellow Award for his contributions to the development of arts and culture in Singapore.

== Bibliography ==
- Lessons to be Learnt from a Cat [Straits Times ‘88]
- Advisory Committee of Arts and Culture Report [Straits Times ‘89]
- Vincent van Gogh’s Death Centenary Exhibition [Amsterdam] [Straits Times ‘90]
- Opening of The Substation [Straits Times ‘90]
- Adelaide Arts Festival Coverage [Straits Times ‘92]
- Singapore Festival of Arts Coverage [Straits Times ‘90/’92/’94]
- Art Here: What Price Space? [Space, Spaces and Spacing. Ed Lee Weng Choy ‘96]
- The Boot and The Butterfly [Straits Times ‘96]
- A Bridge Not Too Far [Sunday Times, Sunday Review Mar 98]
- The Arts: Of Swords, Harnesses and Blinkers [G.Koh and Ooi G. L., (eds.), State-Society Relations in Singapore, Singapore: Oxford University Press. 2000]
- Cultural Exchange and the New Asian Identity [Xpressions No. 4 October 22, 1998, Hong Kong]
- The Relationship of Art Discourse and Communities of Art Practice in General [Singapore Art Museum, ASEAN Art Workshop, Exhibition &Symposium on Aesthetics‘01]
- Visions [Selves, National Arts Council, 2002, Singapore]
- Capturing the World sub specie aeternitatis or Why Do Art? in Singathology: 50 New Works by Celebrated Singaporean Writers, Editor: Gwee Li Sui, Marshall Cavendish International Asia Pte Ltd, 2015, ISBN 981472193X
- Why Dance? A symposium on the multiple trajectories of Indian dance traditions [Seminar, Issue 676, December 2015]
- Special issue on ‘intercultural’ acting and actor/performer training (Vol. 7, Issue 3) Phillip Zarrilli, T. Sasitharan & Anuradha Kapur, Pages 335-339 Taylor & Francis, 31 Oct 2016
- Capturing the World — sub specie aeternitatis [Springer International Publishing AG 2017, Published online: 26 June 2017,]
