= Slappy Cakes =

American restaurant chain

Coordinates: 45.5164°N 122.6185°W

- Logo of original location
- Industry: Restaurant
- Founded: 2009 in Portland, Oregon, United States
- Founder: Ashley Berry, Adam Fuderer
- Headquarters: Portland, Oregon, United States
- Website: www.slappycakes.com

Slappy Cakes is a restaurant chain based in Portland, Oregon and serving primarily breakfast food with locations in the United States and Singapore.

== History ==
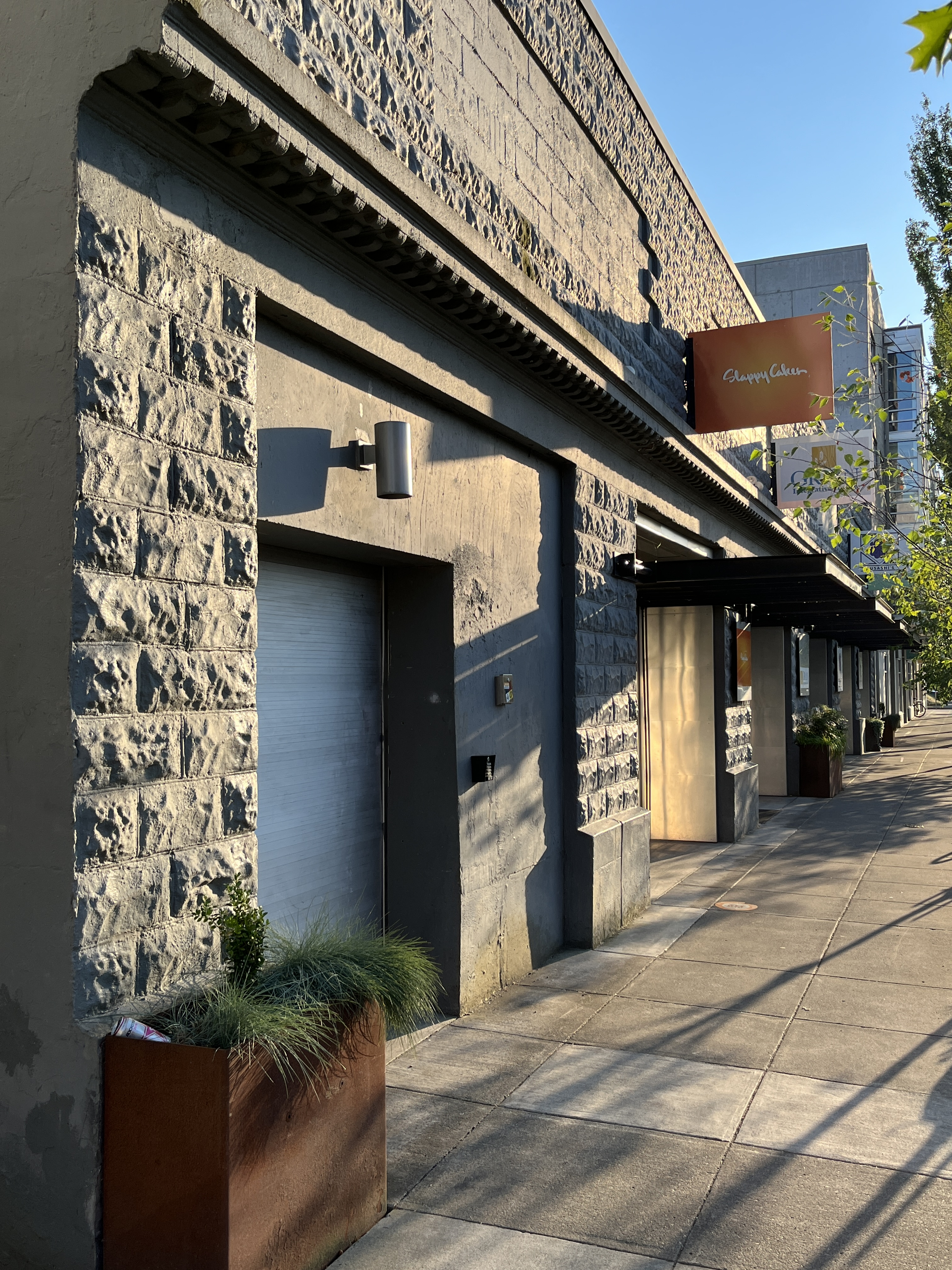
Exterior of the restaurant in Portland, Oregon, in 2022

Slappy cakes was started in 2009 by Ashley Berry and Adam Fuderer in the Belmont district of Portland, Oregon. The restaurant features tabletop griddles and batter is served in a plastic bottle so that patrons can draw designs on the griddle. In 2020, Slappy Cakes announced that it would open a location in Highland Park neighborhood of Los Angeles. In 2013, Slappy Cakes opened a location in the Shinjuku neighborhood of Tokyo, Japan. By 2019, the restaurant chain had expanded to Malaysia, Japan, and Singapore.

== Locations ==
=== United States ===
- Sunnyside's Belmont district, Portland, Oregon (opened 2009)
- Lahaina, Hawaii

=== Asia ===
- Plaza Singapura, Orchard Road, Singapore
- Resorts World Sentosa, Sentosa, Singapore
- Publika, Solaris Dutamas, Malaysia
- Osaka, Japan
- Shinjuku, Tokyo, Japan
