= Ketna Patel =

British-Indian artist

Ketna Patel (born 1968) is a British-Indian pop artist.

== Early life and education ==
Ketna Patel was born in Uganda in 1968 into a family of Gujarati Indian heritage and spent her childhood in Kenya, growing up within the multicultural environment of the East African Indian diaspora. As a member of an ethnic minority, she experienced the intersections of African, Indian and British cultures while remaining conscious of her position as an outsider.

Following the attempted military coup in Kenya on 1 August 1982, Patel moved to the United Kingdom at the age of fourteen, without her family. Arriving during winter, a season she had never previously experienced, marked an abrupt transition from her East African childhood.

Her experiences of cultural displacement and minority identity contributed to an observational approach that would later inform her artistic practice. Rather than identifying exclusively with any single cultural narrative, Patel developed an interest in the ways societies construct identity, belonging and collective beliefs. This perspective evolved into a visual language drawing on mythology, folklore, metaphor and popular culture, through which she examines the relationship between individual experience and dominant social narratives.

Patel studied fine art at the University of Westminster (1986–1987), interior architecture at Middlesex University (1987–1991), and architecture at the Architectural Association in London (1991–1993). Her architectural training subsequently influenced her multidisciplinary practice, particularly her use of furniture, domestic objects and architectural spaces as artistic surfaces.

== Career ==
=== Early career and Singapore (1993–2004) ===
Patel studied interior architecture at Middlesex University and architecture at the Architectural Association in London, completing her studies in 1993. She subsequently moved to Singapore, where she worked with DP Architects on the Esplanade – Theatres on the Bay project between 1994 and 1996.

In 1996, she left architectural practice to establish herself as an independent artist and designer. Her early career included large-scale commissions for Singapore hotels, notably the Conrad Centennial, Raffles The Plaza (now Fairmont Singapore) and Swissôtel The Stamford. She also produced paintings, photographic collages and installations for restaurants, commercial properties, corporate offices and public institutions, including Singapore's Family and Juvenile Court.

During this period, Patel developed a multidisciplinary practice combining painting, photography, collage, sculpture and functional design. Her Asia Pop works drew upon Asian street culture, advertising, religious iconography and popular media, exploring cultural identity and the effects of globalisation. Rather than restricting her work to conventional canvases, she applied imagery to furniture, vehicles and domestic objects.

Her Singapore studio also developed into an experiment in communal living and an informal artists' collective, bringing together practitioners from different creative disciplines.

=== International exhibitions and collaborations (2005–2012) ===
Patel's practice expanded through international exhibitions, institutional commissions and commercial collaborations. Her work was examined in Ian Findlay's essay A Decade of Transitions, published in Asian Art News (2007), and featured in SilverKris (2007), Inside Outside (2011) and books including Bridget Tracy Tan's Women Artists in Singapore, Jane Leong's Contemporary Artists in Singapore and Tatjana Schantz Johnsson's Decorating Asia.

Her commercial collaborations included projects with the National Museum of Singapore, Tata Motors, Kiehl's, the International Indian Film Academy (IIFA), filmmaker Spike Lee and fashion label AllDressedUp. Her Asia Pop imagery informed AllDressedUp's Spring/Summer 2010 collection, which was presented internationally.

In 2011, Tata Motors commissioned Patel to transform a Nano car into an artwork using Italian glass mosaics produced by SICIS. She also participated in Elephant Parade, creating a painted fibreglass elephant, and collaborated with Kiehl's Singapore in 2012 on its Children of Our Rare Earth campaign, producing artwork for limited-edition skincare packaging and a painted sculpture of the brand's Mr. Bones mascot to support the Autism Association (Singapore).

In 2011, the Salsali Private Museum in Dubai acquired and exhibited her artwork Asian Grandfathers.

Alongside these projects, Patel developed licensing collaborations that extended her imagery into furniture and interior design, including a partnership with Austrian furniture manufacturer ADA for decorative headboard designs.

=== Rural–urban research and cultural identity (2013–2018) ===
From 2013 onwards, Patel increasingly investigated migration, cultural hybridity and the rural–urban divide. Between 2013 and 2018, she organised and participated in collaborative art projects in villages across India and the United Kingdom, including initiatives in Himachal Pradesh, Odisha and Madhya Pradesh.

These projects examined the effects of globalisation on local communities, traditional knowledge, cultural expression and changing ideas of identity and belonging. Travel and photographic documentation across Asia, Africa, Europe and the Middle East remained integral to her artistic research.

In March 2015, Patel returned to Singapore to present Secret Land, an exhibition organised in association with Women on a Mission (WOAM) in support of AWARE's Sexual Assault Care Centre.

In 2018, she received the UK-India Youth Leader Award and was subsequently selected to join the steering committee of the Commonwealth Business Women's Network. She also became an active member of Bridge India, a London-based think tank, organizing several cultural and artistic events / soirees / talks at her studio and other London venues.

=== Return to Britain and recent work (2019–2026) ===
Following her return to Britain, Patel's work developed a stronger focus on the British-Indian diaspora, colonial histories and the relationship between Eastern and Western cultural identities. These themes were discussed in a two-part profile published by Asian Voice in June 2019 and in Amita Sarwal's Inside Outside feature, Painting Europe with an Asian Brush (2022).

Her work increasingly combined mythology, historical references, political imagery and popular culture, using visual juxtapositions to examine migration, identity and social change. Participation in exhibitions and art fairs, including the Affordable Art Fair, introduced her work to a broader international audience.

In October 2023, Patel presented Britindia at Headstone Manor Museum in London, exploring the overlapping histories and identities of Britain and India. In January 2025, she held the solo exhibition Remixology: The Art of Cultural Storytelling at the Heath Robinson Museum in Pinner, London.

In 2025, Patel was selected as the artist in residence for the Jhalak Prose Prize, creating Time Is a Migrant Too, a collage exploring migration, cultural identity and the relationship between past and present.

Alongside her studio practice, Patel has continued researching vernacular architecture, cultural memory and rural heritage in Gujarat, particularly in Dharmaj, her family's ancestral village. By 2026, this research had developed into involvement in heritage and community initiatives concerned with preserving historic buildings and reconnecting multi generational diaspora communities with their cultural roots.

== Awards ==
- 2002: ASEAN Art Award
- 2018: UK-India Youth Leader Award
