= Alex Abisheganaden =

Singaporean guitarist (1926–2023)

- அலெக்ஸாண்டர் எஸ். அபிஷேகநாதன்
- Abisheganaden in 1988
- Born: Alexander S. Abisheganaden; 13 January 1926; Straits Settlements
- Died: 17 March 2023 (aged 97); St Luke's Hospital, Singapore
- Occupation(s): Guitarist; Bassist
- Spouse: Eileen Wong
- Children: 2; including Jacintha
- Relatives: Paul Abisheganaden (older brother)
- Awards: Pingat Bakti Setia, 1981; Cultural Medallion, 1988

Alexander S. Abisheganaden (Tamil: அலெக்ஸாண்டர் எஸ். அபிஷேகநாதன்; 31 January 1926 – 17 March 2023) was a Singaporean classical guitarist and double bassist. Regarded as "the most important guitarist in Singapore history", Abisheganaden was also an educator and was the Inspector of Schools from 1964 to 1981 for the Ministry of Education (MOE). In 1988, he received the Cultural Medallion award for Music.

== Early life ==
Abisheganaden was born on 31 January 1926, the sixth of seven children to Arputhnathan Abisheganaden, an immigrant from Tamil Nadu who worked for the then-British colonial Singapore government, and Elizabeth Abisheganaden, who came from a rich Tamil family of Ceylonese descent from Penang, Malaysia.

He and his family lived at government quarters at Buffalo Road, next to KK Women's and Children's Hospital facing Farrer Park. Abisheganaden was influenced by music from a young age, due to his father's morning routine of praying and singing in the morning.

When he was six, he was asked to sing and perform at a variety show at New World Amusement Park. After the show, Abisheganaden participated in more performances and also performed at his school, St. Andrews. When World War II started, blackouts were frequent and during those times, Abisheganaden spent his time practicing the guitar with his brother, Gerard.

After World War II, Abisheganaden completed his Senior Cambridge examinations (now known as O-Levels) and began a career in teaching. In 1961, he studied music in England.

== Career ==
In 1964, Abisheganaden worked at MOE as an Inspector of Schools and was eventually asked to look over the Music Unit of the ministry. During the Japanese occupation, Abisheganaden learnt Japanese and Japanese songs. After hearing his singing, he was recommended to the Syonan Broadcasting Station, where he sang and taught Japanese songs.

When Subhas Chandra Bose began the Indian independence movement, they set up a broadcasting station, Azad-Hind Radio Station, in Singapore at Cathay Building. Abisheganaden was involved with the station as a member of a five-person band.

In the 1970s, Abisheganaden was commissioned by then-Minister for Education Goh Keng Swee to make a 26-episode long television show about the guitar titled Music Making With The Guitar. It ran from 1970 to 1971.

Abisheganaden founded the Singapore Classical Guitar Society and the National University of Singapore Guitar Ensemble (GENUS) in 1967 and 1981 respectively. In 1981, Abisheganaden was awarded the Pingat Bakti Setia on National Day. In 1988, Abisheganaden was awarded the Cultural Medallion for Music.

In 2005, he appeared in director Tan Pin Pin's documentary Singapore GaGa, alongside harmonica player Yew Hong Chow.

== Death ==
Abisheganaden died at St Luke's Hospital on 17 March 2023. He is survived by his wife Eileen Wong and children Peter and Jacintha Abisheganaden.
