= Ong Keng Sen =

Singaporean director (born 1963)

- Born: 20 November 1963 (age 62)
- Education: National University of Singapore; New York University
- Occupation: director
- Agent: TheatreWorks
- Awards: Young Artist Award (1992); Cultural Medallion (2003); Fukuoka Prize for Art and Culture (2010)

Chinese name
- Simplified Chinese: 王景生
Transcriptions
Standard Mandarin
- Hanyu Pinyin: Wáng Jǐngshēng
Southern Min
- Hokkien POJ: Ông Kéng-seⁿ

Ong Keng Sen (born 20 November 1963; Chinese: 王景生; Pe̍h-ōe-jī: Ông Kéng-seⁿ; pinyin: Wáng Jǐngshēng) is a Singaporean director of the theatre group TheatreWorks, which was founded in 1985.

== Early life ==
Ong Keng Sen was youngest of six children born to immigrants from Putian, China. Ong joined the drama club at Anglo-Chinese Primary School and went on to serve as president of the Varsity Playhouse of the National University of Singapore as he was studying law. A trained lawyer, he completed his pupillage at Singapore law firm Lee & Lee. Ong is also Fulbright scholar who studied intercultural performance with the Performance Studies Department at Tisch School of the Arts, New York University.

== Theatre career ==
=== Theatre ===
Ong took on the post of artistic director of theatre group TheatreWorks in 1988. He was involved with the production of comedies such as Beauty World and Army Daze. His local productions include Destinies of Flowers in the Mirror and Descendants of the Admiral Eunuch.

Ong was the director of Singapore International Festival of Arts (SIFA) from 2014 to 2017. The SIFA was a revamped, independent version of its predecessor, the Singapore Arts Festival. Ong was invited to recreate this national performing arts festival after an industry review. He was the first artist to helm the festival since the festival's inception in 1977, which had previously been headed by civil servants. In this capacity, he sought to ensure the sustainability of the festival.

Ong restructured the festival and renamed it SIFA to highlight the Singapore and international perspectives in it. Beginning with 20,000 audiences in SIFA 2014, this has increased to 62,000 and in 2016, the festival peaked with 155,000 attendances, 96% capacity houses and 75% of its performances sold out. Further in 2016, he was responsible for raising 20% of the S$9 mil festival through sponsorship. During his tenure, he has brought international artists to work with Singapore art schools. He has capacity-built cultural development through his scaffold of an alternating international and local focus for SIFA from year to year. As festival director, he has been vocal about the government restrictions and non-transparent OB markers for performance arts staged in Singapore.

In addition to serving as festival director, Ong has directed one performance every year at the festival. Ong directed Facing Goya, a Michael Nyman-composed opera, for the opening of Singapore International Festival of Arts 2014.

In 2015, Ong directed a six-hour site-specific performance, The Incredible Adventures Of Border Crossers, for the opening of the inaugural Singapore Festival in France at the Palais de Tokyo. The production involved 30 foreigners and explored what it meant to be a "border crosser". The festival also re-staged at Theater de la Ville Paris, TheatreWorks' Lear Dreaming, directed by Ong. In the same year, Lear, directed by Ong and written by Rio Kishida, was selected by The Business Times as one of the "finest plays in 50 years" alongside productions by Goh Poh Seng, Michael Chiang and Alfian Sa'at and others.

In 2016, Ong created Sandaime Richard based on Hideki Noda's script of the same title with kabuki onnagata Kazutaro Nakamura as Richard III. This gender bending production at Tokyo Metropolitan Theater was followed by a new production of Trojan Women at the National Theater of Korea, showcasing a blend of pansori, K-pop and Greek tragedy. In particular, the show gained much attention by casting a male pansori singer as Helen of Troy.

=== Film ===
Ong directed the Singaporean film Army Daze, based on a play written by Michael Chiang. The movie was released in 1996.

== Themes and style ==
Ong is a member of the Asia-Europe Network, which promotes the artistic exchange between Asia and Europe. He has been applauded around the world for this kind of transcultural theatre which mixes Western and Eastern performance traditions, especially dance with spoken word drama. Ong is largely contributed to cultivating young, educated, imaginative audiences for new works. Ong's unique "process-oriented" projects involves placing wide ranges of master practitioners of different traditions on the same stage, but remaining independent in their own aesthetics. He is particularly well known for his performance at the Bunkamura Cocoon Tokyo production of Lear in 1997, his Desdemona at the Adelaide Festival, Australia in 2000, and his Search:Hamlet at the Kronbourg Castle in Elsinore and Copenhagen.

== Accolades ==
Ong is the first artist to have received the two most acclaimed Singaporean cultural awards, the Young Artist Award (1992) and the Cultural Medallion (2003). In 2010, he received the prestigious Fukuoka Prize for Art and Culture for his contemporary performance directions.

== Personal life ==
Ong Keng Sen is the younger brother of Ong Keng Yong.

== See also ==
- Culture of Singapore
- TheatreWorks
