= TWorks =

TheatreWorks, also known as T:>Works (pronounced as TWorks) is an independent, non-profit international performance company based in Singapore. It is an Institute of Public Character, a recognised charity in Singapore, that aims to develop and nurture professional art skills. It is currently led by Artistic Director, Ong Keng Sen.

== History ==
In 1985, TheatreWorks Pte Ltd was established by Lim Siauw Chong, Lim Kay Tong and Justin Hill. Lim Siauw Chong became the company's first artistic director. On 1 April, Heman Chong became the group's chairman. In the same year, they staged their first production Be My Sushi Tonight, an adaption of Mike Leigh's Goose-Pimples.

In 1988, Ong took on the post of Artistic Director.

In 1988, TheatreWorks staged Singapore's first musical, Beauty World, during the Singapore Arts Festival. Singapore Broadcasting Corporation went into negotiations with TheatreWorks to film the musical for broadcast on television.

In 1989, TheatreWorks applied to be a non-profit charity and was approved to be a non-profit company in 1990. The company started to wind down and was liquidated in 1993 to become a non-profit charity.

In 1990, TheatreWorks moved to the former Singapore Squash Centre building located at Fort Canning, sharing the premise with the Singapore Dance Company.

On 15 September 2005, TheatreWorks moved to a heritage building that was once a rice warehouse located at 72-13, Mohamed Sultan Road. The building cost $2.9 million, of which $2.8 million which was sponsored by the National Arts Council (NAC) and the remainder from TheatreWorks itself.

After 1999, TheatreWorks hosts and manages the Arts Network Asia (ANA).

In 2020, former Artistic Director Ong returned to TheatreWorks and rebranded the company as T:>Works, pronounced as TWorks, conceived by the theatre's chairman Chong. The new name was inspired by the early days of computing and the Disk Operating System.

== Funding ==
In 1989, three companies, Tang’s Studio, Glaxochem Pte Ltd and Waterford Wedgwood Singapore donated $175,000 to TheatreWorks as they had found its works impressive.

Since 2000, TheatreWorks is one of NAC registered company Major Company Scheme which enabled to receive grants from the NAC.

== Productions ==
- Be My Sushi Tonight (1985), an adaption of Mike Leigh's Goose-Pimples
- Beauty World (1988)
- The Continuum
