= Writing in Asia Series =

Asian book series (1966-1996)

Writing in Asia Series was a series of books of Asian writing published from 1966 to 1996 by Heinemann Educational Books (Asia) Ltd (often referred to as Heinemann Asia), a subsidiary of Heinemann, London. Initiated and mainly edited by Leon Comber, the series brought attention to various Asian Anglophone writers, like Shirley Geok-lin Lim, Western writers based in Asia like Austin Coates and W. Somerset Maugham and modern and classic stories and novels in English translation from the Malay, Indonesian, Thai and more. The series is also credited with contributing prominently to creative writing and the creation of a shared regional identity amongst English-language writers of Southeast Asia. After publishing more than 110 titles, the series folded after Heinemann Asia was taken over by a parent group of publishers and Comber left.

== History ==
Inspired by the successful and pioneering African Writers Series, Leon Comber, the then Southeast Asian Representative of Heinemann Educational Books Ltd., founded the series as its general editor in 1966 in Singapore. Comber thought a similar series focussing initially on Southeast Asia was worth pursuing to "give a tremendous boost to creative writing in English...which was still regarded then as something of a cultural desert". He also wanted to publish the "tremendous body of local writers writing in their local languages" across the entire Asia in English translation "to make it available to a wider reading public" as he felt that existent publishers only focussed on their individual countries.

Buoyed by the profits made from textbook publishing, the series first published Modern Malaysian Chinese Stories in 1967. The anthology, whose stories were edited and mainly translated into English by Ly Singko with a foreword by Han Suyin, sold moderately, but Ly was to be detained without trial shortly after by the Singapore authorities under the Internal Security Act for supposed "Chinese chauvinism".

The series met with commercial success a decade later when two reprinted Austin Coates books in the series, Myself a Mandarin (1977, c.1968) and City of Broken Promises (1977, c.1960), became bestsellers. The former was also serialised by the BBC, broadcast on Radio Hong Kong and had its film rights sold, while the latter was adapted into a play at the 1978 Hong Kong Festival of Arts. Other commercially successful titles were Tan Kok Seng's autobiography Son of Singapore (1972), which sold over 25,000 copies, and Catherine Lim's short-story collection Little Ironies: Stories of Singapore (1978), which sold 8,000 copies. By 1988, about 15 titles in the series were used as supplementary textbooks in Singapore schools, guaranteeing sales in the thousands.

Significantly, as part of the series, Australian Harry Aveling translated Pramoedya Ananta Toer's novel The Fugitive (Perburuan) (1975, c.1950) and Iwan Simatupang's novel The Pilgrim (Ziarah) (1969) from the Indonesian to English. The Pilgrim is considered the first modern Indonesian novel and won the first ASEAN Literary Award for the novel in 1977. The series also met with critical acclaim when Shirley Geok-lin Lim's debut collection Crossing The Peninsula & Other Stories (1980) won the Commonwealth Poetry Prize, a first both for an Asian and for a woman. The series also published the debut titles of pioneering Singapore poets like Edwin Thumboo and Lee Tzu Pheng.

In 1982, however, Charles Cher, the then General Manager of Heinemann Educational Books, confirmed that the series had stopped publishing poetry because of poor sales. In 1985, after publishing more than 70 titles, Comber left the series after Heinemann Asia was taken over by a parent group of publishers. In retrospect, Comber notes that in business terms, Heinemann made "very little" from the series, though it neither lost much, with textbook publishing sales subsidising the series. The series continued until around 1996, resuming publishing poetry and diversifying its focus beyond literary fiction to ghost stories.

Some Writing in Asia series titles have since been republished by other companies, like Lloyd Fernando's novel Scorpion Orchid (1976) by Epigram Books in 2014.

== List of authors and books in the Writing in Asia Series ==
No.	Author	Year	Title and Details
1	Ly Singko, ed.	1967	Modern Malaysian Chinese Stories. Anthology translated from the Mandarin Chinese by Ly Singko and Leon Comber with a foreword by Han Suyin.
2	Lloyd Fernando, ed.	1968	22 Malaysian Stories. Anthology. Contributors include Siew Yue Killingley, Goh Poh Seng and Stella Kon.
3	Iwan Simatupang	1969	The Pilgrim (Ziarah). Novel translated from the Indonesian by Harry Aveling. Winner of the ASEAN Literary Award 1977.
4	W. Somerset Maugham	1969	Maugham's Malaysian Stories. Edited and with an introduction by Anthony Burgess.
5	Leon Comber, trans.	1972	The Strange Cases Of Magistrate Pao: Chinese Tales Of Crime And Detection
6	Tan Kok Seng	1972	Son of Singapore. First part of autobiography. Rendered into English in collaboration with Austin Coates.
7	Wang Shifu	1973	The Romance of the Western Chamber. Translated and adapted by T. C. Lai and Ed Gamarekian, with a foreword by Lin Yutang. Originally published in 1200.
8	Lee Kok Liang	1974	The Mutes in the Sun and Other Stories. Short stories and a novella.
9	Tan Kok Seng	1974	Man of Malaysia. Second part of autobiography. Rendered into English in collaboration with Austin Coates.
10	Jennifer Draskau, ed.	1975	Taw and Other Thai Stories: An Anthology. Translated from the Thai and with an introduction by Jennifer Draskau.
11	Pramoedya Ananta Toer	1975	The Fugitive (Perburuan). Novel translated from the Indonesian by Harry Aveling, originally published in 1950.
12	Tan Kok Seng	1975	Eye on the World. Third and final part of autobiography. Rendered into English in collaboration with Austin Coates.
13	Alan Ayling & Duncan Mackintosh, trans.	1976	A Folding Screen: Selected Chinese Lyrics from T'ang to Mao Tse-tung. Originally published in 1974.
14	Edwin Thumboo, ed.	1976	Second Tongue: An Anthology Of Poetry From Malaysia And Singapore. With an introduction by Edwin Thumboo. Contributors include Ee Tiang Hong, Muhammad Haji Salleh, Wong May and Arthur Yap.
15	W. Somerset Maugham	1976	Maugham's Borneo Stories. Selected by G. V. de Freitas.
16	Lloyd Fernando	1976	Scorpion Orchid. Novel.
17	Goh Poh Seng	1976	Eyewitness. Poetry.
18	Raden Adjeng Kartini	1976	Letters of a Javanese Princess. Translated by Agnes Louise Symmers, edited and with an introduction by Hildred Geertz and with an introduction by Eleanor Roosevelt. Originally published in Dutch in 1911 and in English in 1920.
19	Ee Tiang Hong	1976	Myths for a Wilderness. Poetry.
20	Harry Aveling, ed.	1976	From Surabaya to Armageddon: Indonesian Short Stories. Translated from the Indonesian by Harry Aveling.
21	Lin Yutang	1977	My Country And My People. Originally published in 1935.
22	Jan Knappert	1977	Myths and Legends of Indonesia
23	Austin Coates	1977	Myself a Mandarin. Memoir, originally published in 1968.
24	Robert Yeo	1977	And Napalm Does Not Help. Poetry.
25	Edwin Thumboo	1977	Gods Can Die. Poetry.
26	Arthur Yap	1977	Commonplace. Poetry.
27	Goh Poh Seng	1977	The Immolation. Novel.
28	Syed Waliullah	1978	Tree Without Roots. Novel. Originally published in 1948.
29	Robert Yeo, ed.	1978	Singapore Short Stories. With an introduction by Robert Yeo and notes by Tan Swee Kheng. Contributors include Catherine Lim, Gopal Baratham and Goh Sin Tub.
30	Muhammad Haji Salleh	1978	Time and Its People. Poetry.
31	Cecil Rajendra	1978	Bones & Feathers. Poetry.
32	Edith L. Tiempo	1978	A Blade of Fern: A Novel About the Philippines
33	Thakazhi Sivasankara Pillai	1978	Chemmeen: A Novel About India. Translated by Narayana Menon, with an introduction by Santha Rama Rau. Originally published in 1964.
34	Chung Chong-Wha, ed.	1978	Modern Far Eastern Stories
35	Iwan Simatupang	1978	Kering (Drought). Novel translated from the Indonesian by Harry Aveling, originally published in 1972.
36	Danarto	1978	Abracadabra. Short stories translated from the Indonesian by Harry Aveling.
37	Catherine Lim	1978	Little Ironies: Stories of Singapore
38	Ediriwira Sarachchandra	1978	Curfew and a Full Moon. Novel.
39	Edwin Thumboo	1979	Ulysses by the Merlion. Poetry.
40	Yasmine Gooneratne, ed.	1979	Stories from Sri Lanka. With an introduction by Yasmine Gooneratne.
41	Shahnon Ahmad	1979	Srengenge. Novel translated from the Malay by Harry Aveling. Originally published in 1973. Winner of the Malaysian Novel of the Year 1970.
42	Yasmine Gooneratne, ed.	1979	Poems from India, Sri Lanka, Malaysia and Singapore
43	Robert Burdette Sweet	1979	Akbar the Great. Novel.
44	Stanley R. Munro, ed.	1979	Genesis of a Revolution: An Anthology of Modern Chinese Short Stories. Translated from the Chinese by Stanley R. Munro. Contributors include Ba, J., Bing, X. and Ding, L.
45	Tan Kok Seng	1979	Three Sisters of Sz. Novel. Rendered into English in collaboration with Austin Coates.
46	Hwang Sun-Won	1980	The Stars and Other Korean Short Stories. Translated from the Korean and with an introduction by Edward W. Poitras.
47	Kim Man-Jung	1980	A Nine Cloud Dream. Translated from the Korean by Richard Rutt.
48	Arthur Yap	1980	Down the Line. Poetry.
49	Ly Singko, trans.	1980	Reunion & Other Stories
50	Shahnon Ahmad	1980	The Third Notch and Other Stories. Translated from the Malay by Harry Aveling.
51	Umar Kayam	1980	Sri Sumarah and Other Stories. Translated from the Indonesian by Harry Aveling.
52	Ruth Lor Malloy	1980	Beyond the Heights. Novel.
53	Ishak Haji Muhammad	1980	The Prince of Mount Tahan (Putera Gunung Tahan). Translated from the Malay by Harry Aveling.
54	F. Sionil José	1980	Waywaya: Eleven Filipino Short Stories
55	Jan Knappert	1980	Malay Myths and Legends
56	Lee Tzu Pheng	1980	Prospect Of A Drowning. Poetry. Winner of the National Book Development Council of Singapore's Book Award for English Poetry 1982.
57	Chung Chong-Wha, ed.	1980	Modern Korean Short Stories
58	Linda Ty-Casper	1980	Dread Empire. Novella.
59	Catherine Lim	1980	Or Else, the Lightning God & Other Stories
60	Shirley Geok-lin Lim	1980	Crossing The Peninsula & Other Stories. Poetry. Winner of the Commonwealth Poetry Prize.
61	J. R. Haldar	1981	Early Buddhist Mythology. With a foreword by C. Sircar.
62	Robert Yeo, ed.	1981	ASEAN Short Stories. Anthology. Contributors include Gopal Baratham, Stella Kon and Rebecca Chua.
63	Lloyd Fernando, ed.	1981	Malaysian Short Stories. Anthology with an introduction by Lloyd Fernando.
64	A. Samad Said	1981	Lazy River (Sungai Mengalir Lesu). Novel translated from the Malay by Harry Aveling. Originally published in 1967.
65	Lee Kok Liang	1981	Flowers in the Sky. Novel.
66	Michael Soh & Lim Yoon Lin	1981	A Son of a Mother. Originally published in 1973.
67	Rebecca Chua	1981	The Newspaper Editor and Other Stories
68	Lee Ding Fai	1981	Running Dog
69	K.S. Maniam	1981	The Return. Novel.
70	Heah Chwee Sian	1981	A Wisp of Bliss and Other Stories
71	Wong Meng Voon	1981	Glimpses of the Past: Stories from Singapore & Malaysia
72	H. Jathar Salij	1982	Shadow Play and Other Stories
73	Oh Yong-su	1985	The Good People: Korean Stories. Translated from the Korean by Marshall R. Pihl.
74	Michael Smithies	1985	A Busy Week: Tales from Today's Thailand
75	Wong Swee Hoon	1985	The Phoenix and Other Stories
76	Woo Keng Thye	1986	Web of Tradition. Novel.
77	Arthur Yap	1986	Man Snake Apple & Other Poems
78	Robert Yeo	1986	The Adventures Of Holden Heng. Novel.
79	Goh Sin Tub	1987	Honour and Other Stories. Originally published in 1986 as The Battle of the Bands.
80	Catherine Lim	1987	The Shadow of a Shadow of a Dream: Love Stories of Singapore
81	Goh Sin Tub	1987	The Ghost Lover Of Emerald Hill And Other Stories
82	Ediriwira Sarachchandra	1987	Foam Upon the Stream: A Japanese Elegy. Novel.
83	Nalla Tan	1989	Hearts & Crosses. Short stories.
84	Goh Sin Tub	1989	The Nan-Mei-Su Girls of Emerald Hill. Novel.
85	Woo Keng Thye	1989	Encounter and Other Stories
86	Catherine Khoo	1990	Love Notes
87	Goh Sin Tub	1990	Ghosts of Singapore!. Short stories.
88	Othman Wok	1991	Malayan Horror: Macabre Tales Of Singapore And Malaysia In The 50s
89	Woo Keng Thye	1991	Winds of Change. Novel.
90	Wong Swee Hoon	1991	A Dying Breed. Short stories.
91	Goh Sin Tub	1991	More Ghosts of Singapore!. Short stories.
92	W. W. Williams	1991	Reflections in the River: Contemporary Japanese Short Stories
93	Lin Yutang	1992	The Importance of Living. Originally published in 1937.
94	Syed Adam Aljafri	1992	Ollie's Search For Golden Hope & Other Stories
95	Jack Reynolds	1992	Daughters of an Ancient Race. Originally published in 1974.
96	Judith Anne Lucas & Marsha Goh	1992	Tales of the Hungry Ghosts
97	Helen Lee, ed.	1992	Tapestry: A Collection of Short Stories. Contributors include Gopal Baratham, Arthur Yap and Nalla Tan.
98	Catherine Lim	1992	Deadline for Love and Other Stories
99	Catherine Lim	1992	Love's Lonely Impulses. Poetry.
100	Judith Anne Lucas	1993	Fancies and Follies: Stories of Love
101	Goh Sin Tub	1993	Goh's 12 Best Singapore Stories
102	Toh Weng Choy	1993	Sunshine in the Rain: A Maid's Courage
103	Catherine Lim	1993	The Best Of Catherine Lim. Short stories.
104	Robert Raymer	1993	Lovers and Strangers. Short stories.
105	Michael Smithies	1993	Bight Of Bangkok: A Collection Of Short Stories
106	Beth Yahp	1993	The Crocodile Fury. Novel. Originally published in 1992.
107	Goh Poh Seng	1994	If We Dream Too Long. Novel originally published in 1972. Winner of the National Book Development Council of Singapore's Fiction Book Award 1976.
108	C.C. Hu	1994	Silent Cries from the Dark. Short stories.
109	Goh Sin Tub	1994	Mass Possession: A True Story! Tales of the Supernatural and Natural
110	Marie Gerrina Louis	1994	The Road To Chandibole. Novel.
111	Douglas Lee	1994	A Rose Has Thorns. Novel.
112	Woo Keng Thye	1994	Reincarnation and Other Short Stories
113	Marie Gerrina Louis	1995	Junos. Novel.
114	Syed Adam Aljafri	1996	Reminiscences: A Collection of Short Stories

== See also ==
- African Writers Series
- List of Malaysian writers
- List of Indonesian-language poets
