= The Serpent's Tooth =

The Serpent's Tooth may refer to:

- The Serpent's Tooth (novel), a 1982 novel by Catherine Lim
- The Serpent's Tooth (film), a 1917 American silent drama film
- "The Serpent's Tooth" (Law & Order), a 1991 television episode
- "The Serpent's Tooth" (My Family), a 2000 television episode
- A quotation from King Lear. "How sharper than a serpent's tooth it is to have a thankless child!"

== See also ==
- James Bond 007: Serpent's Tooth, a 1992 spy comic book limited series
