= Heartland (Shiau novel) =

1999 novel by Daren Shiau

- Author: Daren Shiau
- Language: English
- Genre: Novel
- Publisher: Raffles (SNP), Ethos Books
- Publication date: 1999, 2002, 2007, 2021
- Publication place: Singapore
- Media type: Print (Paperback)
- Pages: 228
- ISBN: 981-04-5605-0

Heartland is the first novel written by Daren Shiau. The book received the Singapore Literature Prize Commendation Award in 1998, together with Alfian Sa'at's Corridor. In 2007, an academic edition of Heartland was adopted into a textbook for Singapore secondary schools offering English literature in their GCE O-Level curriculum.

In 2015, MediaCorp commissioned the adaptation of Heartland into a telemovie directed by K Rajagopal. Heartland, the telemovie, was broadcast in August 2015.

== Critical reception ==
Heartland has been hailed as “the definitive Singapore novel”, by author Johann S Lee and by travel guide Lonely Planet: Singapore, Malaysia and Brunei.

Playwright Alfian Sa’at, in his review of Shiau’s second book, following Heartland, noted: “One really has to admire Daren Shiau as a writer. Peninsular has its precedent in Shiau’s novel, Heartland, which gives its intentions solid credibility.”

Commenting on Heartland in his essay on Shiau’s work, Emeritus Professor Edwin Thumboo wrote: “A personal vision. A personal response. That is what Shiau has developed to a remarkable extent. In his interview with Philip Cheah, Shiau said apropos of Heartland, his first book, that he wanted to write about ‘an individual trying to find his sense of place in space (geography) and time (history), and that the Sang Nila Utama myth/history is important in the novel’s structure because ‘its ambiguity (even to the extent of whether he really encountered a lion) questions our reliance on history as fact and reinforces the theme of lost (and false) paternity”.

Dr. Angelia Poon, notes on Heartland, in her essay ‘Common Ground, Multiple Claims: Representing and Constructing Singapore’s Heartland’: “Daren Shiau’s Heartland (1999) is one of the first Singapore novels in English to render the experience of living in Heartlands a central theme and to link it crucially to an investigation of identity and place. Kelvin Tong and Jasmine Ng’s feature film Eating Air (1999)... an independent film for the international film circuit, is also a significant contribution to the depiction of the heartland in Singapore… Both texts seek implicitly to claim the heartland space and the figure of the Heartlander as authentically Singaporean, disclosing to differing extents and levels of self-consciousness, the cultural, social, and political fissures in Singapore society, as well as the limits of imagining alternatives”.

== Background ==
The narrative of Heartland follows three years in the life of Wing Seng, an ambivalent Chinese teenager who experiences a sense of ennui. “Wing, who has just been conscripted, is unable to reconcile his future but unwilling to dwell in the past. He finds his own meaning in an intense attachment to his surrounding landscape. Yet, as relationships and the years slip by him, Wing is irresistibly forced to question his own certainties and the wisdom of the people he values”, Heartland’s synopsis explains.

Influenced by the style of Czech writer Milan Kundera, the novel juxtaposes precolonial, colonial, and modern narratives, starting with Alexander the Great, believed to be Sang Nila Utama’s ancestor. Scholar Makoto Kawaguchi, in his thesis on Heartland written at King’s College London, notes that “the novel weaves episodes from Singapore’s precolonial and colonial past into its main text, drawing on sources such as the Sejarah Melayu (Malay Annals) to provide a counter-narrative to balance Singapore’s technocratic obsession with economic progress.

During the contemporary settings of Heartland's narrative, as Kawaguchi remarks, Wing Seng “attends an elite junior college after his secondary school education at a neighborhood school but fails to do well enough to make it to university. He contemplates a polytechnic education after his national service, a move that has implications for his future mobility and class position in a Singapore concerned with grades and the kinds of schools one attends. The novel’s climax lies in Wing’s discovery that the man he had always thought of as Fifth Uncle might actually be his father, a realization that complicates the idea of origin and birth as determinants of individual identity”.

Kawaguchi observes, in his thesis, “Mapped onto this economic division is a spatial distinction… In one of Heartland’s lyrical passages, this spatial distinction is invoked in order to show that spaces of the heartland are equally as important to the nation as the skyscrapers that comprise the financial district. Following an argument between his Fifth Uncle and his mother over the sale of the family flat, a confused Wing takes the lift to the top floor of one of the high-rise flats of his estate. The view he takes in ‘was nothing spectacular like the cityscape, just mundane places he was familiar with. Yet it was beautiful. In the tiny identical rooms, he knew people were eating, making love, watching TV. People who were, that afternoon, joyous and celebrating, sad and mourning, full of dreams, washed out with despair. Silent as a painting, the estate spoke in its own voice’”. It is precisely familiarity, Kawaguchi argues, “that lies at the heart of what makes the ‘mundane places’ of the estate ‘beautiful’, exemplifying Yi-Fu Tan’s assertion that ‘what begins as undifferentiated space becomes place as we get to know it better and endow it with value’”.

== Parallels to James Joyce’s Ulysses ==
The novel Heartland bears several parallels to James Joyce’s novel Ulysses, with at least fifteen counterparts and analogues. Kawaguchi notes, in his thesis: “Heartland's second epigraph is a quote attributed to an exiled James Joyce, who was said to have declared that ‘when I die, Dublin will be engraved on my heart.' The use of the heart as a metaphor for ‘home’ in Heartland is apparent from the novel's title.”
