= Raymer =

Raymer is a surname. Notable people with the surname include:

- Beth Raymer (born 1976), American writer and journalist
- Brent Raymer (born 1985), NASCAR driver
- Cory Raymer (born 1973), American football player
- Daniel Raymer, American aerospace engineer
- Fred Raymer (1875–1957), American baseball player
- Greg Raymer (born 1964), American poker player
- Rebecca Raymer, American politician and nurse
- Robert Raymer (born 1956), American writer
- Steve Raymer, American journalist
- Vic Raymer, Canadian curler
