= Or else =

Or else may refer to:

- The short-circuit operator or
- A short story in the collection Or Else, the Lightning God & Other Stories
