= If We Dream Too Long =

1972 novel by Goh Poh Seng

- Author: Goh Poh Seng
- Language: English
- Genre: Fiction
- Set in: Singapore
- Publisher: Island Press
- Publication date: 1972
- Publication place: Singapore
- Media type: Print
- Pages: 177
- OCLC: 762332

If We Dream Too Long is a novel written by Singaporean writer Goh Poh Seng. This debut novel was completed in 1968 though it was first published in 1972 by Singapore's Island Press, a press formed by Goh to self-publish his first novel. It was republished by Heinemann in 1994 under the Writing in Asia Series and NUS Press in 2010 under the Ridge Books imprint. The book won the National Book Development Council of Singapore's Fiction Book Award in 1976. It is often hailed as the first true Singaporean novel.

== Plot summary ==
The book follows the life of Kwang Meng, a young 18-year-old who has just graduated from junior college. He currently works as a clerk, a job which he hates and finds monotonous. Two of his junior college friends, Hock Lai and Nadarajah (the latter nicknamed Portia), follow different career paths in their diverging lives. Hock Lai becomes a white-collared worker, determined to climb the corporate ladder, while Portia intends to further his studies in the UK. Kwang Meng meets and strikes up a relationship with a local bar girl, Lucy, at Paradise Bar. Unfortunately, owing to their very different social backgrounds, the couple break up (initiated by Lucy).

Hock Lai tries to matchmake Kwang Meng with one of his female acquaintances Anne. Kwang Meng meets Boon Teik and Mei-I, neighbours who are both teachers, and whom Kwang Meng finds an ideal couple. Hock Lai himself gets married with Cecilia, whose father is one of the richest tycoons of Singapore. Throughout all this, Kwang Meng comes across as a rather passive figure, preferring merely to observe and seek solace through activities like swimming in the sea, smoking and drinking in bars. At the novel's end, Kwang Meng's father suffers a stroke, which destined him to take up the burden of supporting his family.

== Reception ==
If We Dream Too Long encountered a lukewarm reception on its publication in 1972. In Goh's own words, "the local press was unenthusiastic and the university was not supportive". The Straits Times reviewer Cheah Boon Kheng complained that "the style is loose and inelegant, the prose putrid and flat, the jokes puerile and the dialogue chitty chitty bang bang." Elsewhere Dream received a more cordial reception – it was translated into Russian in 1975 and into Tagalog thereafter. In time it came to be appreciated by academics and younger readers who responded enthusiastically when Goh revisited Singapore to discuss the novel.

In 2015, If We Dream Too Long was selected by The Business Times as one of the Top 10 English Singapore books from 1965–2015, alongside titles by Arthur Yap and Daren Shiau. His play, When Smiles Are Done, was also selected as one of the "finest plays in 50 years" with productions by Michael Chiang, Kuo Pao Kun and Alfian Sa'at. In the same year, The Straits Times' Akshita Nanda selected If We Dream Too Long as one of 10 classic Singapore novels. "Widely considered the first true Singaporean novel," she wrote, "it should be enjoyed for the lightness of its prose and the wit and insight of the author."

In 2016, the novel was adapted into an interactive dinner theater event by pop-up events company AndSoForth and the National Arts Council.
