= Goh Sin Tub =

Singaporean writer (1927–2004)

- 吴信达
- Born: 1927; Singapore
- Died: 16 November 2004 (aged 77); Singapore
- Occupations: Writer, teacher, social worker
- Spouse: Dr Sylvia Goh
- Children: Sons: Austin; John; Pat
- Writing career
- Pen name: Easter Goh (English newspaper); Akbar Goh (Malay newspaper)
- Genre: Fiction
- Notable awards: 1964: Second Prize, National Short Stories in Malaysia; 1986: Merit, National Short Story Writing Competition; 1987: Merit, National Short Story Writing Competition; 1988: Merit, National Short Story Writing Competition; 1996: Montblanc-NUS Centre for the Arts Award (English Prose)

Goh Sin Tub (simplified Chinese: 吴信达; traditional Chinese: 吳信達; pinyin: Wú Xìndá; Pe̍h-ōe-jī: Gôo-Sìn-ta̍t) was a well-known pioneer of Singaporean literature. He was a prolific writer of numerous book titles, which includes bestsellers like The Nan-Mei-Su Girls of Emerald Hill, The Ghost Lover of Emerald Hill, and the Ghosts of Singapore. He also wrote a collection of short stories in Malay.

== Background ==
Goh was born in 1927 a second-generation Singapore-born Hokkien Chinese to a family of five siblings. His father was a clerk in the Yokohama Specie Bank (the former Hong Kong and Shanghai Bank) at Clifford Pier while his mother was a housewife. Three generations had lived on 104 Telok Ayer Street for most of their lives, before relocating to River Valley Road. He had primary education at the Royal English School in the River Valley vicinity, and went on to the St. Joseph's Institution together with his eldest brother, Charlie Goh.

In 1935 Goh attended the prestigious boys' school Raffles Institution. When the Japanese began bombing Singapore at the early stage of their invasion, the Goh family hid under a staircase at the back of their house at Emerald Hill. To avoid further bombing, the family later moved to a shophouse in Philip Road. He was a 14-year-old boy at the time of the Occupation.

As a youth, he sold bread and canned goods door to door and a coal worker carrying bags of coal to support his family during the Japanese Occupation. As he was fearful of the Japanese soldiers, he had to learn to be streetwise, and to size people up quickly in order to survive, and make money to support his family. He continued his education at St Joseph's Institution. Goh also won a scholarship to study at the prestigious Raffles College (a predecessor of the National University of Singapore) and graduated with a BA in English.

== Career ==
After graduation, Goh returned to SJI to teach and founded the Youth Circle Poetry interest group at the school, which attracted and encouraged aspiring writers to meet regularly to discuss about writing poetry. Among his former protégés from the club was Edwin Thumboo, who would go on to become a prominent poet and writer in his own right.

In his lifetime he was also a civil servant, serving as deputy secretary to the Permanent Secretary of the Ministry of Health between 1951 - 1969. Moving on from the Ministry, he went into banking as a project management director, and was instrumental to the building of the OCBC Centre and the Dynasty Hotel/Tangs Complex. He also was a social worker and served as chairman of the Board of Governors for the St. Joseph's Institution. He also served on positions on a number of committees of various private and governmental organizations in Singapore. In 1992 Goh, along with Mrs Hedwig Anuar, was appointed to the 69-member Publications Advisory Panel by the Minister for Information and the Arts, to advise approvals and classification of publications referred to them by the Film Censors Board and the Ministry.

== Bibliography ==
=== Novels ===
- The Nan-Mei-Su Girls of Emerald Hill (1989, Heinemann Writing in Asia Series; 1998, Raffles as The Girls of Emerald Hill) ISBN 9971641992 ISBN 9814032026

=== Short story collections ===
- The Battle of the Bands and Other Stories (1986, MPH Magazines; 1987, Heinemann Writing in Asia Series as Honour and Other Stories; 1998, Raffles as Honour and Other Stories) ISBN 9971732165 ISBN 9971641488 ISBN 9814032042
- The Ghost Lover Of Emerald Hill And Other Stories (1987, Heinemann Writing in Asia Series; 1998, Raffles) ISBN 9971641356 ISBN 9814032050
- Ghosts of Singapore! (1990, Heinemann Writing in Asia Series; 1998, Raffles) ISBN 9971642271 ISBN 9814032077
- More Ghosts of Singapore! (1991, Heinemann Writing in Asia Series; 1998, Raffles) ISBN 9971642441 ISBN 9814032085
- The Sin-Kheh (1993, Times Books International) ISBN 9812044671
- Moments in a Singapore Life (1993, UniPress) ISBN 981004254X
- Goh's 12 Best Singapore Stories (1993, Heinemann Writing in Asia Series; 1998, Raffles) ISBN 9971643170 ISBN 9814032034
- Mass Possession: A True Story! Tales of the Supernatural and Natural (1994, Heinemann Writing in Asia Series; 1998, Raffles as The Campus Spirit and Other Stories) ISBN 9971643782 ISBN 9814032069
- "If You Too Could Do Voodoo, Who Would You Do Voodoo To?" and Other Stories (1995, Times Books International) ISBN 981204518X
- Loves of Sons and Daughters (1995, Times Books International) ISBN 9812046178
- 30 Stories: Narrative Compositions for O-level (1996, EPB Publishers) ISBN 9971051613
- 12 Women and Their Stories (1997, Times Books International) ISBN 9812042504
- One Singapore: 65 Stories by a Singaporean (1998, 2000, EPB Publishers) ISBN 9971008769 ISBN 997101159X
- One Singapore 2: 65 More Stories by a Singaporean (2000, EPB Publishers) ISBN 9971011336
- Goh Sin Tub's One Singapore 3: More Singaporean Stories (2001, SNP Pan Pacific Publishing) ISBN 9971093057
- Walk Like A Dragon: Short Stories (2004, Angsana Books) ISBN 9813056746
- The Angel of Changi & Other Stories (2005, Angsana Books) ISBN 9813056908

=== Anthologies ===
- Robert Yeo, ed. Singapore Short Stories (1978, Heinemann Writing in Asia Series) ISBN 9971043173
- Helen Lee, ed. Tapestry: A Collection of Short Stories (1992, Heinemann Writing in Asia Series) ISBN 9971643049
- Kirpal Singh, ed. Rhythms: A Singaporean millennial anthology of poetry (2000, National Arts Council (Singapore)) ISBN 9971887630
- Gwee Li Sui, ed. Written Country: The History of Singapore through Literature (2016, Landmark Publications) ISBN 9789814189668

=== Children's ===
- Rhymes for Malaysian Children (1964, Malaysia Publications)
