= They Do Return...But Gently Lead Them Back =

Short story collection by Catherine Lim

They Do Return...But Gently Lead Them Back is a short story collection written by Singaporean writer Catherine Lim, first published in 1983 by Times Edition Pte Ltd. The theme is on the supernatural and the paranormal.

== Plot summaries ==
- "The Old Man In The Balcony": Knockings on a coffin remind an old man that he is about to die, but he refuses to heed its call.
- "A Boy Named Ah Mooi": A boy is given a girl's name so that he can escape the attentions of malignant ghouls.
- "The Legacy": An old man, Ah Hoe Peh, fights death in the evening so as to bequeath a legacy of surplus to his sons.
- "The Story of Father Monet": A devout Catholic priest is suspected of hanky-panky with a submissive Chinese wife when she gives birth to an albino child.
- "Grandfather's Story": Grandfather tells a tale of karmic rebirth which makes him a mortal enemy of his lawful wife.
- "Of Moles and Buttocks": Moles on the right place give fortune, but a wife's flat, fleshless buttocks will bring no luck to her husband.
- "Full Moon": Superstition cautions one against pointing at a full moon.
- "The Anniversary": A devoted lover believes a dead fiancée will return during her death anniversary.
- "The Exhumation": The exhumation of graves for a country's development leads to the return of a dead grandmother, or it is so believed.
- "Of Blood from Woman": The emission from a woman's menstruation is said to make a powerful love potion.
- "Lee Geok Chan": A young girl student dies before her English examinations, but still manages to write an out-of-point essay for the Cambridge Syndicate.
- "Two Male Children": Two children swap fates as two mothers fight to keep their male offspring alive.
- "A Soldier Stalks": A specter of a dead Japanese soldier causes paranormal activities in a quaint colonial house.
- "They Do Return...But Gently Lead Them Back": Spirits are said to return to haunt the living but they can be led back gently to their final abodes.
- "K.C.": A close friend dies of cancer but his admonishment to open his letter only a year after his death is left unheeded by the author.
