= A Dance of Moths =

1995 novel by Goh Poh Seng

- Author: Goh Poh Seng
- Language: English
- Publisher: Select Books
- Publication date: 1995

A Dance of Moths is the third novel by Singapore-born writer Goh Poh Seng, first published in 1995 by Select Books. It tells the story of two Chinese Singaporean, one a creative designer of an advertising firm and the other an accounts clerk.

== Plot synopsis ==
Divided into three parts and set in Singapore, the dual protagonists are followed through in the novel in alternate chapters. Ong Kian Teck is a creative designer of an advertising firm who has an extra-marital affair and faces estrangement from his wife. Chan Kok Leong is an accounts clerk who tries to free himself from the drudgery of his job. The latter lives in a small HDB flat in Toa Payoh, and has a retarded sister whom his mother dutifully brings up. The connection between the two men is not made clear until the very last chapter of the book.
