= Or Else, the Lightning God & Other Stories =

1980 short story collection by Catherine Lim

- First edition cover
- Author: Catherine Lim
- Genre: Short story collection
- Publisher: Heinemann Educational Books
- Publication date: January 1, 1980
- ISBN: 978-9-971-64014-9

Or Else, the Lightning God & Other Stories is a collection of eighteen short stories by Catherine Lim, first published by Heinemann in 1980 under the Writing in Asia Series. The book follows the success of Little Ironies: Stories of Singapore, published two years ago by the same author. Both these two collections were used as set texts by the University of Cambridge Local Examinations Syndicate for GCE 'O' Levels. Examined in 1989 and 1990, Or Else, the Lightning God & Other Stories was the first Singapore book to be used.

== The Stories ==
The themes and style of the stories are very much carried on from Catherine Lim's first collection of short stories, Little Ironies. They focus on the snobbery, selfishness, prejudice and ignorance of the characters. The stories are also as a rule slightly longer than those in Little Ironies.
