= Scorpion Orchid =

Scorpion Orchid is a novel by Malaysian author Lloyd Fernando, first published by Heinemann Educational Books (Asia) in 1976 under the Writing in Asia Series. The novel is set in Singapore in the 1950s. It was re-published by Epigram Books in September 2011 under the Singapore Classics Series.

== Plot summary ==
The plot entwines four young men of differing ethnic make-up: Santinathan is a Tamil, Guan Kheng a Chinese, Sabran a Malay and Peter D'Almeida a Eurasian. The four of them were former schoolmates and now attends the Singapore university, all in their third year. The story follows them as they become embroiled with the racial riots in Singapore during the 1950s. A distinctive feature of Scorpion Orchid lies in fourteen italicized passages of varying length, drawn from traditional Malayan texts and interwoven into the narrative.

== Themes ==
Scorpion Orchid highlights the racial conflicts in Singapore which was cause for its lack of attention upon release. In a political sense, the novel can be read as a critique on state propagated multicultural pluralism reflected in the differences on race and culture that eventually separated four main characters. Akin to this is the exploration of identity that each of the young men challenge through, facing questions on their ethnicity and its place on their lives.

Being a text charged with meaning, the use of English to narrate Scorpion Orchid is used to highlight the fallacy of its neutrality amongst the historical colonial conflict within the storyline. As a foreign language, its use allowed Fernando to put together and later complicate the relationships of his "in-between culture" characters.
