= O Yeong-su (writer) =

South Korean novelist (1909–1979)

O Yeong-Su
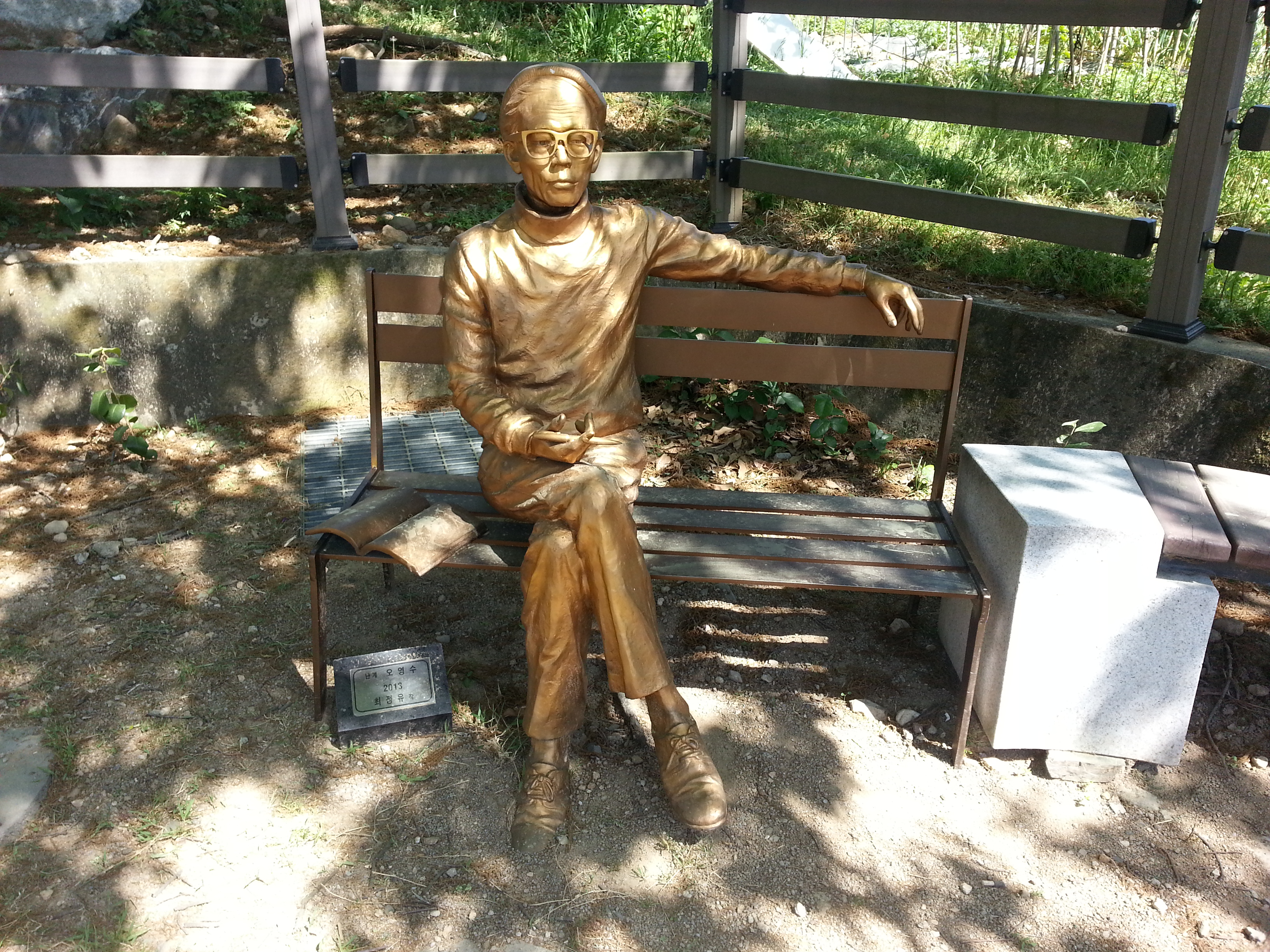
- Statue at the O Yeong-su Literary Museum in Eonyang
- Born: February 11, 1909; Keishōnan-dō, Korea, Empire of Japan
- Died: May 15, 1979 (aged 70); South Gyeongsang Province, South Korea
- Occupation: Novelist

- O Yeong-su
- Hangul: 오영수
- Hanja: 吳永壽
- RR: O Yeongsu
- MR: O Yŏngsu

O Yeong-su or Oh Young-Soo (Korean: 오영수; 11 February 1909 – 15 May 1979) was a South Korean writer.

== Life ==
Korean author O Yeong-su was born in Eonyang (Ulsan County, Keishōnan-dō) on February 11, 1909, and in his early life attended a sodang, a traditional Confucian school. He graduated from elementary school in Eonyang in 1928 and four years later traveled to Japan to attend an intensive program at Niniwa Middle School from which he graduated in 1935. He then attended Nihon University to study engineering, but acquired beri-beri and was forced to withdraw and go back to Korea. O Yeong-su returned to Japan in 1937, but quickly left again to avoid ‘voluntary’ impressment into the Japanese Imperial Army. He returned and finally graduated from the Tokyo National Arts Academy. Upon his return to Korea, he quickly traveled to Manchuria, a common pathway for Koreans seeking to escape Japanese colonial rule. Sometime thereafter he returned to Korea and married in 1942. His parents died the following years: mother in 1943 and father in 1944. In 1945 he moved to Kijang Township (Tongnae County) where he taught at the Kyongnam Girls High School in nearby Busan. In 1952 he changed jobs, moving to the Pusan Middle School. In 1954 O Yeong-su moved to Seoul to help prepare the first edition of the Modern Literature Journal. He quickly became the editor of the journal, where he worked until an ulcer forced him to stop in 1966. After his resignation from Modern Literature, O Yeong-su became very ill and, oppressed by the tax burden of his house, moved from Seoul to Uidong. After surgery removed 2/3 of his stomach O Yeong-su became housebound and eventually moved back to South Kyongsang and died in his home in Ulsan in 1979.

== Work ==
O Yeong-su's first publications occurred on his first return trip to Korea (1935–7) during which time his children's poetry was published in the Chosun Times (Chosun ilbo) and East Asian Times (Donga ilbo). In 1949 he published his first fictional work, Nami and the Taffyman, which appeared in the New World Magazine. This was quickly followed with Wild Grapes which won an award from the Seoul News (Seoul Shinmun). In 1952 O Yeong-su published Uncle in Soldiers’ Literary Digest (Sabyong Mungo) and The Woman from Hwasan in Literary Arts (Munye). From 1954 to 1966, as editor of the Modern Literature journal, O Yeong-su contributed almost 30 stories, including Spring’s Awakening, Migratory Birds, and Girl from an Island. O Yeong-su also wrote for other periodicals including the work A Death at the Mill. In 1955 O Yeong-su received the Prize of the Korean Literature Association and the Asian Liberty Literature Prize in 1959. In 1968 O Yeong-su issued an omnibus of his work, the five volumes of which contained 90 stories. Three years before his death, O Yeong-su published his sixth work of anthology, Dusk. In 1978 he released his last anthology of stories and received an award from the Academy of Arts as well as a governmental Cultural Medal of Merit.

== Critical reception ==
O's works were brief in length and laconic in dialogue. O's critical reputation has declined in recent years as, like Hwang Sun-won, O Yeong-su has been called outdated, escapist and lacking in a national or historical consciousness. In fact, O Yeong-su is rarely overtly political and seldom judges larger political and economic systems, still, his works are laced with snapshots of what these systems result in for common citizens.

== Works in Translation ==
- Good People: Korean Stories (Writing in Asia Series)
- Loess Valley and Other Korean Short Stories (Modern Korean Short Story Series No 1)

== Works in Korean (Partial) ==
- Blood-Clot (Eunghyeol, 1956)
- Migratory Birds (Hujo, 1958)
- The Light and the Dark (Myeongam, 1958)
- A Warbler (Gaegaebi, 1959)

== Awards ==
- Prize of the Korean Literature Association (1955)
- Asia Freedom Literature Prize (1959)
