= The Immolation =

Novel by Goh Poh Seng

First edition

The Immolation is the second novel by Goh Poh Seng, a playwright, poet and novelist who was also a practising doctor. The book was first published by Heinemann Educational Books (Asia) in 1977 under the Writing in Asia Series and republished by Epigram Books in 2011 under the Singapore Classics Series. It concerns freedom fighters in an unnamed Southeast Asian country, which can be inferred from the novel to be Vietnam.

== Plot summary ==
The novel traces the resistance movement of a group of freedom fighters who are watched by secret police at the capital, and who later migrated to the northern provinces of their country (Vietnam during the Vietnam War) to continue their struggles against foreign invaders. The most prominent of these is the protagonist Tranh. The immolation of the title refers to the self-immolation act practised by young Buddhist monk Tran Kim at the start of the novel, as a form of silent protest against the government.
