= The Woman's Book of Superlatives =

First edition

The Woman's Book of Superlatives is a short story collection written by Singaporean writer Catherine Lim, first published in 1993 by Times Edition Pte Ltd. It is a collection with feminist overtones.

== Plot summaries (Stories' order) ==
- "Prologue: Images": The author writes of the "scorpions" women received instead of the eggs.
- "The Enemy": A girl's incipient breast development leads to her being raped by her stepfather.
- "For the Gift of a Man's Understanding": A female secretary is sexually harassed by her immediate superior.
- "Bina": An 11-year-old child bride is sold to a lecherous Arab man of 65 for $2,000.
- "The Paper Women": A divorcée with a Sterilization Certificate encounters a virgin prostitute with her Virginal Certificate and a Filipino maid with a Certificate of Non-Pregnancy.
- "The Rest is Bonus": Meenachi offers food to a shrine goddess for protecting her from domestic abuse, even though her husband kills her unborn child.
- "The Song of Golden Frond": A Chinese bondmaid falls in love with a scholar, and bears witness to the licentiousness in her master's household.
- "The Solace of Guilt": 47-year-old Andrew nurses a guilty conscience for causing the death of a Thai child prostitute.
- "The Revenge": A mother teaches a daughter to cut off a man's organ for having his way with the daughter.
- "The Feast of the Hungry Ghosts": The Feast provides the well-needed food for a homeless woman and her brood of children.
- "Transit to Heaven": Feminist author Dora Warren gets a glimpse of women's heaven, who are divided into the E-Station (Egg) and the S-Station (Scorpion).
