= Ming Arcade =

Defunct shopping mall in Orchard Road, Singapore

- 明苑
- Location: Orchard Road, Singapore
- Coordinates: 1.306243°N 103.828051°E
- Address: 21 Cuscaden Road, Singapore
- Opened: 1982
- Demolished: 2026
- Developer: Ming Arcade Group
- Architect: Akitek Tenggara (Tay Kheng Soon and Chung Meng Ker)
- Num. of stores: 88
- Floors: 10

The Ming Arcade (Chinese: 明苑; pinyin: Míngyuàn) was a shopping mall at Orchard Road, Singapore. Situated at a narrow strip of land between Cuscaden Road and Orchard Road, the mall had 88 units. The Ming Arcade architecture was described as "modernism with a twist", with the exterior having multi-coloured glass windows. The mall was also noted by several publications for its music culture.

Plans for the Ming Arcade were outlined in January 1979. It was expected that the mall was to attract many tourists, with more than half of the mall's units already booked by February. The Ming Arcade opened in 1982, though was largely empty throughout the 1980s due to competition from newer malls. Between 2006 to 2024, the shopping centre put for sale several times before being sold to The Royal Group, who demolished the Ming Arcade in 2026 and, as of July 2026, are building a hotel on the site.

== History ==
The People's Park Group announced plans for the Ming Arcade as its second retail project in January 1979. The project was expected to be completed by the middle of 1980, and according to The Business Times, the Ming Arcade was to "tap a large portion of the tourist trade". Piling work for the mall began in February. By then, more than half of the Ming Arcade's shops were booked out. The contract to build the Ming Arcade was awarded to Fong Lee Construction for S$7.5 million (1979) (US$3.45 million) in April. During construction, the developers of the Ming Arcade were sued by the Ming Court Hotel, who alleged that the piling works of the Ming Arcade caused cracks in the hotel car park's walls and drain. However, the lawyers representing the Ming Arcade noted that the cracks were already present prior to the Ming Arcade's construction.

External Media
- Artist's impression of the Ming Arcade

The Ming Arcade opened in 1982 and won the 1983 Singapore Institute of Architects's Design Merit Award. By March 1984, M. Gretchen and Angeline Tan of The Straits Times noted that newer malls in Orchard Road were attracting more customers away from older shopping centres, with the Ming Arcade being one of the newer, smaller malls that was more affected compared to the older shopping centres. They also observed that there were more shuttered stores in the Ming Arcade compared to those that are in business. In another Straits Times article, the mall was reported to be "virtually empty" despite the cost of rent dropping. The Business Times in 1989 identified the Ming Arcade to be part of the "first-wave of retail developments [at Orchard Road] in the late-1970s and early-1980s that were disposed as quickly as they were built".

By August 2006, there were plans to put the Ming Arcade up for sale. The real estate company Jones Lang LaSalle put the mall up for sale by the next month – the newspaper Today noted in February 2007 that the only businesses open at the Ming Arcade was a tattoo parlor and a Malay eatery, with the rest shuttered down or turned into storage spaces. The newspaper also noted that during the night, "it was not unusual to see skimpily-clad women parading the [Ming Arcade]". By April 2007, the Ming Arcade was sold to Hotel Properties Limited. In 2018, 59 units of the mall was put up for sale. By then, the remaining shops were mostly pubs or entertainment outlets. The Ming Arcade was put for sale by Savills Singapore in November 2022, and was sold to The Royal Group for S$172 million (2022) (US$124.76 million) a month later. The group demolished Ming Arcade by 2026, and as of July 2026, The Royal Group is building a hotel on the former site of the mall, which is expected to be open by 2027.

== Details ==
The Ming Arcade was a shopping mall located at a narrow plot of land, approximately 1,126 square metres (12,123 sq ft), near the junction of Cuscaden Road and Orchard Road – the National Heritage Board's website ROOTS described the location as "the 'quiet' end of [Orchard Road]". ROOTS also noted that compared to nearby buildings, the Ming Arcade appeared to be "unobtrusive, blending into the background". The mall was noted by ROOTS and The Straits Times for its music scene, with the former stating that by 2018, the Ming Arcade was "once a hotbed for Singapore’s rock music scene". The shopping mall had 88 units, with one such business being The Rainbow Lounge, a nightclub and bar founded by the poet Goh Poh Seng. Described by The Straits Times as Singapore's "first theatre-disco lounge and music venue", The Rainbow Lounge hosted local acts such as The Quests and Tokyo Square, but following "indecent acts" committed by a pop group act, the lounge was closed in 1983.

The Ming Arcade was designed by Tay Kheng Soon and Chung Meng Ker of Akitek Tenggara, who centred the mall around the vertical open plan concept; the mall had ten floors comprising seven storeys and three basement levels. Each floor was connected by an escalator – the shopping centre had 19 escalators in total. The mall also had three lifts, two of which were glass-fronted. The architecture of the Ming Arcade is, according to ROOTS, "modernism with a twist" as its "rectilinear volumes and colours [were] surprisingly interjected with contrasting elements for a break from the otherwise-bland design". The shopping mall's exterior consisted of multi-coloured glass windows – during the day the glass windows produced a "reverse mirror" effect, but at night, allow the mall's interior lighting to be visible on the outside.
