= The Bondmaid =

1998 novel by Catherine Lim

- Author: Catherine Lim
- Publisher: Overlook
- Publication date: October 23, 1997
- ISBN: 0-87951-790-5

The Bondmaid is 1998 novel by Catherine Lim, which tells a tragic love story of Wu, the master of a household, and Han, his maid, in 1950s Singapore.

== Plot ==
Sold into servitude at age of four by her own mother and treated harshly by fellow bondmaids, Han forms a bond with Wu, who is the grandson of a head housemaid. Their friendship becomes doomed love when Wu moves to the United States, and Han find herself stuck with jealous bondmaids and Wu's relatives in Singapore. Both face additional trials until Han's death. The book ends when Wu and Han's son enters the household.
