= Little Ironies: Stories of Singapore =

First edition

Little Ironies: Stories of Singapore is a collection of seventeen short stories by Singapore author Catherine Lim. It was first published in 1978 in Singapore by Heinemann under the Writing in Asia Series and earned the writer many accolades. It is Lim's first published book of fiction. Little Ironies was later used as a set text for GCE 'N' Levels.

In 2015, Little Ironies: Stories of Singapore was selected by The Business Times as one of the Top 10 English Singapore books from 1965 to 2015, alongside titles by Arthur Yap and Daren Shiau. In the same year, The Straits Times' Akshita Nanda selected Little Ironies as one of 10 classic Singapore books. "Catherine Lim's early short, sharp fiction describes the results of such social engineering", she wrote, "a Singapore growing more cosmopolitan and Singaporeans losing touch with their roots. Little Ironies spotlights ordinary people at their best and worst, such as 'The Taximan's Story', in which a cab driver is happy to make money off sex workers while looking down on them."

In 2018, the book was included in the syllabus for literature for both GCE 'O' Levels and 'A' Levels.

== Works about Little Ironies ==
- Tan, Kheng Choo; Thomson, Ruth J; Lim, Catherine (1986). Student's Guide to Little Ironies. Singapore: G Brash.
