= My Family series 2 =

My Family
- Series 2
- My Family Series 2 DVD Cover
- No. of episodes: 13

Release
- Original network: BBC One
- Original release: 31 August – 30 November 2001

Series chronology
- ← Previous; 1 Next → 3

The second series of the BBC family sitcom My Family originally aired between 31 August and 30 November 2001. The second series was commissioned after good ratings from the first series. The opening episode, "All Roads Lead To Ramon", re-introduces the five main characters from the first series, with the addition of Brian, played by Kevin Bishop, who appeared in nearly every episode in the series. All thirteen episodes in series two are thirty minutes in length. The series was produced by Rude Boy Productions, a company that produces comedies created by Fred Barron. The series was filmed at Pinewood Studios in London, in front of a live audience.

== Episode information ==
No. overall	No. in series	Title	Directed by	Written by	Original release date	UK viewers (millions)
9	1	"All Roads Lead to Ramon"	Dewi Humphreys	James Hendrie and Ian Brown	31 August 2001	8.94
When Nick is sacked from an employment agency for being unemployable, Susan gives him a job as a tour guide, which proves a disaster. Ben has dental assistant problems. The agency sends him a temporary assistant, Ramon, who turns out to be Nick in disguise. When Janey has a different boy round each day, each one tutoring in her A-Levels, Ben tries to talk her out of it, likening what she is doing prostitution, which offends her. Stupid Brian (Kevin Bishop) fails in his attempt to win Janey back.
10	2	"The Unkindest Cut"	Dewi Humphreys	Steve Armogida and Jim Armogida	7 September 2001	9.04
After a weekend together in Paris, Susan thinks she is pregnant. After discussing whether to have the baby or not, Susan finds out she is not, but insists Ben has a vasectomy so it does not happen again. Nick copies Jamie Oliver and becomes a "naked chef".
11	3	"Parisian Beauty"	Dewi Humphreys	Andrea Solomons	14 September 2001	8.24
As part of a student exchange programme, Sylvie, a pretty 17-year-old French exchange student, comes to stay with the Harpers, but Janey is only doing it so she can go to Paris with Stupid Brian in return. Sylvie's arrival causes disarray – Michael has to stay in Nick's room and as a result turns into a virtual clone of his older brother and Nick tries to impress Sylvie using a number of different guises. Everything seems to be going well until Ben thinks Sylvie is attracted to him – until she corrects him.
12	4	"Trust Never Sleeps"	Dewi Humphreys	James Hendrie and Ian Brown	21 September 2001	9.55
Janey has achieved an A for French and would like a party at home. Susan says as she trusts Janey she can have one while they are away visiting friends in Oxford, but Ben is opposed to the party. Ben and Susan leave for Oxford, but on the way they stop at an off-licence and Ben overhears the salesman talking about a girl whose parents are foolish enough to leave her alone to have a party. They decide to sneak home and make sure all is well, and end up having to retreat to their bedroom and hide – they do not want to be discovered by Janey, as she will think they do not trust her.
13	5	"Death and Ben Take a Holiday"	Dewi Humphreys	Fred Barron	28 September 2001	9.65
Ben's Aunt Margaret has died. Susan is in bed with the flu, so he takes one of the kids, he first tries to persuade Michael, and then Janey, to go to the funeral in Leeds with him. They refuse, but Nick asks to come instead. Arriving at the hotel, it seems Ben has brought death on holiday with him, with body bags being taken out of the hotel and then the remains of a crime scene in his bedroom. Janey gives some pills to Susan which she received from Stupid Brian and persuades her to take them. They seem to have a positive effect, but arriving at the hotel, Susan finds Nick's date in bed with him and Ben, and to make matters worse, the pills start to have a strange effect on Susan at the funeral.
14	6	"Driving Miss Crazy"	Dewi Humphreys	James Hendrie and Ian Brown	5 October 2001	11.00
Janey is revising for her driving test, while Ben is having disagreements with his neighbour Mr Casey (Nickolas Grace) and his dog, Gemma, who often soils the Harper's porch. Mr Casey frequently complains about Ben's scruffy shed, untidy garden and other things. Both Ben and Mr Casey refuse to back down, and a huge argument ensues. Guest: Mr Casey (1st of 3 appearances)
15	7	"I Second That Emulsion"	Dewi Humphreys	James Hendrie and Ian Brown	12 October 2001	11.16
Susan decides to redecorate the living room, and Stupid Brian offers to do the job, but Susan has problems deciding what colour to paint it, and to make matters worse, Ben goes to a paint shop only to discover Nick working there, who persuades him to buy some. At home, Ben discovers it is the wrong colour. After all of the commotion with the paint, Brian still cannot start decorating the living room, so Janey asks him to stay for the 'day, night and whatever', much to the horror of her parents. Janey comes downstairs to take Brian up to bed. Brian confesses to Ben he does not know what to do about staying over. Ben says he does not want to know but suggests he pretends to leave, and then climb through Janey's window.
16	8	"Age of Romance"	Dewi Humphreys	James Hendrie and Ian Brown	19 October 2001	11.22
Michael has a new computer and Janey is starting to feel neglected. Nick is enjoying a fling with a much older woman, Amanda – whom he tells Susan he is going to marry. Ben and Susan try to talk him into ending the relationship, and Susan is horrified when she discovers Amanda is married. Amanda visits the house, during which time Susan is hostile towards her due to Amanda's age and marital status. Within days, Nick tells Susan that Amanda ended the affair due to her dislike of Susan and Ben. A stranger – apparently Amanda's husband – knocks on the Harpers' door and punches Ben in the face when he opens it.
17	9	"Get Cartier"	Dewi Humphreys	Fred Barron	26 October 2001	11.05
When Ben gets a new patient, Mr Smith (Michael Attwell), he suspects that he is an "underworld kingpin", although Mr Smith says his business is "organised dance and waste removal". Ben becomes more sure of that when he receives expensive gifts. When Susan finds one of them, a Cartier watch, she thinks Ben has bought it for her for their upcoming 23rd wedding anniversary. Ben buys a similar watch to give it to Mr Smith, and is shocked when Mr Smith tells him that the one he gave Ben is a fake.
18	10	"'Tis a Pity She's a Whore"	Dewi Humphreys	Steve Armogida and Jim Armogida	2 November 2001	11.06
When Susan's mother (Avril Elgar) rings and again claims to be dying, Janey visits her. She tells Janey that her mother Mary was a prostitute, which shocks Ben, who was unaware of that. Michael is standing in the school elections as a Conservative, much to Ben's annoyance, as he claims it is a "Labour household". Michael manages to get Ben a park bench with his name on it. Ben is proud of it and visits it. He encounters two prostitutes on it, and a policeman arrives, thinking him to be soliciting them for sex.
19	11	"The Last Supper"	Dewi Humphreys	Steve Armogida and Jim Armogida	9 November 2001	12.54
Scott Tailor (Mac McDonald), Susan's new American boss, visits for dinner. After arguing with him about his new ideas, which includes her dressing up as a Beatle, she triggers his acid reflux disease so he has to sleep in their bed overnight. When he dies in his sleep, Susan thinks she argued him to death and goes to a priest (Andy Greenhalgh) to confess. Nick dates a policewoman (Kaye Wragg).
20	12	"Ben Wants to Be a Millionaire"	Dewi Humphreys	Steve Armogida and Jim Armogida	23 November 2001	11.22
Ben and Susan go out to dinner with a multi-millionaire old school friend of his, Andy Banks (Daniel Hill), and his young wife Ambyr (Kim Ross), who is going to have cosmetic surgery. After taking advice from Andy and an Internet forum, both Ben and Susan invest in the stock market; they both quickly lose a lot of money. Susan is learning Russian for a new tour group. Janey wants Prada shoes. Nick fails in his attempts to start two new jobs: selling his organs on eBay, and being a sperm donor.
21	13	"Breakable"	Dewi Humphreys	James Hendrie and Ian Brown	30 November 2001	11.15
Susan finds £1,255 in Nick's trousers, which he uses to buy a motorcycle so he can form a motorcycle stunt display team called The League of Mentalmen. His first performance is at the Peterborough Rock Festival, where he is injured when he launches himself off a ramp and hits a cow. He is taken to hospital with a broken arm, leg, three ribs and whiplash. Susan visits him and persuades Ben to act fatherly to his son, making him converse with Nick and give him his beloved childhood toy, Sir Edworth Tedworth. She also tries to make Ben tell Nick that he loves him. Janey starts a new job as a waitress in Soho and hopes to be discovered by film producers, but is instead sacked for her bad attitude.

== Reception ==
=== Viewers ===
Upon the success of appearing in a prime-time Friday evening slot, the second series was given the same slot for the majority of episodes. The series continued to be a hit with viewers, with the first episode of the series gaining 8.95 million viewers, the second highest rating for the week. The second series averaged 10.38 million viewers for each episode.

Rank	Episode	Viewership
1	The Last Supper	12.54 million
2–3	Ben Wants to Be a Millionaire; Age of Romance	11.22 million
4	I Second That Emulsion	11.16 million
5	Breakable	11.15 million
6	Tis a Pity She's a Whore	11.06 million
7	Get Cartier	11.05 million
8	Driving Miss Crazy	11.00 million
9	Death and Ben Take a Holiday	9.65 million
10	Trust Never Sleeps	9.55 million
11	The Unkindest Cut	9.04 million
12	All Roads Lead to Ramon	8.95 million
13	Parisian Beauty	8.24 million
