= Ly Singko =

Chinese-Singaporean journalist (1913–1996)

Ly Singko (Chinese: 李星可; pinyin: Lǐ Xīngkě; 1913 – 17 February 1996) was a Chinese-born writer who spent most of his career as a journalist in Singapore. From 1971 to 1973, he was detained under the Internal Security Act for "glamourising the communist system". Ly left Singapore after being released and died of a stroke aged 82.

== Early life ==
Ly was born in Beijing, China, in 1913 and was raised in a Catholic household. He attended Peking University, before moving to Belgium and France to read philosophy at the Catholic University of Leuven and the University of Paris.

== Career ==
Ly returned to China shortly after the Second Sino-Japanese War began, first serving as a French translator for the Chinese Air Force before working for both the Kuomintang-led Central News Agency and a Chongqing-based French agency. Ly was one of the founding members of the Society for Chinese and Foreign Writers (中外文藝聯絡社), also based in Chongqing. He was later posted to Saigon as the Central News Agency's Vietnamese correspondent.

However, following the communist takeover of China in 1949, Ly was advised by Paul Yu Pin, the archbishop of Nanking, to relocate to Singapore and assist with the running of the Catholic Church–affiliated newspaper Ih Shih Pao (益世報). Its first issue launched in June 1952 but Ly resigned as the newspaper's chief editor less than two months later. In 1959, he joined Sin Chew Jit Poh as a columnist and remained there for eleven years, before switching over to Nanyang Siang Pau—then the largest Chinese-language newspaper in Singapore—in February 1971.

== Imprisonment ==
On 2 May 1971, Ly and three other high-ranking Nanyang Siang Pau personnel—general manager Lee Mau Seng, editor-in-chief Shamsuddin Tung Tao Chang, and public relations officer Kerk Loong Sing—were arrested by officials from the Internal Security Department for their suspected involvement in pro-communist activities. Jek Yeun Thong, the minister of culture, called Ly a "militantly chauvinistic writer" and accused him of actively "glamourising the communist system and working up communal emotions over Chinese language and culture". Moreover, Jek alleged that Ly had been offered "almost double" his salary at Sin Chew Jit Poh by Nanyang Siang Pau chairman Lee Eu Seng, so as to "induce" Ly into writing anti-establishment op-eds that were "highly offensive and provocative in nature".

The Ministry of Home Affairs announced on 22 May 1971 that Ly and his Nanyang Siang Pau colleagues had admitted during questioning to the charges of "glamourising the communist system". Ly was imprisoned without trial under the Internal Security Act from 22 May 1971 to 26 January 1973.

== Later years ==
After his release, Ly did not return to journalism and spent most of his later years back in France, where he taught Asian cultural studies at the University of Paris, as well as Australia, where his wife Anna (d. 1987) and four sons and two daughters resided. On 15 December 1976, he was awarded the rank of Knight in the Ordre national du Mérite by the French government. In January 1995, Ly returned to Singapore to donate his collection of Peking opera memorabilia to the National Museum of Singapore. Ly died of a stroke in the early hours of 17 February 1996 in Sydney, aged 82. His funeral was held three days later.

== Works ==
Ly edited and translated stories for An Anthology of Modern Malaysian Chinese Stories (1967) and translated Reunion & Other Stories (1980) for Heinemann Educational Books (Asia)'s Writing in Asia Series.
