= Catherine Lim =

Singaporean fiction author (born 1942)

Catherine Lim (林宝音)
- Born: 21 March 1942 (age 84); Penang, British Malaya
- Occupations: Writer, teacher
- Notable work: Little Ironies: Short Stories of Singapore and Or Else, The Lightning God and Other Stories.
- Website: catherinelim.sg

Catherine Lim Poh Imm (Chinese: 林宝音; pinyin: Lín Bǎoyīn, born 21 March 1942) is a Singaporean fiction author known for writing about Singapore society and of themes of traditional Chinese culture. Hailed as the "doyenne of Singapore writers", Lim has published nine collections of short stories, five novels, two poetry collections, and numerous political commentaries to date. Her social commentary in 1994, titled The PAP and the people - A Great Affective Divide and published in The Straits Times, criticised the ruling political party's agendas.

== Career ==
Lim was born in Kulim (Malaya) and studied in the Convent of the Holy Infant Jesus. Early childhood reading was mainly influenced by British fiction, including Enid Blyton, Richmal Crompton and some comics.

She received her Bachelor of Arts degree from the University of Malaya in 1963, moving to Singapore in 1967. In 1988, she received her PhD in applied linguistics from the National University of Singapore. Lim then attended Columbia University and the University of California, Berkeley as a Fulbright scholar (1990). She also worked as a teacher and later as project director with the Curriculum Development Institute of Singapore and as a specialist lecturer with the Regional English Language Centre, teaching sociolinguistics and literature. In 1992, she left her professional career to become a full-time writer. Lim was subsequently made a Chevalier of the Ordre des Arts et des Lettres (French award given for contributions to the arts) in 2003 and an ambassador of the Hans Christian Andersen Foundation in 2005. She received an honorary doctorate in literature from Murdoch University.

Lim published her first short story collection called Little Ironies: Stories of Singapore in 1978. A succeeding collection, Or Else, the Lightning God and other Stories, was published in 1980. The short story collection was the first Singapore book to be tested for the Cambridge International Examinations in 1989 and 1990. Another story collection that followed in this tradition was O Singapore!: Stories in Celebration from 1989, but two years earlier she published The Shadow of a Shadow of a Dream, which found Lim experimenting with new techniques and extending her subject range.

Her first novel, The Serpent's Tooth, was published in 1982. Other books that have been published since then include The Bondmaid (1995) and Following the Wrong God Home (2001). The major theme in her stories is the role of women in traditional Chinese society and culture. In 1998 Lim was awarded the Montblanc-NUS Centre for the Arts Literary Award and in 1999 she received the S.E.A. Write Award.

In 2000, Lim worked with the now-defunct web portal Lycos Asia to write an e-novella called Leap of Love. It was sold online (at 19 cents a chapter) before it was published by Horizon Books in 2003. It served as basis for the film The Leap Years by Raintree Pictures in 2008.

Another best-selling novel was The Bondmaid, which sold 75,000 copies.

In 2014, Lim was inducted into the Singapore Women's Hall of Fame.

In 2015, Little Ironies: Stories of Singapore was selected by The Business Times as one of the Top 10 English Singapore books from 1965 to 2015, alongside titles by Arthur Yap and Daren Shiau. In the same year, The Straits Times' Akshita Nanda selected Little Ironies: Stories of Singapore as one of 10 classic Singapore books. "Catherine Lim's early short, sharp fiction describes the results of such social engineering", she wrote, "a Singapore growing more cosmopolitan and Singaporeans losing touch with their roots. Little Ironies spotlights ordinary people at their best and worst, such as 'The Taximan's Story', in which a cab driver is happy to make money off sex workers while looking down on them."

== Incident ==
Lim came into conflict with the People's Action Party (PAP) in 1994 when she wrote an article published in The Straits Times (PAP and the People: A Great Affective Divide). From comments made by then Prime Minister Goh Chok Tong and other cabinet ministers, especially George Yeo, this episode gave rise to the political "out of bounds" marker that came to be known as "boh tua boh suay" (literally, "no big, no small" in the Chinese dialect of Hokkien, to mean "no respect for rank and seniority"). Lee Kuan Yew dismissed Lim's views as "the popular theory that the Western press writes about".

== Works ==
=== Novels ===
- The Serpent's Tooth (1982, Times Books International) ISBN 9812042113
- The Bondmaid (1995, C. Lim Pub; 1997, 1998, Orion; 1997, 1998, The Overlook Press; 2011, Marshall Cavendish Editions) ISBN 9810072953 ISBN 0752807501 ISBN 9789814346207
- The Teardrop Story Woman (1998, Orion; 2011, Marshall Cavendish Editions) ISBN 9789814346214
- Following the Wrong God Home (2001, Orion Publishing; 2001, Allen & Unwin; 2011, Marshall Cavendish Editions) ISBN 0752841203 ISBN 9789814346221
- A Leap of Love: A Novella (2003, Horizon Books) ISBN 9789810805944
- The Song of Silver Frond (2003, Orion; 2011, Marshall Cavendish Editions) ISBN 9789814346238
- Miss Seetoh in the World (2011, Marshall Cavendish Editions) ISBN 9789814328364

=== Short story collections ===
- Little Ironies: Stories of Singapore (1978, Heinemann Asia) ISBN 9971640295
- Or Else, the Lightning God and Other Stories (1980, Heinemann Asia; 1988, Federal Publications; 2012, Heinemann) ISBN 9971640147 ISBN 981017621X ISBN 9789810624699
- They Do Return...But Gently Lead Them Back (1983, Times Books International) ISBN 9812042032
- The Shadow of a Shadow of a Dream: Love Stories of Singapore (1987, Heinemann Asia; 1999, Horizon Books) ISBN 9971641186 ISBN 9810412509
- O Singapore! Stories in Celebration (1989, Times Books International) ISBN 9812041362
- Deadline for Love and Other Stories (1992, Heinemann Asia; 1999, Horizon Books) ISBN 9810412495
- Meet Me on the Queen Elizabeth 2! (1993, Heinemann Asia; 1999, Horizon Books) ISBN 9971643324 ISBN 9810412517
- The Best of Catherine Lim (1993, Heinemann Asia) ISBN 9971643359
- The Woman's Book of Superlatives (1993, Times Books International) ISBN 9812044019
- The Howling Silence: tales of the dead and their return (1999, Horizon Books) ISBN 9810417780
- The Catherine Lim Collection (2009, Marshall Cavendish Editions) ISBN 9789812618566

=== Poetry ===
- Love's Lonely Impulses (1992, Heinemann Asia) ISBN 9971642840
- Humoresque (2006, Horizon Books) ISBN 9810559593

=== Non-fiction ===
- Unhurried Thoughts At My Funeral (2005, Horizon Books) ISBN 9810523068
- A Watershed Election: Singapore's GE 2011 (2011, Marshall Cavendish Editions) ISBN 9789814351706
- Roll Out the Champagne, Singapore!: An Exuberant Celebration of the Nation's 50th Birthday (2014, Marshall Cavendish Editions) ISBN 9789814561587
- An Equal Joy: Reflections on God, Death and Belonging (2017, Marshall Cavendish Editions) ISBN 9789814771795

=== Plays ===
- Kampong Amber (1994)

=== Anthologies ===
- Gwee Li Sui, ed. Written Country: The History of Singapore through Literature (2016, Landmark Publications) ISBN 9789814189668
