= O Singapore!: Stories in Celebration =

First edition

O Singapore! Stories in Celebration is a satirical short story collection written by Singaporean writer Catherine Lim, first published in 1989 by Times Edition Pte Ltd. The stories are meant to poke fun of the parochial Singaporean government and its people.

In 1990, Lim won the National Book Council Development (Fiction) (Commendation) for the collection.

== Plot summaries ==
- "The Malady and The Cure": A civil servant, school principal Mr Sai Koh Phan, is wracked by a painful malady which incapacitates him. He is horrified by the prescribed cure – going against the admonitions of the ruling political party.
- "Sorry...Temporary Aberrations": The Vice-Counsul is affected by spells of leering jokes during his public speeches, and traces the cause to a Chinese young man affected by hereditary licentiousness.
- "Kiasuim: A Socio-Historico-Cultural Perspective": A Caucasian professor writes an anthropological paper on the most salient phenomenon on Singapore soil: kiasuism.
- "In Search of (A Play)": An unmarried couple, the westernized Miss Sharilyn Zelda Lee Swee Mei and Chinese-educated Mr Chow Pock Mook, are aghast at their dates as arranged by the nation's Social Enhancement Unit (SEU).
- "Goonalaan's Beard": An Indian keeps his beard uncut and unwashed to protest over Singaporeans' spinelessness and materialism.
- "A Singapore Fairy Tale": A young man has to stump the Wise Man of Singapore in order to marry the most beautiful princess in the country.
- "The Concatenation": Mr Wong Cheer Kia and Mrs Esther Wong debate whether to have another child.
- "'Write, Right, Rite'; Or 'How Catherine Lim Tries to Offer only the Best on the Altar of Good Singapore Writing'": The author tries to write the Great Singapore Short Story for the International Writer's Conference in Oslo, only to be inundated by protests and requests from Singapore's various statutory departments.
