= My Family series 1 =

My Family
- Series 1
- My Family Series 1 DVD Cover
- No. of episodes: 8

Release
- Original network: BBC One
- Original release: 19 September – 7 November 2000

Series chronology
- Next → 2

The first series of BBC family sitcom My Family originally aired between 19 September and 7 November 2000. The first episode of the series, and the pilot episode, is entitled "The Serpent's Tooth". All eight episodes in the first series are thirty minutes long. The first episode introduces the five main characters that regularly appear in the series: Robert Lindsay, who plays Ben, Zoë Wanamaker, who plays Susan, Kris Marshall, who plays Nick, Daniela Denby-Ashe, who plays Janey, and Gabriel Thomson, who plays Michael. A further regular member of the cast is Brigitte, played by Daisy Donovan, who appears in nearly every episode of the series. The series was produced by Rude Boy Productions, a company that produces comedies created by Fred Barron. Series 1 was the only series to be filmed at BBC Television Centre in London.

== Episode information ==
No. overall	No. in series	Title	Directed by	Written by	Original release date	UK viewers (millions)
1	1	"The Serpent's Tooth"	Baz Taylor	James Hendrie and Ian Brown	19 September 2000	8.48
Ben (Robert Lindsay) becomes angry when his daughter Janey (Daniela Denby-Ashe) tells him she is seeing another dentist, Australian Mel Fraser, because Ben never gets round to seeing them. Ben soon discovers that his wife Susan (Zoë Wanamaker) has had work done on her teeth by Mel, causing them to argue. They then have to reassure their younger son Michael (Gabriel Thomson) that they are not going to divorce. Janey, who was attracted to Mel, says she will not see him again after he treated her like a child. Elder son Nick (Kris Marshall) meets Isabelle (Karine Adrover), a French swimwear model, on the internet. Nick's previous internet acquaintance – an 'attractive, female, 19-year-old cellist from Prague' – turned out to be a 48-year-old man from Sunderland. Ben bets him £50 that Isabelle is not who she says she is, and so Nick invites her round. She is who she claims, but Nick had lured her there by pretending to be female. Michael rebels by buying himself a rabbit called Hannibal. First appearances of: Ben Harper, Susan Harper, Nick Harper, Janey Harper, Michael Harper and Brigitte.
2	2	"Pain in the Class"	Baz Taylor	James Hendrie and Ian Brown	26 September 2000	7.46
Janey has a tattoo of a scorpion, which Susan disapproves of. Nick wants to be a dot-com millionaire and it also soon transpires that Michael is being bullied at school by Jason Hodder, and his reason for not telling Ben and Susan is that Ben would not react and Susan would overreact. Later on the following day, Ben receives a phone call from Susan telling him that there is a problem – Michael is covered in custard, Susan decides to call Jason's parents (Brian Pettifer and Janine Duvitski) who visit but refuse to do anything about Jason's behaviour, then the parents are scared out of the house by an angry Ben who is hitting them with a rolled up magazine. The next day, Michael is late home from school and Susan starts to worry that he is lying in a ditch somewhere but soon discovers that Janey and Michael had beaten Jason up.
3	3	"Droit de Seigneur Ben"	Baz Taylor	Fred Barron and Shawn Schepps	3 October 2000	5.95
At the surgery, Ben is attending to one of his patients, Lord Whitten, whom Brigitte seems to be a big fan of. They begin talking about various subjects include his 17-year-old son Toby, whom he would like to go on a date with a girl. At first he asks Brigitte, but she says that she is celibate and suggests Janey, who, when she finds out, is furious that Ben has set her up on a blind date. Janey is delighted when she finds out that there is a picture of him and his family in Hello! magazine and that he is rich and handsome. Janey is angry when Toby tries to have sex with her during the date, and tells Susan, who tells Ben. When Whitten's son comes into the surgery, Ben assumes he is Toby, until he tells Ben that he is Toby's gay brother James. Ben is shocked when Janey tells him that she is not a virgin.
4	4	"The Last Resort"	Baz Taylor	Steve Armogida, Jim Armogida, Ian Brown and James Hendrie	10 October 2000	5.42
Susan is not looking forward to turning 40 (again). Ben is unsure of what to give her, until Janey assures him that Susan wants to go on a romantic weekend away – just the two of them. At first, Ben is reluctant, as he does not like travelling, but Janey pressures him to talk to Susan. Initially his ideas of where to go do not please her, but she suggests the B&B that they stayed at just before they married. Arriving at the B&B, they find little has changed in the room they stayed at some twenty-two years ago, although some of the staff from then are dead and one is in prison. They fail to revitalise their marriage, and are envious of the passionate couple whom they can hear in the next room. When they meet the couple in the dining room, they are surprised to see that they are older than them. They are even more surprised to learn that the older couple are swingers who want to have casual sex with them.
5	5	"Farewell to Alarms"	Baz Taylor	Steve Armogida and Jim Armogida	17 October 2000	6.89
Susan is worried about the rising crime rate in the area and after a series of events including Brigitte's van (allegedly) being stolen and a stranger strolling around the house after Nick decided to become a landlord, she decides the time has come to get an expensive top-of-the-range alarm. After night-on-night of the alarm going off due to various problems, Ben's had enough of the sleepless nights and decides to turn off the alarm. What should just be a simple task of turning off the alarm soon turns into Mission Impossible and Ben is forced to clamber over furniture and make all sorts of other ridiculous movements just to try to get back to his bedroom without setting off the alarm.
6	6	"Death Takes a Policy"	Baz Taylor	Fred Barron and Penny Croft	24 October 2000	6.19
A Chinese businessman goes missing on a tour of Madame Tussauds and when he is later found dead, Susan begins to worry about the effect on the kids as it is their "first death", even though they've never even met Mr Chen or been to Madame Tussauds. Later that evening at dinner, Nick reveals that he has offered his latest would-be job to Emily Foster, someone who he really likes and someone who also wants a chance to sell life insurance, so Nick suggests Ben, although to his shock, Susan has already apparently bought life insurance from him. At first, he is hesitant to let her come round, but after Nick persuades him (telling him there might even be a chance of moving out) Ben is all for it.
7	7	"The Awkward Phase"	Baz Taylor	Fred Barron	30 October 2000	8.38
Nick is trying to teach Michael how to act on his first time out with a girl: the rules etc. He has also fixed Ben's chair though Ben forbade him to ever touch anything of his ever again, and when he later tells Ben that he fixed his chair, Ben goes off into a rant about how he just wants him to leave everything alone. Susan just puts Nick latest behaviour of trying to fix things down to an awkward phase, but Ben disagrees: twenty years is not a phase, it is him.
8	8	"Much Ado About Ben"	Baz Taylor	Steve Armogida and Jim Armogida	7 November 2000	7.62
After taking Viagra which Susan found in Nick's pocket, Ben ends up in hospital. Soon after, Susan forces him to go on a diet for the good of his health, which he detests. After being given a book by Brigitte about her guru (Dave, who is also a part-time builder) who had a near-death experience which completely changed his life, Ben returns home. He scares his family even more than the events of the previous night, because he is in a good mood. To top it all off, he is singing. Last appearance of: Brigitte

== Reception ==
=== Viewers ===
The series was given a mid-week time slot, originally airing on Tuesdays at 8:30pm. The series became an immediate hit with viewers, with the first episode gaining 8.48 million viewers, the sixth highest rating for the week. Ratings began to fall for the next three episodes, to a point where ratings for the fourth episode of the series failed to appear in the BBC's Top 30 programmes. However, when the series was moved to a prime-time slot on Friday evenings, beginning with Episode 5, ratings began to improve, with the seventh episode of the series reaching 8.38 million viewers. The first series averaged 7.04 million viewers for each episode.

Rank	Episode	Viewership
1	The Serpent's Tooth	8.48 million
2	The Awkward Phase	8.38 million
3	Much Ado About Ben	7.62 million
4	Pain in the Class	7.46 million
5	Farewell to Alarms	6.89 million
6	Death Takes a Policy	6.19 million
7	Droit de Seigneur Ben	5.95 million
8	The Last Resort	5.42 million

=== Critics ===
The series was openly criticised for its American roots, with the use of quick one-line jokes, compared to the more traditional built-up jokes of other British sitcoms.
