= Iwan Simatupang =

Indonesian writer

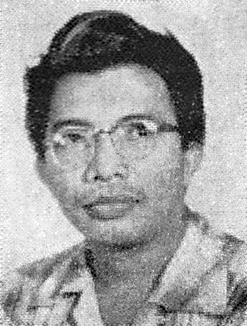
- Simatupang, 1954
- Born: Iwan Martua Lokot Dongan Simatupang; 18 January 1928; Sibolga, North Sumatra
- Died: 4 August 1970 (aged 42); Jakarta, Indonesia
- Occupation: Writer
- Spouse(s): Cornelia Astrid van Geem (1955), Tanneke Burki 1964
- Children: Ino Alda (1956), Ion Portibi (1957), Violetta Simatupang (1964)
- Writing career
- Language: Indonesian
- Genres: Novels, poetry

Iwan Martua Lokot Dongan Simatupang, more commonly known as Iwan Simatupang (18 January 1928 in Sibolga, North Sumatra – 4 August 1970 in Jakarta, Indonesia) was an Indonesian novelist, poet and essayist.

== Life and works ==
He joined the Indonesian Student Army (TRIP), becoming a Commander, and was captured in North Sumatra during Operation Kraai, against the Republic of Indonesia's temporary capital in Yogyakarta (1948/49). After he was released, he graduated from high school in Medan. He studied medicine at the Nederlandsch-Indische Artsen School in Surabaya but did not graduate. He then went to the Netherlands and studied anthropology at the University of Leiden from 1954 to 1956, followed by the Full Course of the International Institute of Social Studies at The Hague, 1957; and philosophy in Paris with Prof. Jean Wahl at the Sorbonne in 1958.

He worked as a high school teacher in Surabaya, also serving as editor of Siasat (Strategy) magazine, and the Warta Harian (Daily News) (1966–1970). His first writings were published in Siasat and Mimbar Indonesia (Indonesian Pulpit). In 1963, he won second prize from Sastra (Literature) magazine for his essay "Kebebasan Pengarang dan Masalah Tanah Air" (Writers' Freedom and the Problems of the Motherland). Most of his early works were short stories, poems and plays.

He wrote his first novel, Ziarah (The Pilgrim) in a month in 1960; the novel was published in Indonesia in 1969, and was awarded the first ASEAN Literary Award for the Novel in Bangkok in 1977. He wrote two novels in 1961, Merahnya Merah (Red in Red) was published in 1968 (and received a National Literary Award in 1970) and Kering (Drought) was published in 1972. According to Benedict Anderson, Iwan Simatupang and Putu Wijaya were the two "genuinely distinguished fictionalists" produced by Indonesia since Independence and both had a strong attachment to "magical realism".

== Selected works ==
- Bulan Bujur Sangkar (drama, 1960)
- Kebebasan Pengarang dan Masalah Tanah Air (essai, 1963)
- RT Nol/RW Nol (drama, 1966)
- Petang di Taman (drama, 1966, seharusnya judulnya Taman, diubah penerbit menjadi Petang di Taman),
- Merahnya Merah (novel, 1961, publ. 1968)
- Ziarah (novel, 1960, publ. 1969),
- Kering (novel, 1961, publ. 1972)
- Koong (novel, publ. 1975, Prize winner Yayasan Buku Utama Departeman P dan K, 1975)
- Tegak Lurus dengan Langit (collection of short stories, 1982, Ed. Dami N. Toda)
- Sejumlah Masalah Sastra (collection of essays, 1982, Ed. Satyagraha Hoerip)
- Surat-Surat Politik Iwan Simatupang 1964–1966 (1986, Ed. Frans M. Parera)
- Ziarah Malam (collection of poetry, 1993, Ed. Oyon Sofyan dan S. Samsoerizal Dar).
