= Robert Raymer =

American writer (born 1956)

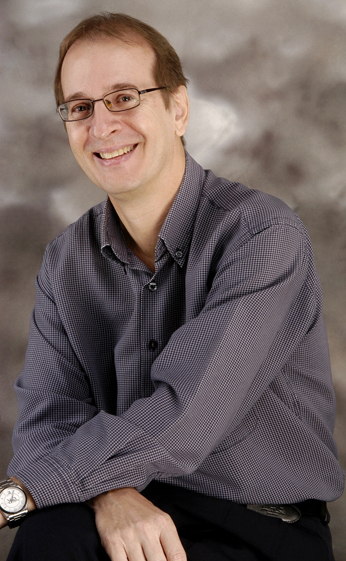
Robert Raymer in 2008

Robert Raymer (born August 3, 1956) is an American writer and writing facilitator from Grove City, Pennsylvania, who now lives in the Malaysian city of Kuching, in Sarawak.

== Biography ==
After graduating from Miami University in Oxford, Ohio, Raymer was a regional manager for Kinko, in charge of 11 stores in three states before moving to Penang, Malaysia where he lived for 21 years and taught creative writing at Universiti Sains Malaysia. He also taught creative writing at Universiti Malaysia Sarawak. He is the author of a collection of short stories set in Malaysia (Lovers and Strangers Revisited, MPH Group, 2008), a collection of creative nonfiction (Tropical Affairs, MPH, 2009), and a travel book (Spirit of Malaysia, Editions Didier Millet, 2011).

Named as one of the "50 Expats You Should Know in Malaysia" by Expatriate Lifestyle magazine (January 2010), Robert Raymer's short stories and articles have appeared in many publications including The Literary Review, London Magazine, Thema, Descant, The Writer and Reader's Digest. One story from Lovers and Strangers Revisited has been used for the Cambridge International Examinations and others have been taught in Malaysian universities, private colleges and Sijil Pelajaran Malaysia literature in secondary schools, as well as in a high school in Canada. He was the editor of Silverfish New Writings 4. Three of his novels have been "short-list" finalists in the 2009 and 2011 Faulkner-Wisdom Novel Competition.

== Publications ==
=== Lovers and Strangers Revisited ===
Lovers and Strangers Revisited (MPH, 2008), a collection of 17 short stories set mostly in Malaysia, was the winner of the 2009 Popular-The Star Reader's Choice Awards. The original collection, Lovers and Strangers, was published by Heinemann Asia (1993) under the Writing in Asia Series then republished as Lovers and Strangers Revised (Silverfish, 2005). The Story Behind the Story is a blog series about each story in the collection, starting with "On Fridays". The collection has been translated into French under the title Trois Autres Malaisie (Editions GOPE, 2011).

=== Tropical Affairs ===
Tropical Affairs: Episodes from an Expat's Life in Malaysia (MPH, 2009), nominated for the 2010 Popular-The Star Readers Choice Awards, is a collection of creative nonfiction about Raymer's experiences of living in Malaysia for over twenty years, including being an extra in three Hollywood films (Anna and the King, Paradise Road, Beyond Rangoon) and the French film, Indochine, which won an Academy Award for Best Foreign Language Film in 1992.

=== Spirit of Malaysia ===
Spirit of Malaysia (Editions Didier Millet, 2011) is a travel-guide, souvenir book with up-to-date photographs that capture the spirit of modern Malaysia.
