= Lloyd Fernando =

Malaysian author and professor

Lloyd Fernando (31 May 1926 – 28 February 2008) was a Malaysian author and professor at the University of Malaya in the English Department.

== Life ==
Lloyd Fernando was born to a Sinhalese family in Sri Lanka in 1926. In 1938, his family migrated to Singapore. Mr. Fernando was educated at St Patrick's in Singapore, with the Japanese occupation interrupting that education from 1943 to 1945. During the Japanese attack on Singapore, Mr. Fernando's father was killed. During the Japanese occupation, Fernando worked in a variety of manual labour jobs.

Lloyd Fernando thereafter graduated from the University of Malaya in Singapore, and subsequently served as an instructor at the Singapore Polytechnic. Lloyd Fernando became an assistant lecturer at the University of Malaya in Kuala Lumpur in 1960. Mr. Fernando was awarded a scholarship at Leeds University, UK where he received his PhD.

In 1967 Fernando was appointed to serve as a professor at the English Department of the University of Malaya, where he served until his retirement in 1978. Subsequently, Mr. Fernando studied law at City University in the United Kingdom and then at Middle Temple, returning to Malaysia with two law degrees, whereupon he was employed by a law firm, and thereafter started a separate law practice business. In 1997, Mr. Fernando had a stroke and ceased his professional activities.

One of his most successful novels is Green is the Colour (1993). It has been described as "a sensitive novel about racial and religious tolerance set against the shadow of the 1969 racial riot in Kuala Lumpur [also known as the 13 May incident] where four main characters, good young people from different ethnic groups, become friends and even fall in love". It has also been claimed that the use of Malaysian English in the novel serves as a political tool to indicate that different religious and ethnic groups in Malaysia may find a common language and a shared culture.

== Literary works ==
- Scorpion Orchid, 1976, ISBN 978-0-686-77802-8
- Cultures in Conflict, 1986, ISBN 978-9971-4-9021-8
- Green is the Colour, 1993, ISBN 978-981-3002-68-5
- Twenty-two Malaysian Stories: an anthology of writing in English (editor), 1968
- Malaysian Short Stories (editor), 1981
- "New Women" in the Late Victorian Novel, 1977, ISBN 978-0-271-01241-4
