= The Serpent's Tooth (novel) =

The Serpent's Tooth is a novel by Singaporean writer Catherine Lim, first published in 1982 by Times Books International. The title of the novel is taken from a quote from Shakespeare's King Lear: "Sharper than a serpent’s tooth/ It is to have a thankless child!"

== Plot ==
Angela is exasperated by the behaviour of her 71-year-old mother-in-law, nicknamed the Old One – of her superstitious ways and her doddering, foolish manners. The Old One has an adopted son who is an imbecile named Ah Bock. While Angela's elder son Mark does well in school and wins a prize in a national oratory competition, she is worried by the influence her mother-in-law wields over her younger son, Michael. She also has to endure her husband Wee Boon's three younger brothers, including one in Australia who has joined an fanatic Protestant cult.
