= Edwin Thumboo =

Singaporean poet and academic (born 1933)

- Born: Edwin Nadason Thumboo; 22 November 1933 (age 92); Mandai, Singapore, Straits Settlements
- Occupations: Emeritus professor, National University of Singapore
- Writing career
- Period: 20th century to present
- Genre: Poetry
- Notable work: Ulysses by the Merlion (1979)
- Notable awards: National Book Development Council of Singapore Award for poetry (1978, 1980, 1994), S.E.A. Write Award (1979), Cultural Medallion for Literature (1979), ASEAN Cultural and Communication Award (Literature) (1987), Bintang Bakti Masyarakat (Bar) (Public Service Star, 1981, 1991), Pingat Jasa Gemilang (Meritorious Services Medal, 2006)

Edwin Nadason Thumboo B.B.M. and Bar, PJG (born 22 November 1933) is a Singaporean poet and academic who is regarded as one of the pioneers of English literature in Singapore.

Thumboo graduated in English from the University of Malaya in 1956. Although he applied for a position at the university, he was rejected as few locals held academic posts at that time. He therefore worked in the civil service for about nine years before finally joining the university, which was then renamed the University of Singapore, in 1966 following Singapore's independence. He received a Ph.D. from the university in 1970. Thumboo rose to the position of full professor in the Department of English Language and Literature, heading the department between 1977 and 1993. After the merger of the University of Singapore and Nanyang University in 1980 to form the National University of Singapore (NUS), he was the Dean of the Faculty of Arts and Social Sciences from 1980 to 1991, NUS's longest-serving dean of the Faculty of Arts and Social Sciences. Thumboo was the first Chairman and Director of the university's Centre for the Arts from 1993 to 2005, and continues to be associated with the university as an emeritus professor, a position he has held since retiring from full-time teaching in September 1997.

Thumboo's poetry is inspired by myth and history, and he is often dubbed Singapore's unofficial poet laureate because of his poems with nationalistic themes. A pioneer of local English literature, he compiled and edited some of the first anthologies of English poetry and fiction from Singapore and Malaysia. His own collections of poetry include Rib of Earth (1956), Ulysses by the Merlion (1979) and A Third Map (1993). His latest anthology Still Travelling, consisting of almost 50 poems, was published in 2008. Thumboo has won the National Book Development Council of Singapore Book Awards for Poetry three times, in 1978, 1980 and 1994. He has also received the inaugural S.E.A. Write Award (1979), the first Cultural Medallion for Literature (1979), the Association of Southeast Asian Nations (ASEAN) Cultural and Communication Award (Literature) (1987), and the Raja Rao Award (2002). He was conferred a Bintang Bakti Masyarakat (Public Service Star) in 1981 with an additional Bar in 1991, and the Pingat Jasa Gemilang (Meritorious Services Medal) in 2006. He conceived the first National Poetry Festival for Singapore in 2015.

== Early years ==
Edwin Thumboo, born in colonial Singapore, Straits Settlements on 22 November 1933, was the eldest of eight children of a Tamil Indian schoolteacher and a Teochew-Peranakan Chinese housewife from a Singaporean merchant family. He and his siblings grew up speaking English and Teochew. The family was financially comfortable; their home in Mandai was the only one in the neighbourhood with electricity. Because of his mixed parentage, as a child he was sometimes called names and marginalized. This was said to have fostered determination and self-respect in him. He completed his primary education at Pasir Panjang Primary School in 1940. During the Japanese occupation of Singapore (1942–1945), he helped his family by selling cakes, tending goats, and working as a salesboy. Following the war, he studied at Monk's Hill Secondary School (finishing there in 1946) and Victoria School (1948). It was at the latter place that he began writing poetry at the age of 17 years, encouraged by the senior English master Shamus Frazer. Thumboo considers Frazer his spiritual father, and later dedicated Rib of Earth (1956), his first collection of poetry published while an undergraduate, to him. At this time, Thumboo was also a member of the Youth Poetry Circle, which counted among its members other early literary pioneers of Singapore such as Goh Sin Tub and Lim Thean Soo.

== Education ==
Thumboo was educated at Victoria School (1948).

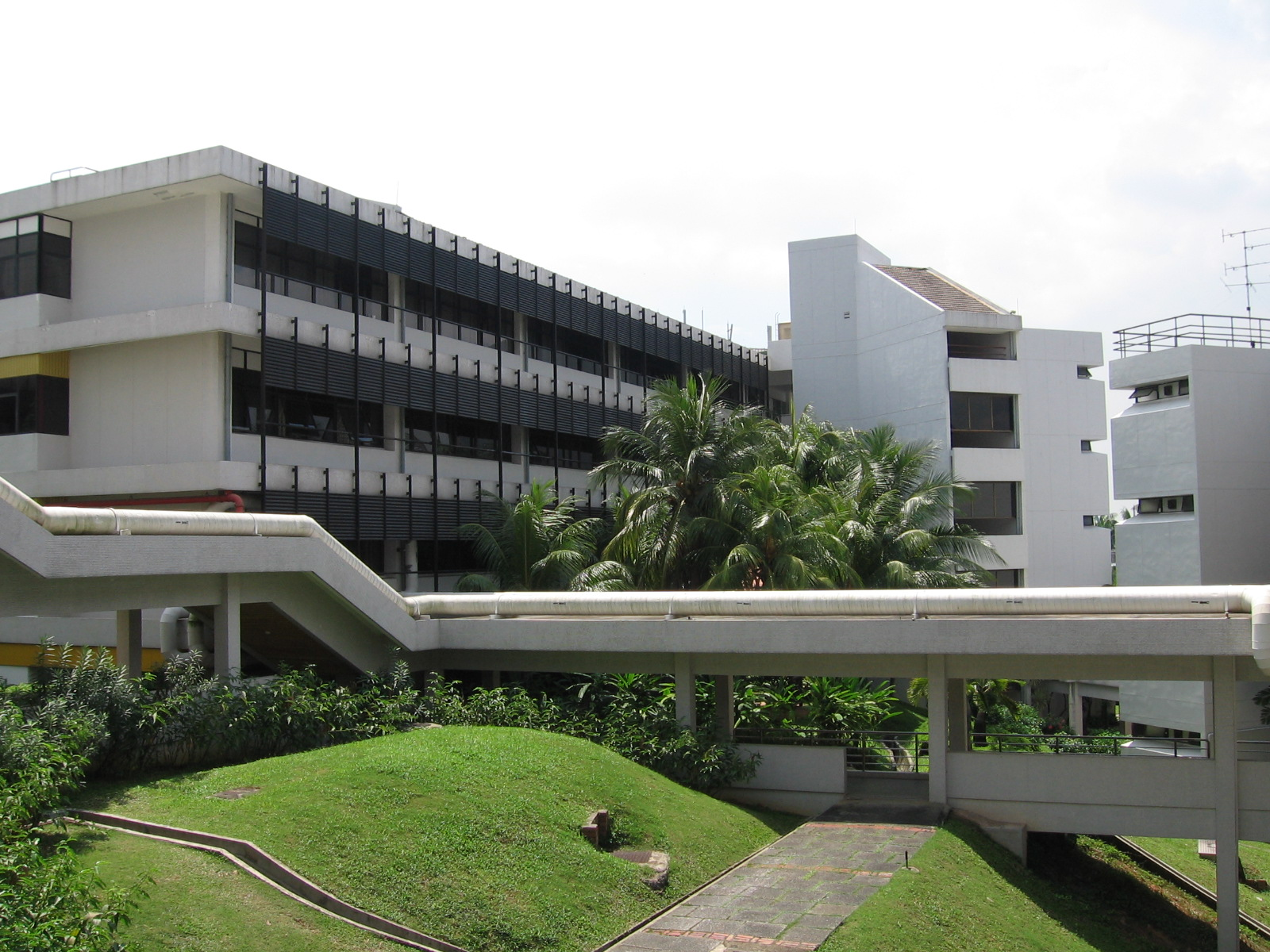
A view of the Faculty of Arts and Social Sciences, National University of Singapore (NUS) at Kent Ridge on 25 November 2006. Thumboo was Dean of the Faculty from 1980 to 1991, making him NUS's longest-serving dean.

Thumboo majored in English literature and history at the University of Malaya. As a freshman, he was a member of the editorial board of Fajar (Dawn in Malay), a radical leftist journal published by the University Socialist Club. The seventh issue of Fajar, which appeared in May 1954 contained an editorial entitled "Aggression in Asia" which advocated independence from the United Kingdom. Three days later, the Chinese middle school students clashed with the police. As a result, after two weeks, Thumboo was arrested by the British colonial government together with seven other students and put on trial for sedition. Lee Kuan Yew, who was the Club's legal adviser and a Fajar subscriber, arranged for British Queen's Counsel D. N. Pritt to act in their defence, with Lee himself as junior counsel. The students were acquitted of the charge by District Judge F. A. Chua.

Thumboo graduated with a Bachelor of Arts with honours (B.A. (Hons.)) in English from the University of Malaya in 1956.

== Career ==
Hoping to teach and pursue a further degree, Thumboo applied for a position at the university but was rejected as few locals held academic posts at that time. He therefore entered the civil service, working for the Income Tax Department (1957–1959), Central Provident Fund Board (1959–1964), and the Singapore Telephone Board (1964–1966) where he was an assistant secretary.

=== Academic career ===
In 1966, the year following Singapore's independence, he joined the University of Singapore as an assistant lecturer. Conducting doctoral research into African poetry in English, he received his Ph.D. from the university in 1970. He became a full professor in the Department of English Language and Literature, heading the department between 1977 and 1993. The University of Singapore and Nanyang University merged in 1980 to form the National University of Singapore (NUS), and he was the Dean of the Faculty of Arts and Social Sciences from 1980 to 1991, NUS's longest-serving dean of the Faculty of Arts and Social Sciences.

As an academic, he taught Elizabethan and Jacobean drama, the Romantic poets, Malaysian and Singaporean literatures, and creative writing, among other subjects. His research interests included the modern novel (E. M. Forster, D. H. Lawrence and Joseph Conrad) and the novels of Empire (such as Rudyard Kipling), Commonwealth literature (including Botswana writer Bessie Head), and William Shakespeare's Roman plays. When he headed the English Department, it introduced the study of Commonwealth/New Literatures in English, and of English language as a major so that graduates would be better equipped to teach English in schools and junior colleges. Thumboo was appointed a Professorial Fellow by NUS in 1995 and continues to be associated with the university as an emeritus professor, a position he has held since he retired from full-time teaching in September 1997. He served as the first Chairman and Director of the university's Centre for the Arts from 1993 to 2005.

Thumboo also held visiting professorships and fellowships at universities in Australia, the UK and the US. He was Fulbright-Hayes Visiting Professor at Pennsylvania State University (1979–1980); Chairman of the Association for Commonwealth Literature and Language Studies, VII Triennium (1983–1986); Writer-in-Residence at the Institute of Culture and Communication, Hawaii (1985); Ida Beam Professor at the University of Iowa in 1986; a member of the International Advisory Panel at the East-West Centre, Hawaii (1987); Honorary Research Fellow at University College, University of London (1987); a member of the Committee of Jurors for the Neustadt International Prize for Literature in Oklahoma, USA (1988); CAS–Miller Visiting Professor at the University of Illinois at Urbana-Champaign (1998), Visiting Professor and Writer-in-Residence at University of Wollongong in New South Wales (1989); and Visiting Fellow at the Department of English, Australian Defence Force Academy (1993). In 1991, Thumboo worked with the Ministry of Education to help establish the Creative Arts Programme for secondary school and junior college students in Singapore. He continues to mentor young poets under the programme.

== Poetry and influence ==
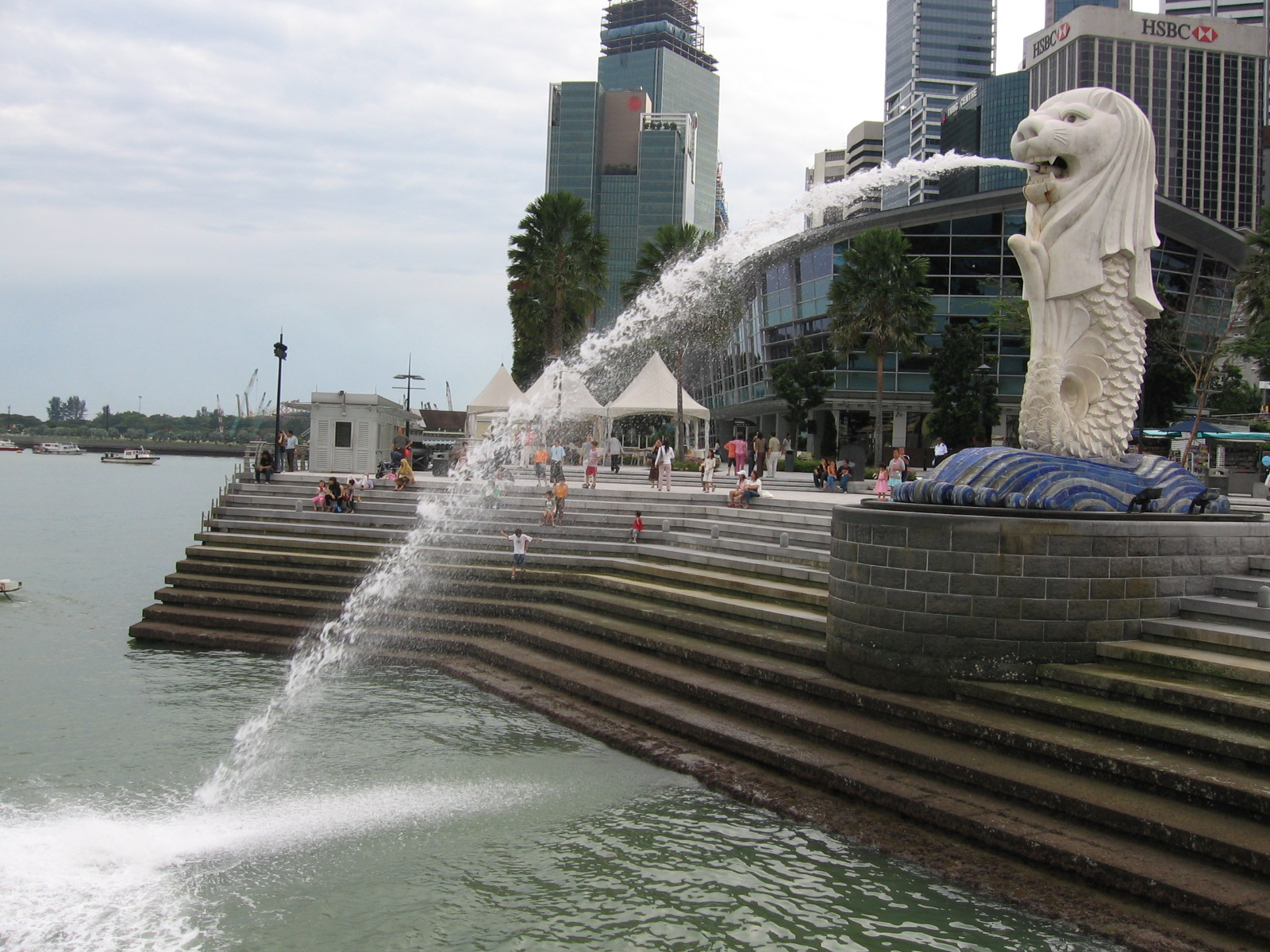

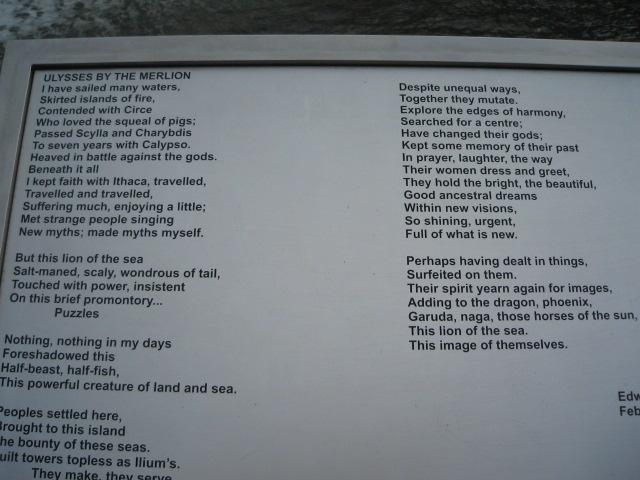
Thumboo's Ulysses by the Merlion (1979; bottom) mounted on a plaque near the Merlion statue (top) that faces Marina Bay.

Thumboo began writing poetry when he was studying in Victoria School in the 1940s.

In the 1950s, Thumboo wrote mostly lyrical poetry based on personal experiences. Displaying the influence of the English literary tradition on him, they dealt with aesthetic and metaphysical themes. By the mid-1970s, he had shifted his focus to the public sphere, believing that poets of post-independence Singapore should work towards creating a national literature. Singapore's national life was a key subject of his collection of poetry Gods Can Die (1977), and it has been said that the subsequent anthologies Ulysses by the Merlion (1979) and A Third Map (1993) "established his reputation as a national poet committed to articulating a cultural vision for a multicultural Singapore". Thumboo is often dubbed Singapore's unofficial poet laureate because of his poems with nationalistic themes, notably 9 August – II (1977), and Ulysses by the Merlion (1979) which was published in the anthology of the same name, as well as his role in promoting Singapore literature, for example, through his work as General Editor of the literary journal Singa. Ulysses, which references an iconic statue of a beast with the upper body of a lion and the tail of a fish called the Merlion that faces Marina Bay, was inspired by the use of Irish mythology and history by W. B. Yeats. The Irish poet has asserted a significant influence on Thumboo, as Thumboo recognizes parallels between Ireland's nationalistic struggle and Singapore's breakaway from colonialism. He describes himself as a myth-inspired poet, and sees myths as ancient narratives and structures which provide a stable point of reference for a multicultural society. Ulysses has prompted other Singaporean poets such as Alfian Sa'at, Vernon Chan, David Leo, Felix Cheong, Gwee Li Sui, Koh Buck Song, Lee Tzu Pheng, Alvin Pang and Daren Shiau to write their own Merlion-themed verses; it is often joked that one cannot be regarded as a true Singapore poet until one has written a "Merlion poem". A copy of Ulysses is installed on a plaque near the statue.

History also features strongly in Thumboo's poetry. He has said:

... History enters my writing, as it ought to enter the writing of others, because of its importance in our lives. I go back to this point about the historical moments we occupy. As a former colony, a multi-racial one, created by the British, we need history for a sense of things; to re-inscribe ourselves; discover and, in certain areas, define ourselves as individuals, as groups in a multi-racial society. They give you a sense of their belonging, which also happens to be mine. They give you an inherited identity that you put together by being conscious of what you have absorbed, or taken. I live in Singapore; I have likes and dislikes, a set of interests, a set of values, a set of responsibilities and so on. History I see as fully inclusive, fully in terms of one's personal limits. And it includes beliefs, and anything of significance ... nothing is irrelevant.

In August 2008, The Straits Times said that Thumboo's "most powerful legacy" was "spearheading the creation of a Singapore literature in English", although Thumboo himself downplayed his pioneering role by commenting: "There were not that many people writing in 1965, so you had the feeling that you had to create something. But you don't stand there and say, 'Look, I am a pioneer'. There is a need to do something, to help go about creating something, and you do it." He compiled and edited some of the first anthologies of English poetry from Singapore and Malaysia, including The Flowering Tree (1970), Seven Poets (1973) and The Second Tongue (1979). He was also the general editor of two multilingual anthologies sponsored by the Association of Southeast Asian Nations (ASEAN) Committee of Culture and Information entitled The Poetry of Singapore (1985) and The Fiction of Singapore (1990). In addition to the collections of poetry already mentioned, he has published two volumes of poetry for children called Child's Delight (1972), and another collection called Friend: Poems (2003). Still Travelling, an anthology consisting of almost 50 poems, was published in 2008.

On 29 October 2001, at the launch of a book entitled Ariels: Departures and Returns – Essays for Edwin Thumboo at the Singapore Art Museum, Associate Professor Robbie Goh said:

... Edwin Thumboo’s dual discourses – the analytical and theoretical discourse of the scholar, and the emotive and associative discourse of the poet – enable him to capture the flow of our experience, and to present it in a variety of different ways, accessible to a variety of individuals. ... I've come to see that Edwin Thumboo writes incessantly, because he is driven to communicate something of a better world; he rolls his sleeves up to act, because he is impatient with waiting for this world to change; and he forges friendships, because these represent the hope for a better world even within this imperfect one. His impact cannot be measured by words alone, but words – the tools of his own trade – may capture the "covenant" of his ideas and values.

In 2015, Gods Can Die was selected by The Business Times as one of the Top 10 English Singapore books from 1965–2015, alongside titles by Goh Poh Seng and Daren Shiau. Thumboo was the National Gallery Singapore's second poet-in-residence 2018-19, with the poems from this residency published in the book Ayatana (2020).

== Awards ==
Thumboo has won the National Book Development Council of Singapore Book Awards for Poetry three times, in 1978 for Gods Can Die (1977), in 1980 for Ulysses by the Merlion (1979), and again in 1994 for A Third Map (1993). He also received the inaugural S.E.A. Write Award in 1979, the first Cultural Medallion for Literature in 1979, and the ASEAN Cultural and Communication Award (Literature) in 1987. In October 2002, he presented the keynote address at the biennial meeting of the International Association of World Englishes at the University of Illinois at Urbana-Champaign. There, he was presented with the Raja Rao Award for his contributions to the literature of the Indian diaspora.

Thumboo was conferred the Bintang Bakti Masyarakat (Public Service Star) in 1981 with an additional Bar in 1991, and the Pingat Jasa Gemilang (Meritorious Services Medal) as Distinguished Poet and Literary Scholar in 2006.

== Personal life ==
Thumboo was born into a Protestant Christian family and baptized as an adult. Thumboo and his wife Yeo Swee Ching live in Bukit Panjang, a suburban area in the central northwestern part of Singapore. They have a son who was the head of research at the Singapore General Hospital; a daughter, who is a physician; and seven grandchildren.

== Select bibliography ==
=== Poetry collections ===
- Rib of Earth, Singapore: L. Fernando, 1956, OCLC 63867626.
- Child's Delight, Vol. 1, Kuala Lumpur, Malaysia: Federal Publications, 1972, OCLC 416905228 and Child's Delight, Vol. 2, Kuala Lumpur, Malaysia: Federal Publications, 1972, OCLC 416905241.
- Gods Can Die, Singapore: Heinemann Educational Books (Asia), 1977, OCLC 3729008.
- Ulysses by the Merlion, Singapore: Heinemann Educational Books, 1979, OCLC 8183888.
- A Third Map, Singapore: UniPress, 1993, ISBN 978-981-00-4403-9.
- Friend: Poems, Singapore: Landmark Books; National University of Singapore, 2003, ISBN 978-981-3065-72-7.
- Still Travelling, Singapore: Ethos Books, 2008, ISBN 978-981-08-1000-9.
- The Best of Edwin Thumboo, Singapore: Epigram Books, 2012, ISBN 978-981-07-1839-8.

=== Edited poetry anthologies ===
- Thumboo, Edwin, comp. (1970), The Flowering Tree: Selected Writings from Singapore/Malaysia, Singapore: Educational Publications Bureau, OCLC 2317731.
- Thumboo, Edwin, comp. (1973), Seven Poets, Singapore and Malaysia, Singapore: Singapore University Press, OCLC 1615607.
- Thumboo, Edwin, comp. (1979), The Second Tongue: An Anthology of Poetry from Malaysia and Singapore, Singapore: Heinemann Educational Books (Asia), OCLC 558156724.
- Thumboo, Edwin; et al., eds. (1985), The Poetry of Singapore [Anthology of ASEAN Literatures; v. 1], Singapore: Published under the sponsorship of the ASEAN Committee on Culture and Information, ISBN 978-9971-88-089-7.
- Thumboo, Edwin, ed. (1990), The Fiction of Singapore, [S.l.]: Published under the sponsorship of the ASEAN Committee on Culture and Information. ISBN 978-9971882488 (v. 2), ISBN 978-9971-88-249-5 (v. 2a), ISBN 978-9971-88-250-1 (v. 3).
- Thumboo, Edwin; et al., eds. (1995), Journeys: Words, Home and Nation: Anthology of Singapore Poetry (1984–1995), Singapore: UniPress, ISBN 978-981-00-6910-0.
- Thumboo, Edwin, comp. (2009), 35 for Gothenburg, Singapore: Ethos Books, ISBN 978-981-08-4018-1.
- Thumboo, Edwin, comp. (2010), &Words: Poems Singapore and Beyond, Singapore: Ethos Books, ISBN 978-981-08-6321-0.

=== Other works ===
- Thumboo, Edwin, ed. (1988), Literature and Liberation: Five Essays from Southeast Asia, Manila, Philippines: Solidaridad Pub. House, OCLC 19124535.
- Thumboo, Edwin; et al., eds. (1990), Words for the 25th: Readings by Singapore Writers, Singapore: UniPress, ISBN 978-9971-62-259-6.
- Thumboo, Edwin, ed. (1991), Perceiving Other Worlds, Singapore: Times Academic Press [for] Unipress, ISBN 978-981-2100-10-8.
- Thumboo, Edwin (1993), "Singapore Writing in English: A Need for Commitment", in Bruce Bennett; et al. (eds.), Westerly Looks to Asia: A Selection from Westerly 1956–1992, Nedlands, W.A.: Indian Ocean Centre for Peace Studies, University of Western Australia, pp. 84–92, ISBN 978-1-86342-193-5.
- Thumboo, Edwin; Kandiah, Thiru, eds. (1995), The Writer as Historical Witness: Studies in Commonwealth Literature, Singapore: UniPress, ISBN 978-981-0044-54-1.
- Thumboo, Edwin, ed. (1996), Cultures in ASEAN and the 21st Century, Singapore: UniPress for ASEAN-COCI, ISBN 978-981-00-8174-4.
- Thumboo, Edwin, ed. (2001), The Three Circles of English: Language Specialists Talk about the English Language, Singapore: UniPress, ISBN 978-981-04-2563-0.
- Thumboo, Edwin, ed. (2005), Frankie Sionil José: A Tribute, Singapore: Marshall Cavendish, ISBN 978-981-210-425-0.
- Thumboo, Edwin (2006), "Literary Creativity in World Englishes", in Braj B. Kachru; Yamuna Kachru; Cecil L. Nelson (eds.), The Handbook of World Englishes, Malden, Mass.: Blackwell Publishing, pp. 405–427, ISBN 978-1-4051-1185-0.
- Thumboo, Edwin; Sayson, Rex Ian, eds. (2007), Writing Asia: The Literatures in Englishes. Vol. 1, From the Inside: Asia Pacific Literatures in Englishes, Singapore: Ethos Books, ISBN 978-981-05-9314-8.
- Quayum, Mohammad A.; Wong, Phui Nam (2009), Thumboo, Edwin (ed.), Writing Asia: The Literatures in Englishes. Vol. 2, Studies in Contemporary Singaporean-Malaysian Literature I, Singapore: Ethos Books, ISBN 978-981-08-3911-6.
- Gwee, Li Sui (2009), Thumboo, Edwin (ed.), Writing Asia: The Literatures in Englishes. Vol. 2, Studies in Contemporary Singaporean-Malaysian Literature II, Singapore: Ethos Books, ISBN 978-981-08-3913-0.
