= Daren Shiau =

Singaporean poet and novelist (born 1971)

Daren Shiau BBM PBM
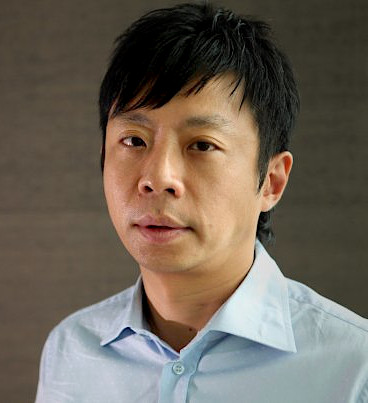
- Shiau in 2008
- Born: June 1971 (age 55)
- Writing career
- Notable awards: Public Service Star (2022), Public Service Medal (2016), Japanese Chamber of Commerce and Industry (JCCI) Foundation Education Award (2003), National Arts Council Young Artist Award (2002), Commonwealth Youth Program Asia Award for Excellence in Youth Work (2001), Singapore Youth Award (Community Service) (2000)
- Website: darenshiau.com

Daren Shiau Vee Lung (Note: Chinese: 萧维龙; Pha̍k-fa-sṳ: Siâu Vì-lùng; Pinyin: Xiāo Wéilóng) BBM PBM (born June 1971) is a Singaporean novelist, poet, conservationist, and lawyer in private practice qualified in Singapore, England and Wales. He is an author of five books.

== Education ==
Shiau was born in Singapore in 1971, and is a Hakka and Peranakan descent. He was educated at Raffles Institution, Raffles Junior College, and graduated from the Law Faculty of the National University of Singapore on the Dean's List in 1996.

A Fulbright scholar, and an alumnus of the East-West Center in Honolulu established by the United States Congress in 1960, Shiau was the Visiting Writer in Fall 2003 to the University of California, Berkeley.

== Literary career ==
Shiau is the author of Heartland (1999), Peninsular: Archipelagos and Other Islands (2000), and Velouria (2007). He is also a co-editor of Coast (2010), a seminal mono-titular anthology.

Travel guide Lonely Planet: Malaysia, Singapore and Brunei has cited Shiau as the author of the "definitive Singapore novel", and The Arts Magazine had described Shiau as "among the most exciting of the post-1965 generation of writers". He is regarded as one of the ‘Class of 95’, the pre-digital literary wave of Singapore writers which includes Boey Kim Cheng, Heng Siok Tian, Yong Shu Hoong and Alvin Pang.

=== Heartland (1999) ===
Shiau's first work, Heartland is an existential novel. It deals with the paradox of rootedness and rootlessness of Singaporeans born after the Japanese Occupation. The book received the Singapore Literature Prize Commendation Award in 1998, together with Alfian Sa'at's Corridor. Heartland was named by Singapore's English daily The Straits Times in December 1999, along with J. M. Coetzee's Disgrace, as one of the 10 Best Books of the Year. In 2007, an academic edition of Heartland was adopted into a textbook for Singapore secondary schools offering English literature in their GCE O-Level curriculum.

In 2015, Heartland was selected by The Business Times as one of the Top 10 English Singapore books from 1965 to 2015, alongside titles by Arthur Yap, Goh Poh Seng and Philip Jeyaretnam. In the same year, Mediacorp commissioned the adaptation of Heartland into a telemovie directed by K Rajagopal. Heartland, the telemovie, was broadcast in August 2015.

=== Peninsular: Archipelagos and Other Islands (2000) ===
A year after Heartland was published, Shiau released a poetry collection, Peninsular: Archipelagos and Other Islands. Poems from Peninsular have been included in several international and Singapore anthologies.

Emeritus Professor Edwin Thumboo wrote an essay about Peninsular titled 'Time and Place: History and Geography in Daren Shiau's Poetry' in which he commented: "The incisive revelations of Shiau's work begin with the significance and the reach of his themes. Interrelated and overlapping, they explain both the intrinsic unity of his work and – for me at least – its importance in the present overall balance of Singapore literature in English".

The Singapore literature platform, poetry.sg, observes in its ‘Critical Introduction’ to Shiau: “Shiau’s first collection of poetry, Peninsular, encapsulates through its structure and its themes the dual concerns of history and spatiality in his writing, which began early on in Heartland (both the original collection of poetry and the final publication conceived as a novel), and which persists in later work such as Velouria.

=== Velouria (2007) and microfiction ===
Velouria is a seminal collection of Singaporean microfiction, published by Shiau in 2007. In the same year, Shiau received the top prize in The Straits Times’ inaugural microfiction competition with his story ‘Sedimentary’. ‘Sedimentary’ was included in the 2017 reprint of Velouria.

The title story of the book is named after a track by Boston-based alternative rock band, the Pixies. Other stories in the volume were named after songs by artistes such as My Bloody Valentine and Thelonious Monk.

In 2005, Shiau was first runner-up in the Golden Point Award creative writing competition for his short story, Take Your Wings Off, I Say. Undeterred, he further truncated the story into a piece of microfiction which then anchored Velouria.

An editorial on Shiau's writing on poetry.sg notes that his “wry observational poetry is transposed into [his] later collection of microfiction, Velouria, which also maintains the elegiac quality of poetry, while combining the compression and suggestiveness of poetic language with the broader narrative and character developments afforded by prose”.

Poet Cyril Wong comments of Velouria that its “prose shards… seep into the heart like novels condensed into short films or poetry”.

=== Coast (2010) and editorial work ===
On the editorial front, Shiau co-edited with Lee Wei Fen in 2010, an experimental anthology, Coast: A Mono-titular Anthology of Singapore Writing, which featured over 50 creative works by both published and unpublished writers across a single title. Writers included Goh Poh Seng, Lee Tzu Pheng, Eric Khoo, Toh Hsien Min, Cyril Wong, Alfian Sa’at and Pooja Nansi.

Literary critic, Dr Gwee Li Sui, has described Coast as "nothing short of a manifesto, a call to stretch out the tent poles of language and go in search of an idiom for making destiny".

=== Other literary involvements ===
Shiau has been invited to read in New York, Boston and London. He has been a guest writer at the Melbourne Writers Festival, and the Hong Kong International Literary Festival.

His works have also been translated into several languages, namely Italian, German, Chinese, Malay, Tamil, and have been featured in cross-discipline public performances by other artists. In 2015, Shiau collaborated with indie band Riot in Magenta to present a performance at the Esplanade Recital Studio as part of the Singapore Writers Festival.

Shiau has served as a writing mentor for the Creative Arts Programme administered by the Ministry of Education, and the National Arts Council's Mentor Access Project.

In 2021, Shiau was appointed co-chair of the Singapore Writers Festival's advisory panel.

== Conservation ==
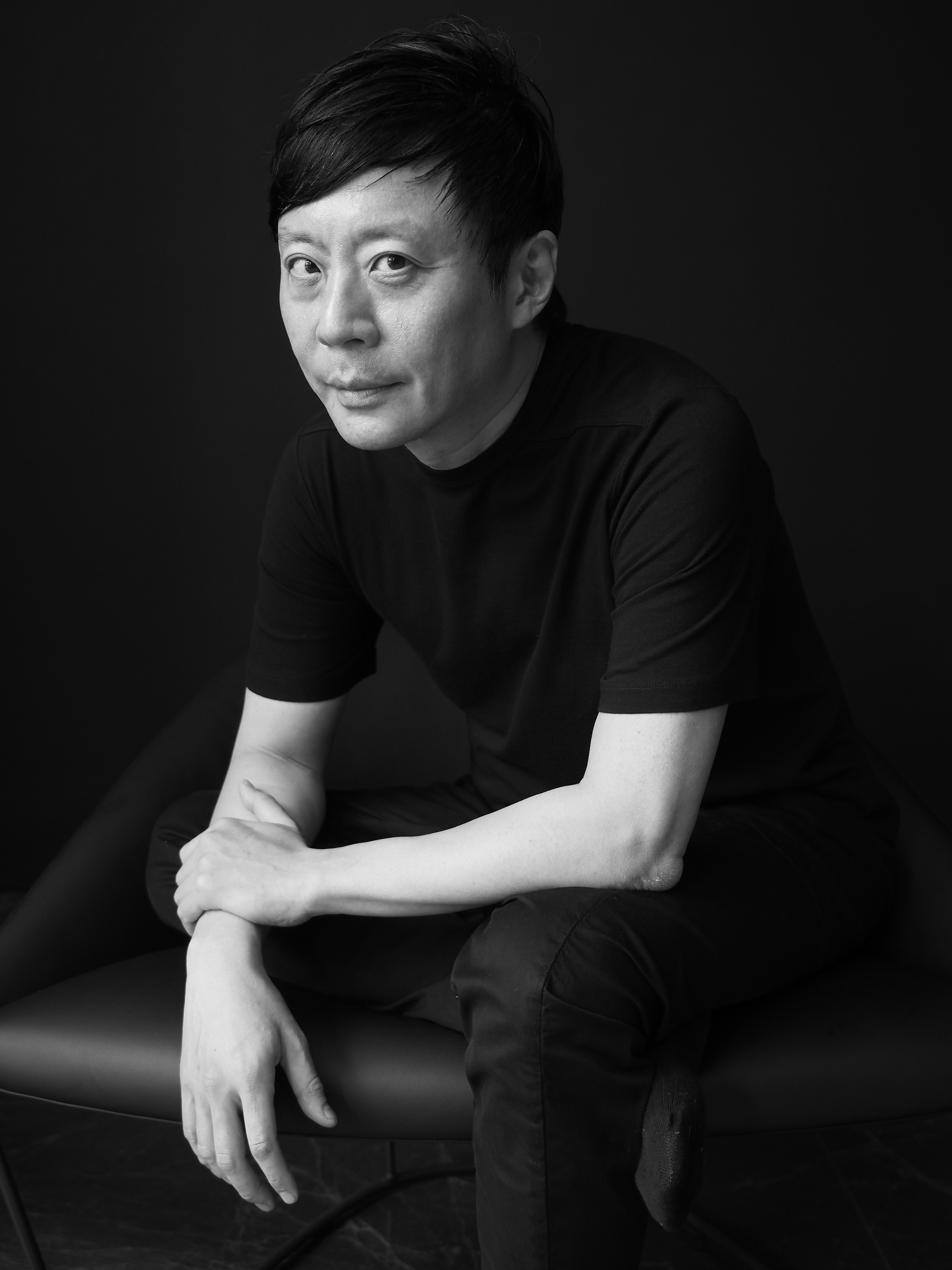
Shiau in 2021

At the National University of Singapore, Shiau was one of the first chairmen of the pioneering sustainability and environmental activism NGO, Students Against Violation of the Earth (SAVE). SAVE was involved in climate change advocacy, as well as biodiversity protection and reforestation efforts in Singapore in the Nineties.

In 1993, Shiau, then a sophomore undergraduate, in activating the university's campus-wide recycling programme, led SAVE in organising Water for Somalia, a project to raise funds for building water pipelines for Kenyan and Ethiopian refugees. It was the largest national recycling effort at that time, and received recognition and praise by the United Nations High Commissioner for Refugees in Geneva.

A year before his graduation, Shiau was elected the inaugural national chairman of the Youth Environmental Network of Singapore (YEN), an umbrella organisation for school-based sustainability and environmental NGOs.

Shiau was subsequently appointed as director on the independently managed Singapore Environment Council, and as board member of the National Parks Board, a statutory board of Singapore's Ministry of National Development. He has also been named an international expert of the Commission on Environmental Law of the International Union for Conservation of Nature in Switzerland, during which he published a monograph titled Communication and the Environment.

For his outstanding contributions to preservation of the local environment, Shiau has been awarded the inaugural Green Leaf Award, the predecessor to the President's Award for the Environment.

In 2016, Shiau was further appointed to the Management Committee of the Garden City Fund, an Institute of Public Character in Singapore originally established by patron Lee Kuan Yew, which complements the National Parks Board's greening and biodiversity conservation efforts.

In 2020, he was appointed as Treasurer of the Fund which oversees more than S$20 million in assets. During Shiau's tenure, the National Parks Board has undertaken climate resilience initiatives such as mangrove restoration along the northern coastline of Pulau Ubin, and wildlife habitat enhancement in areas as such as Clementi Forest and the Southern Ridges.

== Accolades ==
Shiau is a recipient of:

- the Commonwealth Youth Program Asia Award for Excellence in Youth Work, 2001 administered by the Commonwealth Secretariat
- the Singapore Youth Award 2000 (Community Service), conferred by then Prime Minister Goh Chok Tong
- the Outstanding Young Person of Singapore Award 2000, administered by the Ladies Chapter of the Junior Chamber International
- the Young Artist Award (Literature) in 2002 from the National Arts Council

In 1993, he was selected by The Straits Times on Singapore's National Day as one of "50 Faces to Watch". A decade later in 2003, he was again named by The Straits Times on National Day as one of "38 Singaporeans Who Make a Difference to Singapore".

The Japanese community in Singapore recognised Shiau's contributions to civic education by conferring on him the Japanese Chamber of Commerce and Industry (JCCI) Foundation Education Award in 2003.

In 2016, Shiau was conferred the civilian order, the Public Service Medal (Pingat Bakti Masyarakat) by the President of the Republic of Singapore. In 2022, Shiau was further conferred the civilian order, the Public Service Star (Bintang Bakti Masyarakat) by the President of the Republic of Singapore.

== Public service ==
Shiau has volunteered actively in the community, particularly in the Central Singapore District. Over the years, he has been appointed by the Singapore Government and the private sector to sit on various national-level committees relating to the arts, education and conservation. This includes working and focus groups of the Committee on the Future Economy (2016), the Urban Redevelopment Authority's Concept Plan Review Committee (both in 2011 and 2001), and the Singapore 21 Committee (1997).

Other appointments have included the Films Appeal Committee of the Media Development Authority of Singapore, and the Supervisory Panel of the Government's Feedback Unit. Shiau has also previously served as a Council Member on the National Youth Council.

Shiau is a member of the founding Board of Directors for Crest Secondary School, the first Specialised School for Normal (Technical) students in Singapore, which was announced by Prime Minister Lee Hsien Loong during his National Day Rally speech in 2010.

== Selected bibliography ==
=== Fiction ===
- Heartland (Raffles, 1999, ISBN 9789814032438 | Ethos Books, 2002/2006/2021, ISBN 9789810456054 / ISBN 9789810560584 / ISBN 9789811811203).
- Shiau, Daren (2007). Velouria. Kwang Cheng Ng. Singapore: Firstfruits. ISBN 9789810593865. OCLC 187241307.

=== Poetry ===
- Shiau, Daren (2000). Peninsular : archipelagos and other islands. Singapore: Ethos Books. ISBN 9789810424152. OCLC 45178475.

=== Anthologies ===
==== As editor ====
- Shiau, Daren; Lee, Wei Fen, eds. (2011). Coast. Singapore: Math Paper Press. ISBN 9789810899387. OCLC 768466525.

==== As contributor ====
- Writing Singapore: An Historical Anthology of Singapore Literature, co-edited by Angelia Poon, Philip Holden and Shirley Geok-Lin Lim (NUS Press, 2000, ISBN 9789971694869).
- Rhythms: A Singapore Millenial Anthology of Poetry (National Arts Council, 2000, ISBN 9789971887636).
- An Anthology of Malaysian & Singaporean Poems: From the Window of this Epoch / Anthologi Puisi Malaysia & Singapura: Dari Jendela Zaman Ini (National Arts Council, Institut Terjemahan Negara Malaysia Berhad, 2010, ISBN 9789830684802).
- Sedici Racconti dall'Asia Estrema, edited by Massimo Coppola and translated by Anna Mioni (Isbn Edizioni, 2005, ISBN 9788876380105).
- Die Horen: Zeitschrift für Lteratur, Kunst und Kritik, edited and translated by Klaus Stadtmüller (Wallstein Verlag, 2011, ISBN 9783869181134).

=== Monographs ===
- Shiau, Daren (1999). Communication and the environment : a handbook for the Singapore Environment Council's Green Volunteers Network. Singapore Environment Council. Singapore: Singapore Environment Council. ISBN 9789810420086. OCLC 226182462.

== See also ==
- Literature of Singapore
