= Goh Poh Seng =

Singaporean writer (1936–2010)

- 吴宝星
- Born: July 1936; Kuala Lumpur, British Malaya
- Died: 10 January 2010 (aged 73); Vancouver, British Columbia, Canada
- Education: University College Dublin
- Awards: 1982 Cultural Medallion

Goh Poh Seng (Chinese: 吴宝星; Chinese: 吳寶星; pinyin: Wú Bǎo Xīng; July 1936 – 10 January 2010) was a Singaporean dramatist, novelist, doctor and poet, was born in Kuala Lumpur, British Malaya in 1936. He was educated at Victoria Institution in Kuala Lumpur, received his medical degree from University College Dublin, and practised medicine in Singapore for twenty-five years.

== Writing career ==
Goh's writing blossomed in Ireland, where he met writers Patrick Kavanagh and Brendan Behan, published his poetry in the university magazine, and took a year off school to write. Returning to Singapore, he was a founder of the literary magazine Tumasek (which lasted for three issues) and co-founded Singapore's first multi-disciplinary arts centre, Centre 65, with Lim Kok Ann in 1965 to promote the arts. Centre 65 inspired the name of Centre 42, an institution for playwriting which opened in 2014.

In 1972, Goh published his first novel, If We Dream Too Long. The novel won the Fiction Award of the National Book Development Council of Singapore (NBDCS) in 1976 and has been translated into Russian, Japanese and Tagalog. While the novel was criticised by The Straits Times upon publication, it enjoyed a first print run of 3,000 copies and was considered the first English-language Singaporean novel. It was subsequently has been used as a Literature text in various universities.

His other books include the novels The Immolation (1977) and A Dance of Moths (1995), which received the NBDCS Fiction award in 1996, and poetry collections Eyewitness (1976), Lines from Batu Ferringhi (1978) and Bird With One Wing (1982). Goh's play When the Smiles are Done (1972) was the first to use Singlish on stage, while his debut play The Moon is Less Bright (1964) was revived by Theatreworks (dir. Ong Keng Sen) in 1990 and The Second Breakfast Company (dir. Adeeb Fazah) in 2018.

In 1982, Goh received the Cultural Medallion for his contributions to Literature.

In 2007, Goh was the keynote speaker of the Singapore Writers Festival. A 15-minute documentary about Goh, directed by Almerinda Travasoss, was released in the same year.

In 2009, Goh announced his plan to write a quartet of novels loosely based on his personal and family history. Four years after his passing in 2010, the Centre for Southeast Asia Research at the University of British Columbia acquired the Goh Poh Seng Collection, a set of 110 volumes from Goh's library.

In 2015, a collection of Goh's short stories based on his adventures in 1950s Ireland, Tall Tales and MisAdventures of a Young Westernized Oriental Gentleman, was posthumously published by NUS Press. The memoir, written in the last years of Goh's life, includes reflections of his formative encounters with Irish literary giants Patrick Kavanagh and Samuel Beckett. Reviewing the book in Quarterly Literary Review Singapore, Zhang Ruihe called it "a valuable addition to Singapore literature, a record of a writer's coming of age in a time of global transition and revolution."

Goh was feted as a literary pioneer and "one of the original architects of the arts and culture scene of Singapore" at the 2023 Singapore Writers Festival.

== Other career ==
In his time living in Singapore, Goh held many honorary positions including the Chairman of the National Theatre Trust Board between 1967 and 1972, and vice-chairman of the Arts Council from 1967 to 1973. He was committed to the development of art and cultural policies of post-independent Singapore, as well as the development of cultural institutions such as the Singapore National Symphony, the Chinese Orchestra and the Singapore Dance Company.

In 1983, Goh opened Singapore's first theatre disco lounge and live music venue, Rainbow Lounge, at Ming Arcade. He also opened Bistro Toulouse-Lautrec at Tanglin Shopping Centre for live jazz and poetry readings, organised Singapore's first David Bowie concert in 1983, and envisioned a livelier Singapore River in the 1970s, a proposal that was only taken seriously decades later.

== Personal life ==
As a result of the authorities' closure of his music venue, Rainbow Lounge, after a complaint was made against it for an indecent remark by a member of the house band, Goh emigrated to Canada in 1986. In 2007, Goh returned to Singapore to attend the Singapore Writers Festival.

Goh died on 10 January 2010 in Vancouver, after suffering from Parkinson's disease in his later years. Paying tribute to Goh, playwright Robert Yeo said, "He is someone who not only believed in literature, but also believed in lifting the cultural aspirations of Singaporeans."

In 2012, his son, Kagan Goh, published Who Let In The Sky?, a family memoir about Goh's struggle with Parkinson's.

== Bibliography ==
=== Poetry ===
- Eyewitness (Heinemann Educational Books (Asia) Ltd, 1976)
- Lines from Batu Ferringhi (Island Press, 1978)
- Bird With One Wing (Island Press, 1982) ISBN 9971835061
- The Girl from Ermita & Selected Poems (Nightwood Editions, 1998) ISBN 0889711674
- As Though the Gods Love Us (Nightwood Editions, 2000) ISBN 0889711712

=== Novels ===
- If We Dream Too Long (Island Press, 1972; Heinemann Asia Ltd, 1994; NUS Press, 2010) ISBN 997169445X
- The Immolation (Heinemann Educational Books (Asia) Ltd., 1977; Epigram Books, 2011) ISBN 9810899351
- A Dance of Moths (Select Books, 1995) ISBN 9810068662
- Dance With White Clouds: A Fable for Grown Ups (Asia 2000, 2001) ISBN 9628783033

=== Plays ===
- The Moon Is Less Bright (Singapore, 1964, 1990, 2018)
- When Smiles Are Done (Singapore, 1966; retitled Room With Paper Flowers Kuala Lumpur, Malaysia, 1969)
- The Elder Brother (Singapore, 1967)

=== Short stories ===
- Tall Tales and MisAdventures of a Young Westernized Oriental Gentleman (NUS Press, 2015) ISBN 9789971696344

=== Autobiographical Essays ===
- "A Star-Lovely Art", in Vol 10 No. 1 2010 issue of Moving Worlds: A Journal of Transcultural Writing, University of Leeds

== Awards ==
- National Book Development Council Of Singapore Fiction Award, 1976
- National Book Development Council Of Singapore Fiction Award, 1996
- Cultural Medallion for Literature, 1982
