= Robert Yeo =

Singaporean poet

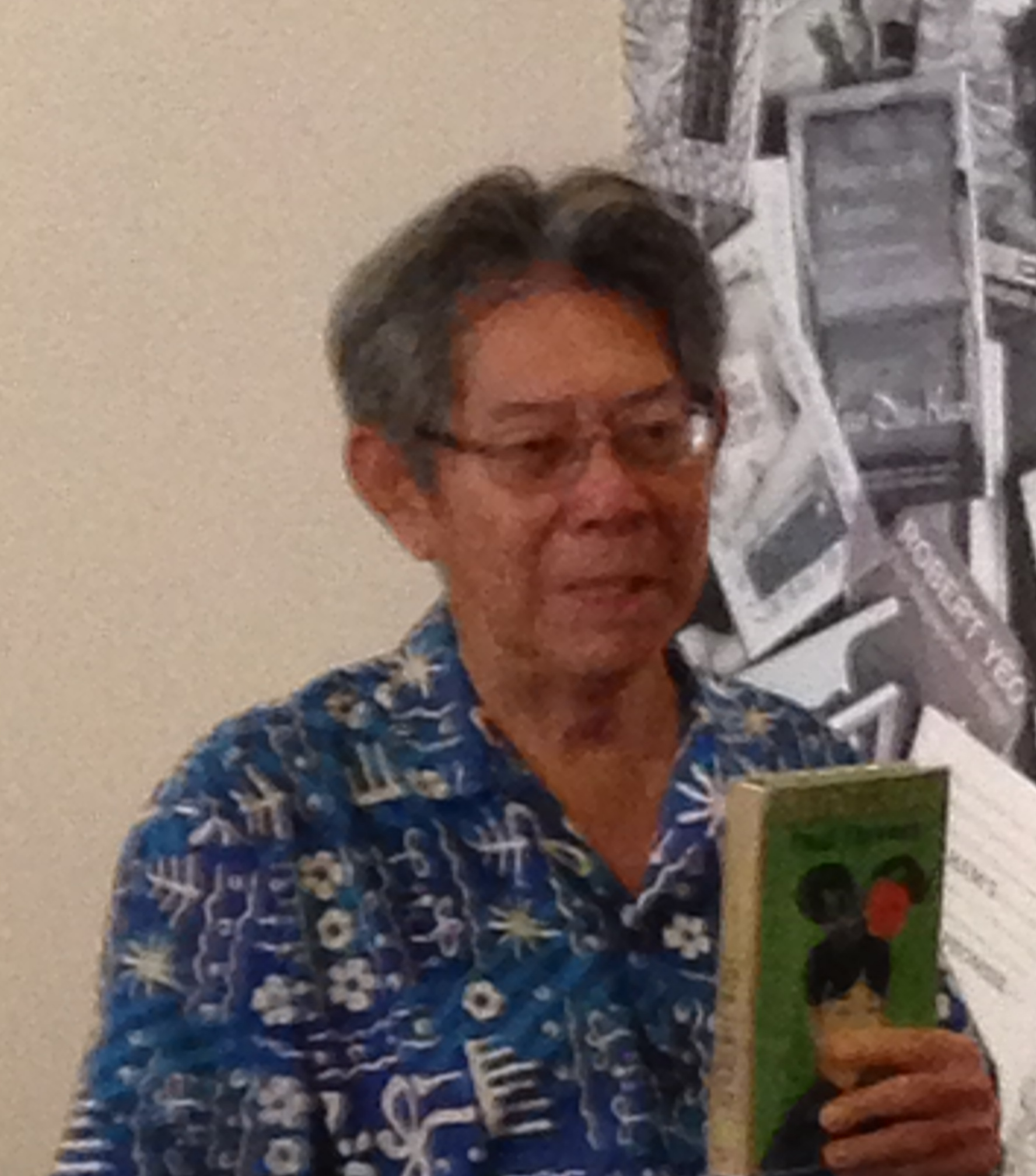
- Yeo giving a talk in January 2014
- Born: Robert Yeo Cheng Chuan; 1940 (age 85–86)
- Occupations: Poet, playwright and novelist
- Spouse: Esther Leong
- Writing career
- Language: English
- Notable works: The Adventures of Holden Heng (1986); Are You There, Singapore? (1974); One Year Back Home (1980); Changi (1996)
- Notable awards: BBM (1991), S.E.A. Write Award (2011)

Robert Yeo (born Robert Yeo Cheng Chuan; 1940) is a Singaporean poet, playwright and novelist.

== Career ==
Yeo is a retired lecturer of the National Institute of Education and Nanyang Technological University. In 2011, he is a teacher of creative writing at the Singapore Management University and mentors the Mentor Access Programme of the National Arts Council. In 1978, he attended the University of Iowa's International Writing Program and was a Fulbright Scholar in 1995. For more than a decade, from 1977 onwards, he was chairman of the Drama Advisory Committee which helped develop theatre in Singapore, especially English-language theatre. For this work, he received the Bintang Bakti Masyarakat (Public Service Star) in 1991, and was awarded the S.E.A. Write Award in 2011.

He has published four poetry collections: Coming Home Baby (1971); And Napalm Does Not Help (1977), A Part of Three (1989) and Leaving Home, Mother (1999) and has been included in several anthologies, including Five Takes (1974).

His venture into novel writing resulted in a sole book: The Adventures of Holden Heng (1986) about the sexual education of its anti-hero.

Yeo has written six plays: Are You There, Singapore? (1974), One Year Back Home (1980), Second Chance (1988), The Eye of History (1991), Changi (1996) and Your Bed is Your Coffin. All the plays except the last have been staged in Singapore. Are You There, Singapore?, One Year Back Home and Changi are collectively known as "the Singapore trilogy". The Singapore Trilogy was staged as a single adaptation by The Second Breakfast Company in 2021. The work included revisions and new writing done in consultation with Yeo.

Yeo has also edited collections of short fiction, plays and textbooks, a memoir, as well as the libretto for an opera, Fences (2012).

== Works ==
=== Poetry collections ===
- Coming Home Baby (1971, Federal Publications)
- And Napalm Does Not Help (1977, Heinemann Educational Books (Asia))
- A Part of Three (1989, Select Books) ISBN 9810010788
- Leaving Home, Mother (1999, Angsana Books) ISBN 9813056312
- The Best of Robert Yeo (2012, Epigram Books) ISBN 9789810718404

=== Novels ===
- The Adventures of Holden Heng (1986, Heinemann Publishers Asia; 2011, Epigram Books) ISBN 9971640899 ISBN 9789810899349

=== Plays ===
- Are You There, Singapore? (1974, National University of Singapore Society)
- One Year Back Home (1980, National University of Singapore Society)
- Second Chance (1988, 1992, TheatreWorks)
- The Eye of History (1992)
- Your Bed is Your Coffin (Unstaged)
- Changi (1997, National University of Singapore Society)
- The Singapore Trilogy (2001, Landmark Books) ISBN 9813065508

=== Libretto ===
- Kannagi–The Ankle Bracelet (2009, 2014)
- Fences (2012)

=== Non-fiction ===
- Routes: A Singaporean Memoir, 1940-75 (2011, Ethos Books) ISBN 9789810875367

=== Anthologies ===
- Gwee Li Sui, ed. Written Country: The History of Singapore through Literature (2016, Landmark Publications) ISBN 9789814189668

== Personal life ==
Yeo is married to Esther Leong, who he met on the set of Are You There, Singapore? in 1974, when she played the character Hua after responding to an audition call in the newspapers.
