= Maggie Black =

- Born: March 31, 1930; Central Falls, Rhode Island
- Died: May 11, 2015 (aged 85); East Hampton, New York
- Occupation: Ballet instructor

Margaret Black (March 31, 1930 – May 11, 2015) was a ballet teacher who taught in New York City during the 1970s and 1980s. She coached dancers such as Martine Van Hamel, Kevin McKenzie, Natalia Makarova, Gelsey Kirkland, Robert Hill, Amanda Mckerrow, and John Gardner She developed a ballet technique based on anatomy. She stressed moving from a neutral spinal and pelvic alignment with weight evenly distributed throughout each foot. She amassed a large following of both ballet and modern dancers. Eventually, she split her class into two, one for modern dancers and one for ballet dancers. Choreographers such as William Forsythe and Ohad Naharin attended her class.

Black was born in Rhode Island in 1930, and moved to New York City at the age of 16 to study dance. She danced with Cleveland Civic Ballet for a season and then moved to London where she danced with the London Theatre Ballet and Ballet Rambert. In London she studied with Audry de Vos. After two years in the UK, she returned to New York and danced with American Ballet Theatre for a year. At the invitation of Alicia Alonso, she danced with National Ballet of Cuba for a year before returning to New York City to join the Metropolitan Opera Ballet. There she worked with Antony Tudor who later invited her to teach at Juilliard.

After working with Tudor for 7 years, Black returned to London. She spent three years reworking her own technique. She spent multiple hours a day in front of a mirror developing her theory of physical alignment that became the foundation for her teaching. To Black alignment is central to ballet technique and artistry. Moving from a natural alignment allows for freedom from tension and clarity of line and movement quality.

Black retired in 1995. On May 11, 2015, Black died in her East Hampton, New York home from, according to Black's friend Gary Chryst, congestive heart failure.

In October 2016, seventeen dancers remembered legendary teacher Maggie Black in Ballet Review Fall edition -- " Maggie Black ( 1930- 2015)" by Joseph Carmine
