= Goh Choo San =

Chinese ballet dancer and choreographer (1948–1987)

- Born: 14 September 1948; Singapore City, Colony of Singapore
- Died: 28 November 1987 (aged 39); Manhattan, New York, U.S.
- Education: Raffles Institution; National University of Singapore
- Occupations: ballet dancer and choreographer
- Years active: 1970–1987

Goh Choo San (Chinese: 吴诸珊; Pe̍h-ōe-jī: Ngôo Tsu-suan; 14 September 1948 – 28 November 1987) was a Singaporean ballet dancer and choreographer whose decade-long association with The Washington Ballet brought that company international acclaim.

== Childhood ==
The son of Goh Kim Lok (1904–1970), a merchant, and Siew Han Ch'ng (1912–1989), Goh was the youngest of nine children. His Chinese parents spoke Mandarin and brought up their children with very traditional values. Goh was influenced by and followed in the path of three of his older siblings to train as a dancer. Performance tours to Singapore from overseas ballet companies stimulated their interest in dance.

His elder sister Goh Soo Nee 吴素妮 trained at the Royal Ballet School in London and returned to Singapore to co-found the Singapore Ballet Academy. His elder brother Goh Choo Chiat 吴诸杰 also trained at the Royal Ballet, later became a principal dancer in the Beijing Ballet, and is the artistic director of the Goh Ballet Academy in Vancouver, British Columbia. Another sister, Goh Soo Khim 吴素琴, trained at the Australian Ballet and co-founded Singapore Dance Theatre in 1988.

== Education ==
Goh studied at the Nanyang Primary School and proceeded to Raffles Institution. Goh's earliest desire was to become an airline pilot, but his studies in ballet, taught by his sister, Soonee Goh, led him towards his eventual career path as a dancer. At his father's insistence, he first completed his University education and graduated with a degree in Bio-chemistry from the University of Singapore.

== Early career ==
In 1970 Goh travelled to Europe in hope of finding a position in a ballet company and was offered a place with the Dutch National Ballet in Amsterdam after first dancing in Lausanne, Switzerland and with the Scarpino Ballet in Amsterdam. The company had a rich blend of classical and contemporary choreography. Goh joined as a member of the corps de ballet and was eventually elevated to soloist with the company during his five years with the company. He excelled in works by the company's resident choreographers, Toer van Schayk and Rudi van Dantzig, as well as in works by Balanchine and Petipa.

While still a dancer with the company, Goh created his first ballets in a workshop environment. These small ballets brought him to the attention of Mary Day, director of the Washington School of Ballet in Washington, DC. Believing in his talent, she offered him a position with her newly founded Washington Ballet in 1976. Goh saw this as a chance to grow along with the pace of the development of the new company and took on the responsibilities of company teacher and resident choreographer at their inception as a professional company.

Over the course of the next few years his work became increasingly sophisticated and definitive works like Fives (1978), using Ernest Bloch's Concerto Grosso began to emerge. Goh came to the notice of several important artistic directors of dance companies, including the Pacific Northwest Ballet and the Dance Theater of Harlem as word of mouth spread that his talent was producing works of a very high quality. Many noted that his work was filled with a usage of classical ballet vocabulary that seemed influenced by his Asian heritage. His vision was more "symphonic" in that he utilized numerous soloist dancers in a ballet rather than the traditional principal dancer/corps de ballet arrangement typical in classical choreography.

For the Houston Ballet he created two new works (1979 & 1980) and for the Alvin Ailey American Dance Theater he created Spectrum (1981). American Ballet Theatre commissioned Configurations to be created for Mikhail Baryshnikov soon after. His only full-length work, Romeo and Juliet, to Prokofiev's famous score, was created for the Boston Ballet in 1984.

Goh maintained his work with The Washington Ballet as a primary commitment, creating one or two new works each year in addition to re-staging for them some of the successful ballets he was now creating for other companies. He was given the position of associate director of the company in addition to retaining his title as resident choreographer in 1984. The city of Washington presented him with the Mayor's Award for Excellence in the Arts in 1986. The Washington Ballet gained international notice due to Goh's work with the dancers in the company. Alan M. Kriegsman, Dance critic for The Washington Post, wrote that Goh "has propelled the Washington Ballet to international status on the jetstream of his talent..." (February 21, 1985) The company conducted its first large scale overseas tour in 1984 and over the next few years performed in Europe, South America, and the Far East repeatedly, featuring programmes of Goh's choreography. In addition to Fives, some of the most well-known works he created for the Washington Ballet include Variations Serieuses, "Double Contrasts", Birds of Paradise, In the Glow of the Night, Unknown Territory, and Schubert Symphony. All of these ballets went on to enjoy performances with other companies worldwide. He remained committed to the Washington Ballet and gave a substantial portion of each year to his work with them. Goh's demanding schedule in the 1980s included ballets with Bat Dor Dance Company, the Paris Opera Ballet, Royal Danish Ballet, Joffrey Ballet and the Royal Swedish Ballet. Singapore recognized his talent as a choreographer by presenting him with the Cultural Medallion in 1986, the country's highest award for artistic achievement.

== Death and legacy ==
In 1987 Goh became seriously ill and after a very brief illness died on 28 November 1987 of an AIDS-related disease, viral colitis, at his home in New York City.

Before his death, Goh had decided that a foundation to further choreographic endeavors would be part of his legacy. Janek Schergen was chosen by Goh to be the artistic director of this endeavour. The Choo San Goh & H. Robert Magee Foundation was formed in 1992 and the centerpiece of it is its annual Choo San Goh Award for Choreography. Since that time numerous choreographers and dance companies have been given financial awards to create new dance works in an effort to further develop choreographic talent. The foundation also oversees the licensing of Goh's ballets in performances by dance companies throughout the world. Singapore Dance Theatre has added to their repertoire twelve of Goh's works, bringing his unique identity as a Singaporean choreographer back to his homeland.

In 1997 Singapore Dance Theatre commissioned a monograph on Goh entitled Goh Choo San, Master Craftsman in Dance. It contains a detailed overview of his life in written text and photos of his ballets. Singapore Dance Theatre mounted a successful retrospective of his works in 2007 entitled Legacy. Obituaries were published in the New York Times and the Washington Post on November 30, 1987.

== Personal life ==
Goh was born into a family of 10 children. His elder brother, Choo Chiat Goh, who founded the Goh Ballet Academy in Vancouver, B.C. His niece (daughter of Choo Chiat Goh), Chan Hon Goh was a principal dancer with the National Ballet of Canada and the Suzanne Farrell Ballet, Washington, D.C. His youngest sister Goh Soo Khim is co-founder and former artistic director of Singapore Dance Theatre, and elder sister Soo Nee Goh taught ballet in Vancouver B.C.

== Bibliography ==
- Schergen, Janek (1997). Goh Choo San, master craftsman in dance. Soo Khim Goh. [Singapore]: Singapore Dance Theatre. ISBN 981-00-9589-9. OCLC 38936479.
- Smith, Amanda (19 May 1981). "Choo San Goh Goes Dutch: The New Wunderkind of Dance". The Boston Phoenix.
