= Tony Then =

Singaporean dancer (1944–1995)

- Born: Anthony Then; 16 June 1944; Singapore
- Died: 16 December 1995 (aged 51)
- Occupations: Actor, dancer, choreographer, dance teacher

Anthony Then (16 June 1944 – 16 December 1995) was a Singaporean actor, dancer, choreographer and dance teacher who co-founded the Singapore Dance Theatre.

== Early life and education ==
Then grew up in a family of five siblings to parents who were fans of music (such as Latin, ballroom and rock and roll) and ballroom dancing, in particular the tango. As children at their parents' request, Then and his siblings performed dancing whenever they had guests. As a teenager, he learnt to play a number of musical instruments from the piano to accordion and castanets to maracas. However, it was his discovery of mambo music that strengthened his passion for dancing.

Whilst studying at St. Joseph's Institute, Then performed with his sister Yvonne in school concerts as part of the Literary, Debating and Dramatic Society, having learnt to tap-dance. Aged 14, he enrolled in the Singapore Ballet Academy (SBA) (where his sister was a student), staying for six years, studying under its founders and alongside peers including Goh Soo Khim and Goh Choo San. From there, he received a Royal Academy of Dance advanced certificate.

Despite having a short career as a draughtsman, Tony became overwhelmed by his interest in ballet. With his parents' blessing, he moved to England to study at Rambert Ballet, receiving scholarship in 1965. This was followed by stints, dancing with Scottish Ballet, London's West Theatre Ballet and Bremen Ballet Company. Unfortunately, while with Cologne Opera House, Then suffered a knee injury, putting him out of dancing for a while.

During this period, he studied choreography for two years at London's Institute of Choreography. After receiving his diploma, he spent five years teaching there before being appointed head of the jazz faculty.

In addition, to maintain himself financially, Then also worked as a waiter, model and actor. Here, he played one of the Transylvanians in musical movie The Rocky Horror Picture Show and made guest appearances in the Doctor Who classic The Talons of Weng-Chiang, The New Avengers and Gangsters.

== Career ==
In late 1977, Then returned to Singapore to work as director and choreographer of Neptune Theatre, training dancers in various types of music such as jazz and disco as well as teaching them how to sing. He also produced shows for Neptune Theatre. Two years later, he became ballet master at Nevada Dance Theatre. He also taught ballet in Singapore and Europe but the deaths of his parents in 1982 and 1985 respectively brought him back home.

Upon an invitation from Goh Soo Khim in 1983, Then became a guest teacher at the SBA. The duo would eventually become co-artistic directors of the Ballet Group within the National Dance Company. Eventually, they formed the Singapore Dance Theatre (SDT) -- Singapore's first professional dance company, which opened March 1988. Under their leadership, the company aimed to train dancers and budding choreographers. While teaching ballet, Then used the four D's to teach prospective students: desire to dance, determination, dedication and discipline.

Among Then's works for the company were Concerto for VII (1988), Schumann Impressions (1990) and notably, The Nutcracker. Directed by the choreographer/dancer, the production, staged in 1992, its centenary year at Kallang Theatre featured a cast of 140, consisting of dance teachers, students (including toddlers) and professional dancers from more than 40 ballet groups and schools. Running to two hours and costing S$350,000, it was the most expensive dance production at the time. A second production was staged two years later, again with Then at the helm.

In August 1995, Then retired as co-artistic director of SDT.

== Death ==
Then died on 16 December 1995 of unknown cause at the city's Communicable Disease Centre.
