= Martine van Hamel =

Dutch choreographer and teacher (born 1945)

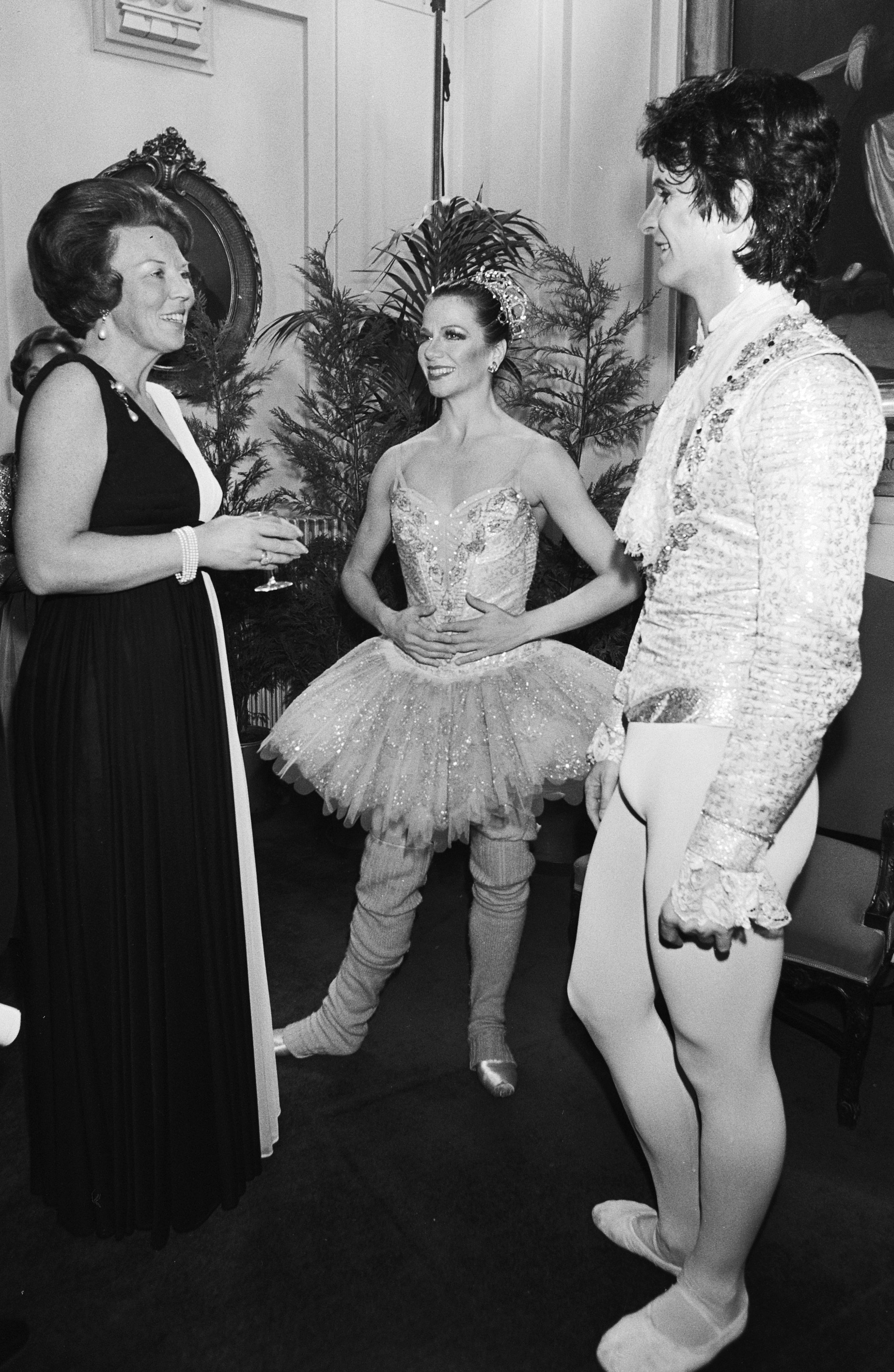
Queen Beatrix of the Netherlands, Martine van Hamel, and Kevin McKenzie in 1982

Martine van Hamel (born 16 November 1945) is a Dutch choreographer, director, teacher, retired ballerina and former Principal dancer at the National Ballet of Canada and American Ballet Theatre (ABT). She was a gold medalist at the biennial Varna International Ballet Competition, the most prestigious ballet competition in the world, held in Varna, Bulgaria. She is also a recipient of the Prix de Varna, a recognition rarely awarded, for best artistic interpretation in all categories. She was one of the leading classical ballerinas in America.

Van Hamel studied classical ballet in Denmark, the Netherlands, Indonesia, and Venezuela. She eventually went on to train at Canada's National Ballet School before joining the professional dance company, the National Ballet of Canada, as a soloist in 1963. She danced briefly with the Joffrey Ballet, then known as the City Center Joffrey Ballet, before joining ABT in 1970, one of the three leading classical ballet companies in the United States. She co-founded the New Amsterdam Ballet with Kevin McKenzie which toured and performed during the ABT off-season. Van Hamel left ABT in 1992 to dance with the Nederlands Dans Theater III until 1997.

Van Hamel was the recipient of the Cue Magazine award for outstanding dancer in 1976, the Dance Magazine Award in 1983, the Dance Educators of America's award in July 1989, and the Award for Excellence from Washington College in 1992. She has taught at the Juilliard School, the Jacqueline Kennedy Onassis School, and co-founded the Kaatsbaan International Dance Center.

== Early life and training ==
Born on 16 November 1945 in Brussels, van Hamel was the youngest of three siblings of Dutch parents. Her father, Diederik (Dick) Alfred van Hamel, was a diplomat stationed in Copenhagen. Her mother, Manette van Hamel (née Cramer), born in 1913 in Deventer, was a music teacher and violinist who played in a string quartet. Martine van Hamel began ballet lessons at the age of four in Copenhagen where it was common for children to study ballet. As a diplomat, her father was routinely stationed in different countries such as Denmark, the Netherlands, and Indonesia. It was difficult for her to find teachers but she took lessons when possible. While her father was stationed in Caracas, Venezuela, van Hamel, then age ten, took classes with Henry Danton from The Royal Ballet. Danton frequently guest taught at the National Ballet of Venezuela. In 1958, she moved to Canada to study at Canada's National Ballet School with Betty Oliphant.

== Career ==
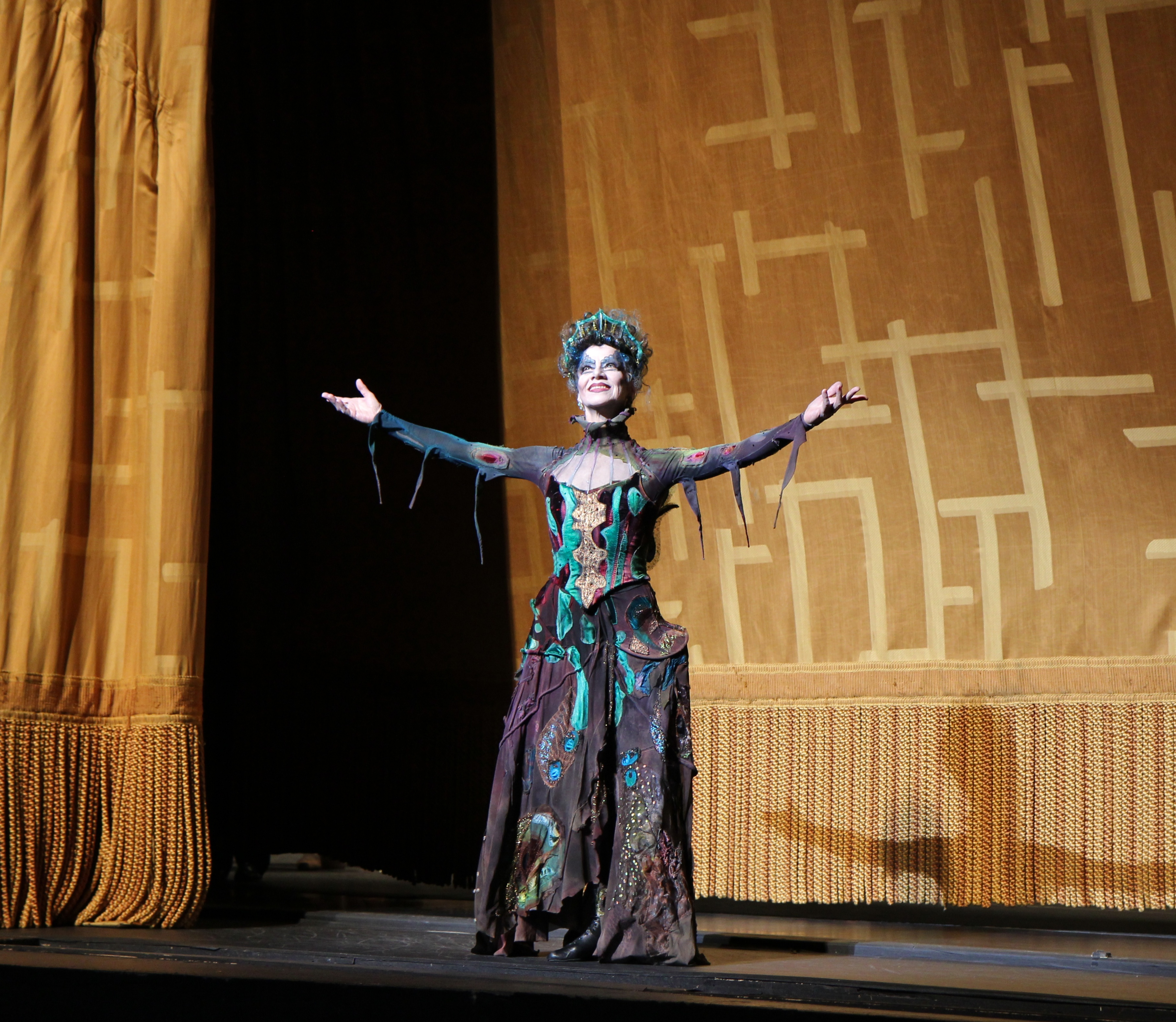
Martine van Hamel, American Ballet Theatre, Sleeping Beauty, 6 July 2013

Van Hamel graduated from the school and was promoted straight into the National Ballet of Canada as a soloist in 1963. She has credited Celia Franca, the Artistic Director, as being an important influence and coach during her development as a ballet dancer. She was promoted to the rank of principal dancer in 1965. Early in her career, she struggled with her weight. In an interview with Rose Eichenbaum, Van Hamel said, "I think there is a small window in your career when you have some control." She explained she was "about three pounds too heavy" and used weight as "a way of rebelling against all the forces that controlled my life."

At the third biennial 1966 Varna International Ballet Competition, the most prestigious dance competition in the world, Martine van Hamel won a gold medal. She danced variations from Marius Petipa's La Bayadère, Kenneth MacMillan's Solitaire, Antony Tudor's Dark Elegies, and the pas de deux from Le Corsaire with Earl Kraul. Van Hamel was also the recipient of the seldom awarded Prix de Varna for best artistic interpretation in all categories. She was welcomed back to Canada with a ticker-tape parade. She left the National Ballet of Canada in 1969 to dance for one year as soloist with the City Center Joffrey Ballet, now known as the Joffrey Ballet.

In 1970, van Hamel was offered a position in the corps de ballet at American Ballet Theatre, one of the three leading classical ballet companies in the United States. She was quickly promoted to soloist in 1971 and then to principal dancer in 1973. "She became established as one of the leading classical ballerinas in America," according to The Oxford Dictionary of Dance, which further described her as "a tall, strong dancer with a technique that embraced both a muscular power and a delicate expressiveness." Clive Barnes of The New York Times wrote "her persona is shy, but she is exceedingly womanly, and she bounces happily on the modest but confident trampoline of her personality." Diane Burns, the dance critic for the Orlando Sentinel, has called van Hamel the "American Ballet Theatre prima ballerina and one of the most formidable female dancers to emerge from the dance boom of the 1970s and early '80s." At 5 feet 7 inches (1.7 m) tall, van Hamel is difficult to partner because on pointe she is taller than many of her leading male counterparts. The Los Angeles Times noted that "she has lost coveted roles due to her height" despite "all the celebrated majesty of her dancing."

Van Hamel was the recipient of the 1976 Cue Magazine award for outstanding dancer. On 21 March 1983, she was the recipient of the Dance Magazine award alongside fellow recipients John Neumeier, director of the Hamburg Ballet; Michael Smuin, a director of the San Francisco Ballet; and Jeannot Cerrone, general manager of the Houston Ballet. The awards were presented by Francis Ford Coppola, Erik Bruhn, Leonard Bernstein and Jerome Robbins.

In the late 70s, van Hamel alongside ABT partner Kevin McKenzie, co-founded the New Amsterdam Ballet which was officially incorporated on 24 August 1982. Van Hamel served as the Artistic Director and McKenzie as the Associate Artistic Director and choreographer. During the ABT off-season, van Hamel, McKenzie, and other ABT dancers toured and performed with the New Amsterdam Ballet all over the world. The "semipermanent chamber group" focused on contemporary ballet works by new choreographers. The company continued to operate before closing in September 2013. In July 1989, van Hamel, Terry Orr, and Savion Glover received awards from Dance Educators of America for their work as dance teachers. Van Hamel has been a guest choreographer for companies such as The Washington Ballet, Milwaukee Ballet and the Royal Winnipeg Ballet.

After twenty years, she left ABT in 1991 and joined the Nederlands Dans Theater III. The same year, van Hamel, McKenzie, Gregory Cary, and Bentley Roton founded the Kaatsbaan International Dance Center as a facility to host national and international artists. There van Hamel has been the Program Director of Extreme Ballet, a three-week intensive training program, since its inception in 1991. In 1992, Washington College presented her with the Award for Excellence for her contributions in the arts. Van Hamel left Nederlands Dans Theater III in 1997 and worked as choreographer and director. She returned to ABT in 2004 to teach at the Jacqueline Kennedy Onassis School and to occasionally perform character roles with the professional dance company. She joined the faculty at the Juilliard School in the same year.

== Personal life ==
In 1972, van Hamel's father, Diederik, retired after serving as Consul General to the Netherlands in New York City. Along with Manette, his wife, they moved to Woodstock, New York. Diederik built and played the viola. Manette founded the Woodstock Chamber Orchestra and played the violin and piano. Her father died on 31 August 1997, and her mother, on 12 June 2012. Martine van Hamel has two siblings, Alfred and Jan-Willem.

Van Hamel married McKenzie, who is the Artistic Director of ABT. Since 1999, she has sung with the New York Choral Society.
