= Kevin McKenzie (dancer) =

American ballet dancer, choreographer, and director (born 1954)

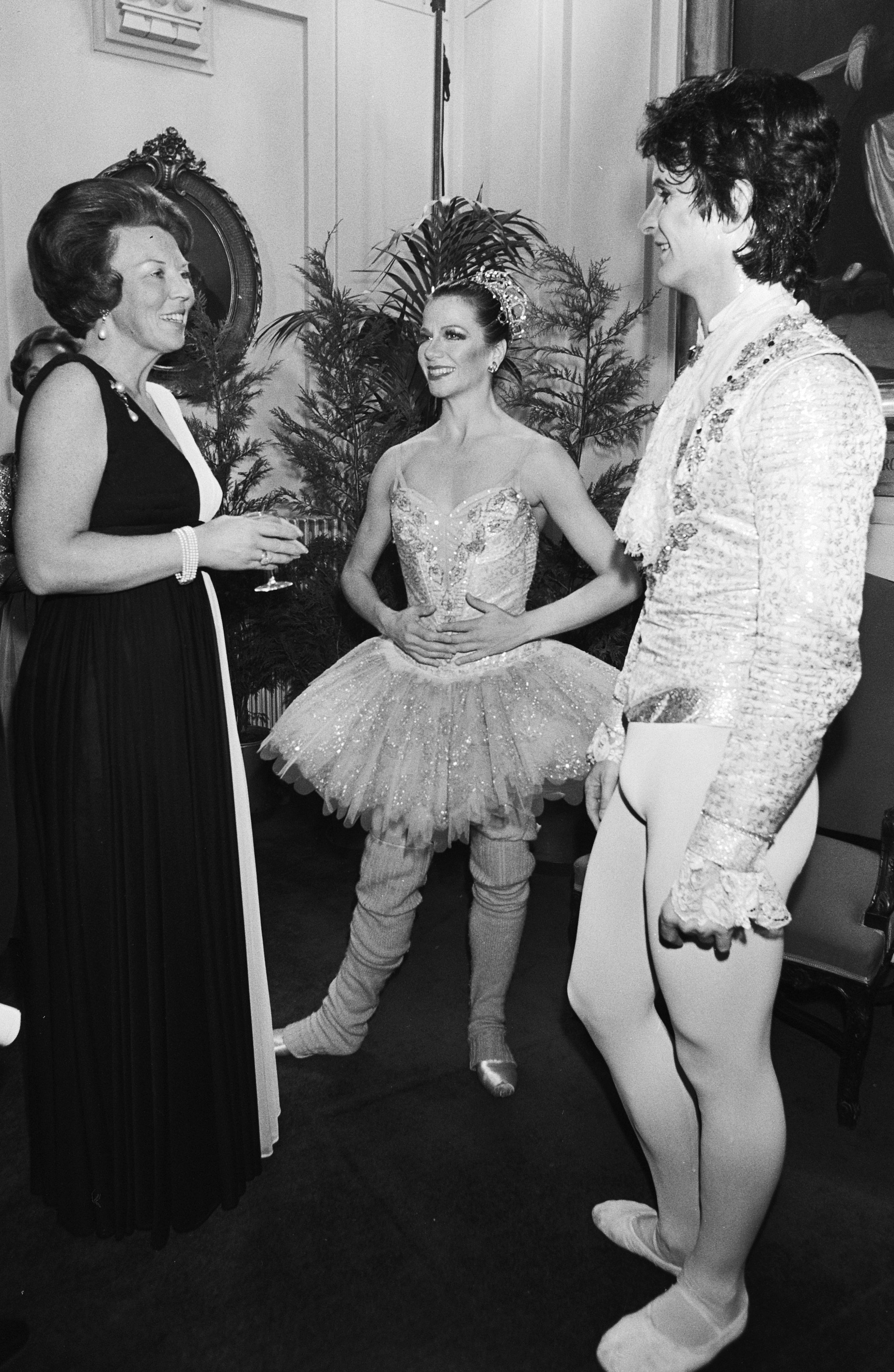
Queen Beatrix of the Netherlands, Martine van Hamel, and McKenzie in 1982

Kevin McKenzie (born April 29, 1954) is an American ballet dancer, choreographer, and director. A former principal dancer with American Ballet Theatre, he then served as the company's artistic director from 1992 to 2022.

== Early life and education ==
McKenzie was born on April 29, 1954, in Burlington, Vermont, the youngest of 11 children. He began dance lessons at the urging of his father, who was eager to see his son become the next Fred Astaire. Shortly after his first session at the O'Brien School of Dance, he found himself drawn more to ballet than tap dancing. Once the school informed Mr. and Mrs. McKenzie of their son and daughter's great talent, the two continued their studies at the Washington School of Ballet, under the directorship of Mary Day. Day created an environment that enabled dancers to explore their own talents and opinions. That training sparked and nurtured Kevin's interest in storytelling and character development, which led to a nearly lifelong fascination with ballet theater.

Following a year-long bout with ulcerative colitis, he spent his senior year preparing for the Varna International Ballet Competition. Its 1972 edition awarded him the silver medal for performance in the junior division. As a professional dancer, he trained with Maggie Black, as well as Georgina Parkinson, Twyla Tharp, Anthony Dowell, and others. He also worked on acting with Day throughout his career.

== Career ==
After his win, McKenzie joined The National Ballet, making his professional debut at the Kennedy Center in Les Sylphides. He left the company in 1974 to join the Joffrey Ballet, where he performed as a principal dancer. He initially turned down Joffrey to see if he could get into Ballet Theater, but, upon advice from a colleague, eventually accepted Joffrey's offer. Regarding his time with the company, he later said he "learned how to learn there." He believes that experience shaped him into an adult.

In 1979, he departed to join American Ballet Theatre as a soloist upon Edward Verso's recommendation. A year later, he was promoted to principal dancer. During his time at ABT, McKenzie danced all the repertoire's major roles, but performed best in princely ones. As a principal, he took on the Solo in La Bayadere, Don Jose in Carmen, the Prince in Mikhail Baryshnikov's production of the full-length Cinderella, Franz in Coppélia, the Gentleman with Her in Dim Lustre, Basil and Espada in Don Quixote (Kitri's Wedding), Albrecht in Giselle, the male lead in The Garden of Villandry, Her Lover in Jardin aux Lilas, the male lead in The Leaves Are Fading, the Friend in Pillar of Fire, the male lead in Raymonda (Grand Pas Hongrois), a featured role in Requiem, the Champion Roper in Rodeo, Romeo and Mercutio in Romeo and Juliet, Prince Desire in The Sleeping Beauty, Prince Siegfried in Swan Lake, James in La Sylphide and the male leads in Other Dances, Paquita, Les Sylphides, the Sylvia Pas de Deux and Theme and Variations. He created the role of Amnon in Martine van Hamel's Amnon V'Tamar and a leading one in Clark Tippet's S.P.E.B.S.Q.S.A. After retiring from ABT in 1991, he returned to The Washington Ballet as associate director to Mary Day. The following year, he returned to ABT to take over as artistic director. McKenzie believes strongly that ABT needs to "have the best it can possibly have," in terms of faculty members and administration.

As a professional dancer, McKenzie performed in cities worldwide, including Italy, Paris, London, and Tokyo. He guest danced with the London Festival Ballet, The Bolshoi Ballet, the National Ballet of Cuba, and The Universal Ballet in Seoul. He became permanent guest artist with The Washington Ballet in 1989. In 1991, he was appointed the company's associate artistic director of the company. He was also associate artistic director and a choreographer for Martine van Hamel's New Amsterdam Ballet. Before he rose to artistic director of ABT, in 1992, his choreographic credits included Groupo Zambaria (1984) and Liszt Études (1991), both choreographed for Martine van Hamel's New Amsterdam Ballet. He had also choreographed Lucy and the Count (1992) for The Washington Ballet. For American Ballet Theatre, he choreographed new productions of The Nutcracker (1993), Don Quixote (1995, in collaboration with Susan Jones), Swan Lake (2000), Raymonda (2004) with choreography by Anna-Marie Holmes, and The Sleeping Beauty in 2004 with Gelsey Kirkland and Michael Chernov. In 2014, he staged a new production of Raymond Divertissements with Irina Kolpakova.

When he took over ABT, it was $5.7 million in debt and on the brink of collapse. The new versions of The Nutcracker and Don Quixote, as well as the arrival of Paloma Herrera, strengthened the company's fortunes and Angel Corella whose performances proved box-office gold. Adopting a new guest-star strategy, McKenzie gathered the strongest roster of male ballet stars in the world to continue the company's box-office success. By the end of the 90's, performances from Julio Bocca, Jose Manuel Careno, Vladimir Malakhov, Corella, Ethan Stiefel, Alessandra Ferri, Julie Kent, Herrera, and Irina Dvorovenko ensured the company's ongoing rise. Though a few dancers, such as Gillian Murphy, David Hallberg, Marcelo Gomes, and Herman Cornejo, were promoted through the ranks, the more typical star-casting scheme had the unfortunate effect of suppressing opportunities for an upcoming generation of dancers

With the retirement of this wave of leading dancers over the course of the late aughts, McKenzie changed course on the company's policy of importing established stars by opening the Jacqueline Kennedy Onassis School to nurture the company's homegrown talent and appointing Alexei Ratmansky as Artist in Residence to shape ABT's future choreographically.

While the company continues to perform McKenzie's versions of Don Quixote and Swan Lake, his Nutcracker and The Sleeping Beauty have been replaced by Ratmansky's restorations. Even as he has continued to support Ratmansky's choreographic endeavors, McKenzie has also invested in commissioning new work from female choreographers, particularly Jessica Lang. McKenzie stresses the importance of versatility in dancers, and being open to new ideas and training. He has stated it is crucial to "produce a dancer who is thoughtful, well-developed, but in the absence of style." He also believes that individual teachers create great dancers, not necessarily schools or training programs as a whole. McKenzie stresses the importance of dancers bringing their own unique style to pieces. He calls on music a lot as a dancer and a choreographer. McKenzie usually works with dancers on the classical ballets, but believes dancers have to find what is universally truthful about their interpretations.

In March 2021, it was announced that McKenzie would step down from the American Ballet Theatre after the 2022 season.

== Awards ==
- Silver Medal from the Sixth International Ballet Competition in Varna, Bulgaria (1972)
- Honorary degree of Doctor of Arts from Saint Michael's College (1993)
- Dance Magazine Award (1999)
- Honorary degree of Doctor of Arts from Adelphi University (2019)
- Appeared in two Emmy Award-winning broadcasts, The Unicorn, the Gorgon and the Manticore (1970), and American Ballet Theatre in Le Corsaire (1998)
- Founding board member of Kaatsbaan International Dance Center in Tivoli, New York

== Media ==
McKenzie helmed ABT's presentation of Anna-Marie Holmes' Le Corsaire in 1995 and a decade later in his production of Swan Lake in 2005. Both performances were aired on PBS.

== Personal life ==
McKenzie spent his childhood growing up in a big family, and says that dynamic sustained him throughout his dance career. McKenzie is married to the former ballet star, Martine van Hamel. The two co-founded Kaatsbaan International Dance Center.
