= Céline Gittens =

Trinidadian ballerina

- Born: Trinidad
- Education: Goh Ballet Academy, Vancouver, British Columbia, Canada
- Occupation: ballerina
- Known for: principal dancer, Birmingham Royal Ballet, Birmingham, England
- Spouse: Kit Holder

Céline Gittens is a Trinidadian ballerina. She is a principal dancer at the Birmingham Royal Ballet, in Birmingham, England.

== Life ==
Gittens was born in Trinidad, where her mother was a ballet teacher; her father was an accountant. She began dancing when she was three years old. The family went to Canada when Gittens was nine, and from 2001 she trained at the Goh Ballet Academy in Vancouver, British Columbia. Seeking a dance career in the United Kingdom, she joined the Birmingham Royal Ballet, in Birmingham in the West Midlands of England, in 2006. There she was made first artist in 2009, soloist in 2011, first soloist in 2015, and principal in July 2016. A photograph of her performance opposite Tyrone Singleton in Faster by David Bintley, director of the Birmingham company, appeared on the cover of Dance Europe magazine in the summer of 2012.

On 5 October 2012, at the Birmingham Hippodrome in the Chinese Quarter of Birmingham, Gittens became the first black ballerina to dance the twin rôles of Odette and Odile in Swan Lake in the United Kingdom.

She completed a Master of Philosophy degree at the University of Birmingham in 2012. In the summer of 2014 she married Kit Holder, a soloist with the Birmingham company.

At the International Festival of Miami in 2018 she performed the grand pas de deux from The Sleeping Beauty and the balcony pas de deux from Romeo and Juliet. In 2019 she danced the rôle of the Queen of Hearts in Christopher Wheeldon's Alice's Adventures in Wonderland with The Australian Ballet.

== Reception ==
Gittens won the Solo Seal award of the Royal Academy of Dance in 2004, and in 2005 was gold medallist and "audience choice" in the Adeline Genée awards at the Genée International Ballet Competition of the academy in London. In 2006 she was a finalist in the annual Prix de Lausanne dance competition in Lausanne, in Switzerland.

In 2010 a Daily Telegraph reviewer noted her "exceptional poise and spirit" in Prokofiev's Romeo and Juliet. In 2012 The Observer wrote of her "beautifully fluent technique" and "strong dramatic presence". A Guardian reviewer spoke of her "regal amplitude and attack" in the Serenade by George Balanchine at the London Coliseum in 2015.

Of her performance at Sadler's Wells as Odette, the lead rôle in Tchaikovsky's Swan Lake, in 2015, The Times wrote that her dancing was "frail and beautiful and ... completely alluring", while her technique was "a fabulous combination of control and flamboyance"; the Daily Telegraph called it "a lovely legato performance".
