= Santha Bhaskar =

Singaporean dancer and choreographer (1939–2022)

- Born: Pankyamma Santhamma; 1939; Kerala, British Raj
- Died: 26 February 2022 (aged 82); Singapore
- Citizenship: Singapore
- Occupation(s): Dancer, dance teacher, choreographer
- Spouse: K. P. Bhaskar
- Awards: Cultural Medallion, Bintang Bakti Masyarakat, Pingat Jasa Gemilang, Singapore Women's Hall of Fame
- Career
- Dances: Bharatanatyam, Mohiniattam, Kathakali

Santha Bhaskar (1939 – 26 February 2022), née Pankyamma Santhamma was a Singaporean dancer, teacher, and choreographer. Born in India, she trained and performed in multiple classical Indian dance forms, including Mohiniyattam, Kathakali and Bharatanatyam. She performed and choreographed a number of well received dance productions in Singapore, and taught dance for several decades at the academy established by her husband as well as the National University of Singapore. Her work is known for incorporating elements of Thai, Chinese, and Malay dance, music, and culture into Indian classical dance. She is the recipient of several awards for her contributions to dance, including the Cultural Medallion, the Bintang Bakti Masyarakat (Public Service Star), the Pingat Jasa Gemilang (Meritorious Service Medal), and has been inducted into the Singapore Women's Hall of Fame.

== Early life and education ==
Pankyamma Santhamma was born in Kerala, British Raj, in 1939. As a child she was interested in mathematics and science and did not like dance, but was enrolled in lessons by her father, who thought she had a talent for it. She was taught classical dance, training in multiple traditions, including Mohiniyattam, Kathakali and Bharatanatyam. She studied with notable dancers and choreographers, including Kunchu Kurup, Ramunni Panicker, and Kutralam Ganesam Pillai.

She was enrolled to attend college and study math, science, and accounting, but did not complete her degree, and was instead entered by her parents into an arranged marriage at the age of 15 to K.P. Bhaskar, a classical dance performer who was 14 years older than her. He was already an established dance teacher in Singapore and had returned to India to find a wife who was also a dancer. After her marriage, she moved to Singapore with him, changing her name to Santha Bhaskar.

== Career ==
Bhaskar moved to Singapore with her husband, K.P. Bhaskar, in 1956. He had established a dance school in Singapore, known as the Bhaskar Academy of Dance (and later, the Bhaskar Arts Academy). Bhaskar began teaching there, eventually becoming the academy's artistic director and chief choreographer. She also frequently commuted to Malaysia, teaching Bharatanatyam there as well.

Bhaskar was known for her work in creating complex, multicultural productions, and frequently collaborated with Singaporean musicians, dancers to incorporate elements of Thai, Malay, and Chinese cultural practice, tradition, and music into Indian classical dance. She worked with Zubir Said, who composed Singapore's national anthem, to create music for her choreography, and along with her husband, adapted Chinese folk tales for dramatic dance productions. Her production, Vriksha, adapted Kuo Pao Kun’s The Silly Little Girl and The Old Tree as Bharatanatyam performances. One of her best known works of choreography is The Butterfly Lovers, based on a Chinese folk tale and narrated through Indian dance and music. In December 2021, The Butterfly Lovers was revived in a new production choreographed by Bhaskar's daughter, Meenakshy Bhaskar. She also collaborated with ballet dancer Goh Lay Kuan, and Malay dancer Som Said, exchanging techniques and skills in their respective fields.

Other well known works by Bhasker include Manohra, which incorporated elements of Thai and Chinese dance and was performed at the Singapore Arts Festival in 1996, and Rasa & Dhwani, which consisted of choreography based on poems composed by Singaporean poets in all four of Singapore's official languages, and was performed in 2003 at the Esplanade. In 2015, she was commissioned to recreate a Kathakali dance performance that she had previously choreographed and performed in 1954 at Singapore's Victoria Theatre, for the Singapore Arts Festival. In 2021, she choreographed and produced Marabu, a production about Indian migrants to Singapore and particularly sepoys, who worked as soldiers for the East India Company.

Along with her husband, she regularly performed and choreographed dance performances as part of the Aneka Ragam Rakyat, which were multicultural productions staged in Singapore in the 1960s. She also trained in Thai dance at Chulalongkorn University, and later performed and choreographed productions that fused Thai and Indian dance forms. In 2016 and 2017, she collaborated with the National University of Singapore's Centre for Quantum Technologies to create and choreograph a dance that represented the movement of particles. She later created similar collaborations with NUS' Department of Mathematics, and the Faculty of Science. Bhaskar has expressed her admiration for Singapore's multicultural society, stating, "I’m very Singaporean in my soul and I cannot be separated into [different cultures]."

From 1977 onward, she taught also Indian dance at the National University of Singapore, establishing a course that she taught for over forty years, and eventually becoming the artistic director and resident choreographer at the NUS Center for the Arts. In 1987, she and her husband established Nrityalaya Aesthetics Society, a school that has taught over 2000 students the arts, including dance, music, and theater.

== Personal life ==
Bhaskar had three children, and her daughter is a dancer, teacher and choreographer. She died at the age of 82, on 26 February 2022, after falling unwell while attending the second night of the Grand Celebration performance to celebrating the Bhaskar Arts' Academy's 70th anniversary.

== Awards and honors ==
During the course of her career, Bhaskar received multiple awards and honors in Singapore, and in 1968, was commemorated on a stamp issued by the Singapore Post Office. Her other awards and honors include:

- 1975: Natya Rani (Queen of Dance) Award by the Singapore Indian Film and Dramatic Society
- 1975: Kala Ratna (Jewel of the Art) Award by the Singapore Indian Fine Arts Association
- 1990: Cultural Medallion, Singapore
- 2016: Public Service Star, Singapore
- 2021: Meritorious Service Medal, Singapore
- 2021: Inducted into the Singapore Women's Hall of Fame
