= Ken Hatfield (musician) =

American jazz guitarist (born 1952)

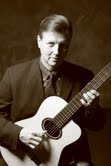
- Ken Hatfield

Background information
- Birth name: Kenneth David Hatfield
- Born: November 18, 1952 (age 72); Portsmouth, Virginia, U.S.
- Genres: Jazz, classical
- Occupation(s): Musician, composer, educator, author
- Instrument: Guitar
- Website: kenhatfield.com

Kenneth David Hatfield (born November 18, 1952) is an American jazz guitarist, who is also a composer, arranger, producer, and educator.

== Biography ==
Born Kenneth David Hatfield in Portsmouth, Virginia, Hatfield grew up in Norfolk, Virginia and began his formal guitar instruction with John Griggs at the Griggs School of Music in 1967. At the Griggs School Hatfield was introduced to the classical and jazz guitarists of the time such as Andrés Segovia, Wes Montgomery, Django Reinhardt and Johnny Smith. As a teenager growing up in the Tidewater, Virginia area, Hatfield met and played professionally with some of the area's most popular jazz musicians, including Joe Jones, Jimmy Barbour, and Philippe Fields.

After graduating from Lake Taylor High School in Norfolk in 1971, Hatfield attended the Berklee College of Music in Boston, where he established himself as a leading student. He joined the faculty after his first year and remained an adjunct professor for the next two years. Then he left Berklee to pursue a career as a professional musician. He travelled throughout the U.S. and Canada before settling in Baltimore, Maryland. Hatfield remained in Baltimore for two years, working as a member of the R&B group Pockets, playing local jazz gigs and frequently augmenting Charlie Byrd's trio.

In 1976 Hatfield moved to New York City, where he worked with the jazz organ groups of Jimmy McGriff and Jack McDuff. Hatfield later became a member of Chico Hamilton's group Euphoria while pursuing a career as a studio musician. His career as a session sideman fed his increasing interest in composition and arranging. This interest led to his return to academia to further his studies in composition, with an emphasis on counterpoint.

In addition to composing jazz works for his own ensembles, he has written chamber pieces that range from solo classical guitar to string quartet and mixed ensembles of various sizes. He has composed choral works and ballet scores, including commissioned works for Judith Jamison, The Washington Ballet, and the Maurice Béjart Ballet Company. He has written scores for television and film, including Eugene Richards's award-winning documentary but, the day came. Arthur Circle Music has published five books of Hatfield's compositions, and in 2005 Mel Bay published his book Jazz and the Classical Guitar: Theory and Application, which is designed to demonstrate his approach to playing jazz on a classical guitar.

In June 2006 Hatfield received the ASCAP Foundation's Jazz Vanguard Award for "innovative and distinctive music that is charting new directions in jazz".

== Discography ==
=== As leader ===
- Music for Guitar and Bass (Arthur Circle Music, 1998)
- Explorations for Solo Guitar (Arthur Circle, 1999)
- Dyad (Arthur Circle, 2000)
- Phoenix Rising (Arthur Circle, 2002)
- The Surrealist Table (Arthur Circle, 2003)
- String Theory (Arthur Circle, 2005)
- Etudes for Solo Guitar in 24 Keys (Arthur Circle, 2008)
- Ken Hatfield and Friends Play the Music of Bill McCormick (2008)

== Books ==
- Etudes for Solo Guitar in 24 Keys (with companion CD), Arthur Circle Music, New York, 2008
- Jazz and the Classical Guitar: Theory and Application (with companion CD), Mel Bay Publications, Pacific, MO, 2005
- New York Suite for Solo Guitar, Arthur Circle Music, New York, 1999
- Sonata in E Major for Solo Guitar, Arthur Circle Music, New York, 1998
- Nine Jazz Duets for Guitar and Bass, Arthur Circle Music, New York, 1998
- Two-Part Contrapuntal Etudes for Guitar, HLH Music Publications, New York, 1998
