= Choo Chiat Goh =

Chinese ballet dancer, choreographer

- Born: 1939 (age 86–87); Singapore
- Occupation: Ballet dancer
- Years active: 1960 -
- Known for: Goh Ballet Academy

Choo Chiat Goh (born 1939) is a Chinese ballet dancer, choreographer, and the founder of the Goh Ballet Academy, Canada, along with his wife Lin Yee.

== Early life ==
Goh was born in Singapore, into a family of 10 children. His parents were Chinese, and spoke Mandarin. He joined the Royal Ballet School in England at the age of 14, and subsequently trained under dancer and choreographer Pyotr Gusev in China. In 1959, he graduated from the Beijing Dance Academy.

== Career ==
After training, he became a principal dancer at the National Ballet of China. The Cultural Revolution of 1966 - 1976 changed the way ballet was performed in China. He went to Canada to visit his sick mother and remained there, and started the Goh Ballet Academy.

== Personal life ==
Goh is married to Lin Yee, also a ballet dancer. Their daughter is Chan Hon Goh. One of Goh's sisters, Soonee Goh, trained at the Royal Ballet School in London and co-founded the Singapore Ballet Academy in Singapore. Another sister, Soo Khim Goh, trained at the Australian Ballet School, and was the co-founder of the Singapore Dance Theatre in 1988.

== Award ==
- 2017 - Lifetime Achievement Award - by Vancouver Mayor, Gregor Robertson
- 2013 - Queen Elizabeth II Diamond Jubilee Medal - by MP Hedy Fry
