= Mary Day (dance teacher) =

American ballet teacher and arts administrator

Mary Henry Day (January 25, 1910 – July 11, 2006) was an American ballet teacher and arts administrator. She was the founder of The Washington Ballet and served as its artistic director until 1997.

== Early life ==
Mary Henry Day was born on January 25, 1910, in Washington, D.C., and grew up in Foggy Bottom. She began studying ballet when she was eleven years old. At fifteen she began studying ballet with Lisa Gardiner at the King Smith School. Day then moved to England where she studied at the Royal Academy of Dance. After she graduated, she returned to Washington and taught private dance lessons and choreographed children's ballets at local high schools.

== Career ==
Day co-founded The Washington School of Ballet with Lisa Gardiner in 1944. She became the sole director of the school in 1958, after Gardiner's death. In 1967 she reorganized the school and founded an associated professional company, The Washington Ballet. In 1997 she announced she would retire from the ballet, officially ending her tenure at the company in 1999, continuing to serve as director of the school until 2004. She died on July 11, 2006.

Pupils of the school during Day's tenure included Shirley MacLaine and Georgia Engel.

== Legacy ==
Elvi Moore, former general director of The Washington Ballet, wrote a book on Day titled Mary Day: Grande Dame of Dance in the Nation's Capital.
