= Goh Soo Khim =

- Born: 1944 (age 81–82); Singapore
- Education: Singapore Ballet Academy; Australian Ballet School
- Spouse: Daniel Teo
- Relatives: Sister: Goh Soo Nee; Brothers: Goh Choo San; Goh Choo Chiat; Niece: Goh Chan Hon

Goh Soo Khim (simplified Chinese: 吴素琴; traditional Chinese: 吳素琴; pinyin: Wú Sù Qín) is a Singaporean ballerina and a doyen in Singapore’s dance scene. She is also the co-founder and artistic director of Singapore Dance Theatre. She is also credited for the development of ballet in Singapore, and for nurturing many successful dancers under her tutelage, to become successful dancers, soloists and even choreographers over the years.

== Early life ==
Goh was born into a family of well-known dancers and choreographers and received early training at the Singapore Ballet Academy under one of the Academy’s founders, her elder sister Goh Soo Nee (吴素妮), and the other founding directors, Frances Poh and Vernon Martinus. In 1964 Goh furthered her professional training in Australia, as the first Asian to be admitted into the all-white Australian Ballet School in Melbourne. Returning to Singapore upon her graduation from Australian Ballet School, Goh joined her sister as a principal trainer at the Ballet Academy. She was also a principal dancer of the academy and performed many solo performances.

== Career ==
In 1971, Goh assumed the responsibilities of director and principal of the Academy. In 1977, Goh represented Singapore in the 2nd ASEAN Radio and Television Cultural Exchange Programme, and in 1978 choreographed the performance Temple Tone Poem. It was her maiden choreography, and in 1980 choreographed again in the Goodbye Again (1980). Her specially commissioned works, Dilemma and Five Emotions were premiered at the 1982 Singapore Arts Festival.

Goh was appointed co-artistic director by the Ministry of Culture in 1984, to nurture the Ballet Group of the National Dance Company. The group performed her specially commissioned ballet, Environmental Phases, which won acclaim for its originality in the 5th ASEAN Festival of Performing Arts in 1985. Goh collaborated with Anthony Then to produce At The Ballet and Ballet Premiere for the Singapore Festival of Arts in 1984 and 1986.

In 1988, Goh and Then co-founded the Singapore Dance Theatre.

Her first choreography for the Singapore Dance Theatre was Brahm’s Sentiments, which premiered in the company’s second season. In 1990, she restaged Environmental Phases for Singapore Dance Theatre in a celebratory concert for Singapore’s 25th Anniversary. More recently, Goh has been actively providing opportunities for dancers to develop their potential as choreographers. She had been invited to adjudicate ballet competitions in Malaysia, Indonesia and is also on the international panel for the Asia Pacific Ballet Competition in Japan since 1991. She became the first Asian representative to be invited as a jury member for the prestigious Benois de la Danse Prix in Moscow in April 2003.

== Personal life ==
Goh was born into a family of 10 children.

Goh's elder brother, Choo Chiat Goh, founded the Goh Ballet Academy in Vancouver, B.C., while his daughter, Chan Hon Goh, was a principal dancer with the National Ballet of Canada and the Suzanne Farrell Ballet, Washington, D.C. Her elder sister, Soo Nee Goh, taught ballet in Vancouver, B.C. Goh is also the elder sister of ballet maestro Goh Choo San.

== Awards ==
Goh was awarded the Cultural Medallion in 1981 and the Pingat Bakti Masyarakat (Public Service Medal) in 1989 for her outstanding contributions to the development of dance in Singapore.

In 2002, she was awarded a Fellowship of LASALLE-SIA College of the Arts.

Goh was inducted into the Singapore Women's Hall of Fame in 2014.

== See also ==
- Goh Choo San
- Singapore Dance Theatre
