= Goh Ballet Academy =

Ballet school in Vancouver, Canada

Coordinates: 49°15′49″N 123°6′4″W

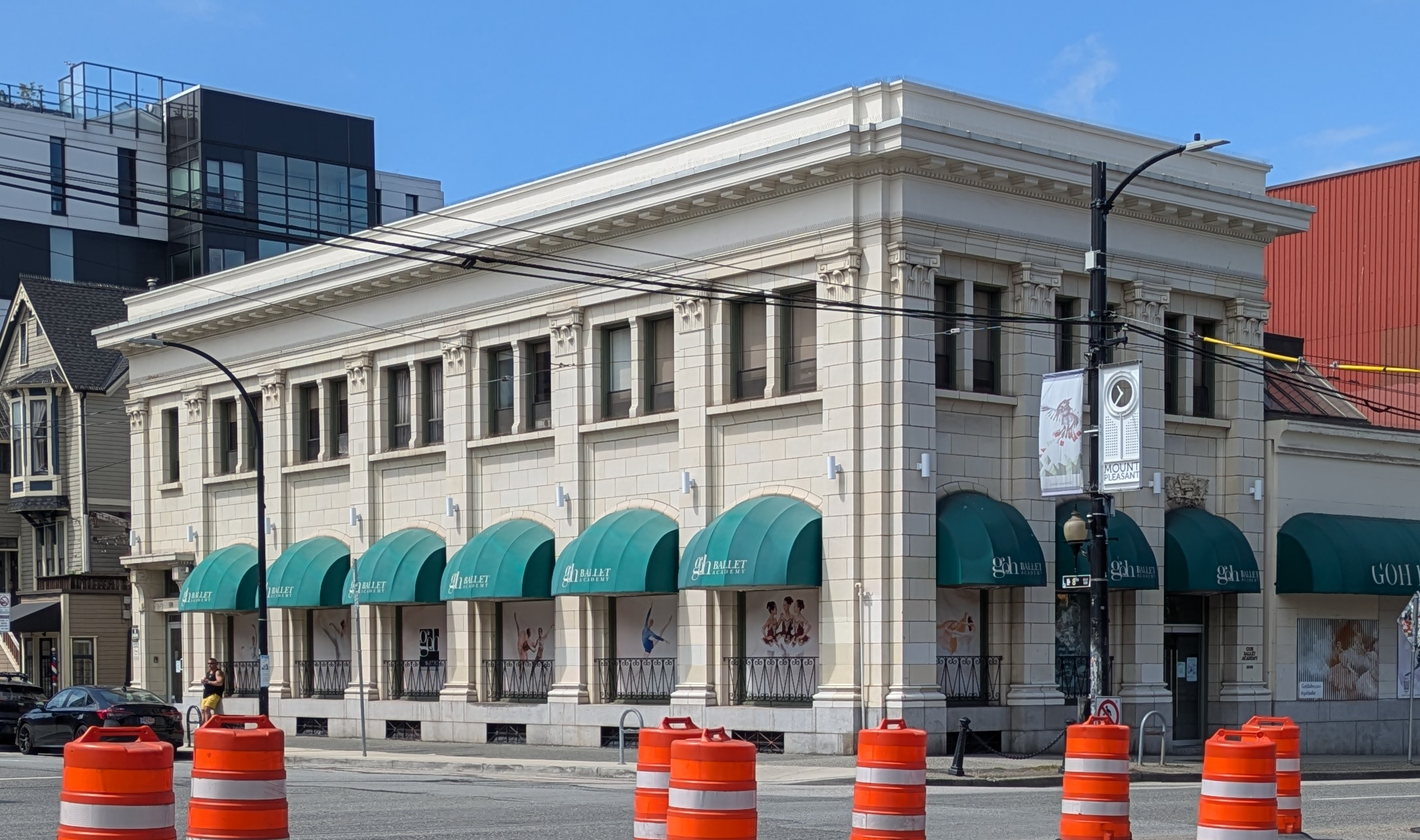
Goh Ballet

Goh Ballet Academy is a school of classical ballet in Vancouver, British Columbia, founded in 1978 by Choo Chiat Goh and Lin Yee Goh.

== History ==
The Goh Ballet Academy was founded in 1978, by Choo Chiat Goh and Lin Yee Goh after they immigrated to Canada from China. Choo Chiat Goh trained on a scholarship at London’s The Royal Ballet, the Beijing Dance Academy and in 1959 he joined the National Ballet of China. His wife, Lin Yee Goh trained in the same academy as him, eventually becoming one of the National Ballet of China’s ballet mistresses. She incorporated Royal Academy of Dance's curriculum into the academy and taught the Vaganova method. She studied techniques and teaching elements under Russian master Nikolai Romancheva.

The Gohs' daughter, Chan-hon Goh, was a principal dancer of the National Ballet of Canada for 20 years and is the current director of the academy. Chan Hon Goh was also a recipient of the Prix de Lausanne, an annual international competition for the youth in Switzerland who seek to pursue professional careers. As the academy's director, Chan Hon Goh has introduced a master class series for aspiring dancers seeking to enhance their professional training, provide opportunities for featured artists to mentor participants and focus on artistic elements not typically featured in standard ballet classes.

== Tours ==
Goh Ballet has toured in Malaysia, Singapore, Japan, People’s Republic of China, Hong Kong, and the United States. In 1994, the Youth Company was the first Canadian institution to be asked to perform at Rencontres Internationales de la Danse Festival in La Baule, France. While at the festival, the performance received eight curtain calls.

=== Performances ===
Since 2009, the Goh Ballet has produced its own performance of The Nutcracker with commissioned choreography by Anna-Marie Holmes. Executive producer of Vancouver's Nutcracker ballet, Chan-hon Goh described the show as "Its own entity...meant for the city."

=== Awards ===
- Outstanding School Award (Youth America Grand Prix 2008)
- Outstanding Champion for the Arts (Arts and Culture Week 2008)
- Solo Seal Award (Royal Academy of Dance) (20 students have achieved the highest examination honour)
- Canadian Immigrant Top 25 Award 2017

=== Founders awards ===
- YWCA Women of Distinction Award (2013)
- Queen Elizabeth II Diamond Jubilee Medal (2013)
- FMA Vancouver Art Achievement Award (2010)
- National Association of Asian American Professionals 100 Award (NAAAP) (2010)
- Genée International Ballet Competition – Silver Medal (1988)
- Illustrious Prix de Lausanne – Prize (1986)

== Notable alumni ==
- Frances Chung, principal dancer of San Francisco Ballet
- Yuka Ebihara, principal dancer of Polish National Ballet
- Céline Gittens, principal dancer of Birmingham Royal Ballet
- Chan-hon Goh, director of Goh. Ballet Academy, former principal dancer of National Ballet of Canada
