= The Washington Ballet =

Ensemble of professional ballet dancers

General information
- Name: The Washington Ballet
- Year founded: 1976
- Founder: Mary Day
- Website: www.washingtonballet.org

Artistic staff
- Artistic Director: Edwaard Liang

Other
- Official school: The Washington School of Ballet (TWSB)

The Washington Ballet (TWB) is an ensemble of professional dancers based in Washington, D.C. It was founded in 1976 by Mary Day and has been directed by Edwaard Liang since 2024.

== The Mary Day years (1976–1999) ==
Mary Day (née Mary Henry Day; 25 January 1910 – 11 July 2006), a native of Washington, and her mentor, Lisa Gardiner (né Elizabeth C. Gardiner; 1894–1958), established the Washington School of Ballet in 1944. In the 1950s, a pre-professional group of dancers trained at the school joined to perform at the National Cathedral and the D.C. Department of Recreation with the National Symphony Orchestra. This group also toured New York, West Virginia, and the Dominican Republic, where the troupe performed with Alicia Alonso in 1956.

In 1961, the Washington Ballet School premiered Day's The Nutcracker with the National Symphony Orchestra in Constitution Hall. In 1976, Day started The Washington Ballet, a company providing a professional showcase for the students of The Washington School of Ballet. Funded by a grant from the National Endowment for the Arts, Day hired Peter Grigsby as the first administrative director who took advantage of the Department of Labor's Comprehensive Employment and Training Act to hire dancers. He was followed by Alton Miller as director who expanded the touring of the company. The Washington Ballet founding company members included Madelyn Berdes, Patricia Berrend, James Canfield, Sharon Caplan, Robin Conrad, Lynn Cote, Laurie Dameron, John Goding, Robin Hardy, Jon Jackson, Brian Jameson, Terry Lacy, Christine Matthews, Ricardo Mercado, Julie Miles, Patricia Miller, Philip Rosemond, Helen Sumerwell and Allison Zusi.

=== Resident choreographer Goh ===
The company's first season consisted of three works by an up-and-coming choreographer/dancer from the Dutch National Ballet, Goh Choo San, who was resident choreographer at the founding of the company and later became associate artistic director. Goh's teaching and choreographic demands in his first two years in Washington DC moved the company from being described as "pre-professional" to solidly professional level, with Mikhail Baryshnikov showing interest in, and eventually dancing with, the company and Goh's choreography in 1979.

In 1980, 17-year-old company member Amanda McKerrow was chosen as one of nine dancers to compete on the official U.S. dance team at the Fourth International Ballet Competition in Moscow. She partnered with Simon Dow and won the gold medal, becoming the first United States citizen to win the competition. During the 1980s and 1990s, The Washington Ballet performed full seasons in Washington, D.C., and toured internationally to China, Japan, Malaysia, Singapore, Russia, Spain, and South America.

During his time at The Washington Ballet until his death in November 1987, Goh choreographed 19 ballets for the company.

=== Post-Goh years ===
Mary Day stepped down as artistic director of the company in 1999 and retired as school director in 2003. She died in 2006.

== The Septime Webre years (1999–2016) ==
In 1999, Septime Webre, a Cuban-American, joined The Washington Ballet as the artistic director. Works created for the Washington Ballet by Webre include Juanita y Alicia (2000), Carmen (2001), Journey Home (2002), Cinderella (2003), Oui/Non (2006), and State of Wonder (2006), as well as Carmina Burana, Fluctuating Hemlines, Where the Wild Things Are, and Peter Pan. The company has staged the works of such contemporary choreographers as George Balanchine, Twyla Tharp, Christopher Wheeldon, Mark Morris, Trey McIntyre, Edwaard Liang, and Nacho Duato, in addition to the more classical ballets, like Giselle, Coppélia, and La Sylphide. In October 2000, Webre led The Washington Ballet on an historic tour of Havana, making it the first American ballet company to perform in Cuba since 1960. In 2004, the Washington Ballet premiered Webre's The Nutcracker a special DC version that had never before been shown and that is being performed for the 20 time this year 2024. Webre created his takes on The Great Gatsby in 2010 and The Sun Also Rises in 2013.

Webre also initiated DanceDC, the Washington Ballet's outreach and education program that combines creative movement with an integrated language arts curriculum for D.C. public school children. Classical pre-ballet technique is taught to interested DanceDC students through a unique scholarship program called EXCEL! Nine boys and nine girls from the DanceDC schools are selected annually to receive on-site professional ballet technique training for an hour once a week at The Washington School of Ballet. In 2005, the company began The Washington Ballet at the Town Hall Education, Arts and Recreation Campus (TWB@THEARC), a home to community programs by the company as well as a branch of the Washington School of Ballet east of the Anacostia River.

== Julie Kent (2016-2023) ==
In February 2016, Webre announced he'd be stepping down at the end of June. A month later, the company announced Julie Kent, recently retired after dancing with the American Ballet Theatre for 29 years, would take the company's reins starting July 1, 2016. In October 2022, it was announced that Kent would leave the company at the end of the 2022-23 season after accepting an artistic director position at Houston Ballet.

== Edwaard Liang (2023-present) ==
In October 2023, the company announced Edwaard Liang as the incoming artistic director. He officially began directing the company in the spring of 2024.

== Repertoire ==
Title	Choreographer	Music	Date performed (* refers to premiere)
Agon	George Balanchine	Igor Stravinsky, Agon	September 17, 1999
Allegro Brillante	George Balanchine	Peter Ilyich Tchaikovsky's unfinished "Third Piano Concerto"	February 23, 1983
Always, No Sometimes	Trey McIntyre	The Beatles	May 10, 2006*
Antonio	Nils Christe	Antonio Vivaldi	May 19, 1999*
Apollo	George Balanchine	Igor Stravinsky	February 23, 1989
Aubade	Christian Holder	JS Bach, "Suite No. 1 in G major for Unaccompanied Cello"	May 17, 1995*
Before Nightfall	Nils Christe	Bohuslav Martinu, "Double Concerto for Two String Orchestras, Piano and Timpani"	February 15, 1991
Birds of Paradise	Choo San Goh	Alberto Ginastera, "Concierto para Arpa y Orquesta"	October 26, 1979*
Blue Until June	Trey McIntyre	Songs made famous by Etta James	October 11, 2000
Boléro	Nicolo Fonte	Maurice Ravel	April 15, 2010
Brahms on Edge	Karole Armitage	Johannes Brahms	April 15, 2010
Brief Fling	Twyla Tharp	Michel Colombier and Percy Grainger	February 20, 2002
Brouillards	John Cranko	Claude Debussy, "Preludes"	May 15, 1990
Brother, Brother	Ntsikelelo Cekwana	Antonio Vivaldi, "Gloria Magnificat"	September 27, 1995
Carmen	Septime Webre	Georges Bizet	November 1, 2001*
Carmina Burana	Septime Webre	Carl Orff	February 10, 2000
Cinderella	Septime Webre	Sergei Prokofiev	May 28, 2003*
Concerto Barocco	George Balanchine	Johann Sebastian Bach, "Concerto in D minor for Two Violins"	May 1, 1977
Coppélia	Arthur Saint-Leon	Léo Delibes	March 31, 2004
Danses Concertantes	Nils Christe	Igor Stravinsky, "Danses Concertantes"	October 28, 1993
Danzon	John Goding	Alberto Ginastera, "Piano Sonatas No. 1 and 2"	May 16, 1995
Dark Elegies	Antony Tudor	Gustav Mahler	February 21, 2002
Don Quixote	Anna-Marie Holmes after Marius Petipa	Ludwig Minkus	October 15, 2009*
Double Contrasts	Choo San Goh	Francis Poulenc, "Concerto in D minor for Two Pianos and Orchestra"	April 23, 1978*
Dumky Variations	Ray Barra	Antonín Dvořák, "Piano Trio in E minor (Dumky), Op. 90"	February 13, 1991*
Esplanade	Paul Taylor	Johann Sebastian Bach	October 15, 1987
Evening	Graham Lustig	Benjamin Britten, "Serenade for Tenor, Horn, and Strings Op 31"	November 2, 1994
The Eyes That Gently Touch	Kirk Peterson	Philip Glass, "Mad Rush"	February 22, 2000
La Fille Mal Gardée	Fernand Nault	Wilhelm Hertel	October 16, 1986
The Firebird	Robert Weiss	Igor Stravinsky	October 1, 2003
Fives	Choo San Goh	Ernest Bloch, "Concerto Grosso No. 1 for String Orchestra," Movements I, II, IV	February 12, 1978*
Fluctuating Hemlines	Septime Webre	Tigger Benford, commissioned	April 26, 2000
The Four Temperaments	George Balanchine	Paul Hindemith	May 10, 1989
Giselle	Jean Coralli, Jules Perrot and Marius Petipa	Adolphe Adam	October 20, 2004
The Great Gatsby	Septime Webre	Compiled, composed and arranged by Billy Novick	February 25, 2010
A Handel Celebration	Vicente Nebrada	George Frederick Handel, 12 selections from "Water Music" and "The Royal Fireworks"	November 10, 1982
Hansel and Gretel	Rick McCullough	Engelbert Humperdinck, "Hänsel und Gretel"	February 23, 1995*
Holberg Suite	John Cranko	Edvard Grieg, "Holberg Suite"	October 10, 1990
Icare	Lynn Cote	Rene Dupere, "Icare"	June 1996*
In the Glow of the Night	Choo San Goh	Bohuslav Martinu, "Symphony No. 1," Movements I, II, III	March 10, 1982*
In the Middle, Somewhat Elevated	William Forsythe	Thom Willems	October 1, 2003
In the Night	Jerome Robbins	Frédéric Chopin	October 25, 2006
In the Upper Room	Twyla Tharp	Philip Glass	October 25, 2006
Interlaced	Lynn Cote	Thomas Wilbrandt, "The Electric V — A New Perspective on Vivaldi's Four Seasons"	May 8, 1996*
Jeux	Toer van Schayk	Claude Debussy, "Jeux," (Poeme Danse 1913)	May 10, 1989
Juanita y Alicia	Septime Webre	Cuban, performed by Sin Miedo ("Chan Chan" by Francisco Repilado; "El Carretero" by Guillermo Portables; "Solamente Percusión" by Alfredo Mojica, Jr., Joseito Lopez, and Ralph Eskanazi;"Orguellecida" by Eliseo Silveira; "Dos Gardenias" by Isolina Carillo; "El Cuarto de Tula" by Sergio Siabo)	September 17, 2000*
Journey Home	Septime Webre	Sweet Honey In The Rock	April 4, 2002*
The Leaves Are Fading	Antony Tudor	Antonín Dvořák, Cypresses for string quartet, with additional music for strings	February 10, 2000
Men of Kooraloona	Lynn Cote	Frank Martin, "Second Concerto pour Piano et Orchestra, Con Moto"	May 16, 1996*
A Midsummer Night's Dream	Peter Anastos	Felix Mendelssohn	March 20, 1997
A Midsummer Night's Dream	George Balanchine	Felix Mendelssohn	January 21, 2004
Momentum	Choo San Goh	Sergei Prokofiev, "Piano Concerto No. 1 in D flat, Op. 10"	October 21, 1983
Morphoses	Christopher Wheeldon	György Ligeti	March 28, 2007
Mysteries	John Goding	Music and words by Ysaye M. Barnwell, "Would You Harbor Me" and "Breaths" with words by Birago Diop, and Aisha Kahlil, "Mystic Oceans" and "Listen to the Rhythm"; Bernice Johnson Reagon, "I Remember, I Believe" and "Sometime"	May 8, 1996*
Na Floresta	Nacho Duato	Heitor Villa-Lobos, Wagner Tiso	September 17, 2000
Nexus	Lynn Cote	Maritri Garrett and Shana Tucker, commissioned	September 27, 1995*
A Night at the Ballet	Matthew Diamond	Emmanuel Chabrier: "Danse Slave", "Habanera", "España"	October 24, 1984*
Nine Sinatra Songs	Twyla Tharp	Frank Sinatra	November 2, 2005
Nuages	Jiří Kylián	Claude Debussy, Nuages	February 22, 2000
The Nutcracker	Mary Day/Martin Buckner after Marius Petipa/Lev Ivanov	Peter Ilyich Tchaikovsky	December 1961
The Nutcracker	Septime Webre	Peter Ilyich Tchaikovsky	December 10, 2004*
Oui/Non	Septime Webre	Various artists. Vocalist: Karen Akers	October 25, 2006*
Our Town	Philip Jerry	Aaron Copland, "Our Town," "The Red Pony," "Fanfare for the Common Man"	February 16, 1996
Overstepping	Monica Levy	Eve Beglarian, commissioned	May 15, 1991*
Pas de Quatre	Anton Dolin after Jules Perrot's original work	Cesare Pugni	May 12, 1982
Passing By	Krzysztof Pastor	Johann Sebastian Bach	May 13, 1998*
Peter Pan	Septime Webre	Carmen DeLeone	January 31, 2003
Piazzolla Caldera	Paul Taylor	Astor Piazzolla and Jerzy Peterburshsky	January 31, 2007
The Poet Acts	Septime Webre	Philip Glass, from the motion picture soundtrack of The Hours	October 1, 2003*
Pomp	Dwight Rhoden	Antonio Carlos Scott	April 26, 2000
Quartet 2	Nils Christe	Dmitri Shostakovich, "String Quartet No. 11"	May 15, 1990
Rhapsody in Swing	John Goding	Glenn Miller, "Moonlight Serenade" with lyrics by Mitchell Parish;" Ferd "Jelly Roll" Morton, "King Porter Stomp"; Jerry Gray, "String of Pearls"; Irving Berlin, "Always"; Duke Ellington, Emanuel Kurtz and Irving Mills, "In A Sentimental Mood"; and Louis Prima, "Sing, Sing, Sing"	February 19, 1997*
Rite of Spring	Trey McIntyre	Igor Stravinsky	February 23, 2005*
Rubies	George Balanchine	Igor Stravinsky	April 2, 2003
Savannah	Ntsikelelo Cekwana	Maritri Garrett, Marshall Johnson, Shana Tucker, and Ntsikelelo Cekwana	May 14, 1997*
Scenic Invitations	Choo San Goh	Wolfgang Amadeus Mozart, "Adagio and Fugue in C minor for Strings"; Ludwig van Beethoven, "Grosse Fugue in B flat, Op. 133"	February 23, 1983*
Schubert Symphony	Choo San Goh	Franz Schubert, "Symphony No. 2 in B flat"	February 20, 1985*
Scotch Symphony	George Balanchine	Felix Mendelssohn, "Symphony in A minor"	May 16, 1979
Serenade	George Balanchine	Peter Ilyich Tchaikovsky, "Serenade for Strings"	February 20, 1977
Shikar	Lynn Cote	Haskell Small, "Trio for Flute, Cello, and Piano"	November 2, 1994*
The Sleeping Beauty (Grand Pas de Deux)	Marius Pepita	Peter Ilyich Tchaikovsky, "The Sleeping Beauty"	April 24, 1981
Sonata	Krzysztof Pastor	Johannes Brahms, Violin Sonata, No. 3 in D minor, Op 108	May 19, 1999*
Sonatine	George Balanchine	Maurice Ravel	January 21, 2004
Square Dance	George Balanchine	Arcangelo Corelli and Antonio Vivaldi	October 2, 1987
State of Wonder	Septime Webre	Johann Sebastian Bach, Goldberg Variations	May 10, 2006*
Stravinsky Violin Concerto	George Balanchine	Igor Stravinsky	February 23, 2005
La Sylphide	August Bournonville	Herman Severin Løvenskiold	February 11, 2009
Sync	Nils Christe	Ludovico Einaudi, Selections from Salgari. Lyrics by Rabindranath Tagore from The Gardener	May 12, 1996*
Synonyms	Choo San Goh	Benjamin Britten, "String Quartet No. 1 in D," Movements I, II, III	May 12, 1978*
Tarantella	George Balanchine	Louis Gottschalk, "Grand Tarantelle," reconstructed and orchestrated by Hershy Kay	February 1984
Tchaikovsky Pas de Deux	George Balanchine	Peter Ilyich Tchaikovsky, ‘lost’ music for "Swan Lake"	October 9, 1981
The Reassuring Effects of Line and Poetry	Trey McIntyre	Antonín Dvořák	April 2, 2003*
The Time Before the Time After (The Time Before)	Lar Lubovitch	Igor Stravinsky, "Concertino for String Quartet"	October 16, 1986
There Where She Loved	Christopher Wheeldon	Kurt Weill and Frédéric Chopin	February 23, 2005
Time Out	Judith Jamison	Ken Hatfield	April 10, 1986*
Transcendental Etudes	Kevin McKenzie	Franz Liszt, "Transcendental Etudes" for Piano	February 12, 1992
Transit	Graham Lustig	Conlan Nancarrow: "Toccata," "Tango," and "Studies for Player Piano 2b, 3b, 3c, 3d, and 6"	February 17, 2004
Unknown Territory	Choo San Goh	Jim Jacobsen, commissioned	February 6, 1986*
Variation Serieuses	Choo San Goh	Felix Mendelssohn, "Variations Serieuses, Op. 54"	May 1, 1977*
Where the Wild Things Are	Septime Webre	Randy Woolf, commissioned	March 10, 2000
Witches of Salem	Lynn Cote, based on a libretto by Millicent Monks (the original scenario for "Grohg" was not used)	Aaron Copland, "Grohg"	May 13, 1998*
Wunderland	Edwaard Liang	Philip Glass	May 13, 2009

== Company dancers ==
As of February 2024.

=== Company ===
- Andrea Allmon
- Rafael Bejarano
- Nardia Boodoo
- Kimberly Cilento
- Nicholas Cowden
- Gilles Delellio
- Kateryna Derechyna
- Jessy Dick
- Nicole Graniero
- Ayano Kimura
- Eun Won Lee
- Lope Lim
- Ariel Martinez
- Tamako Miyazaki
- Javier Morera
- Ashley Murphy-Wilson
- Stephen Nakagawa
- Andile Ndlovu
- Maki Onuki
- Samara Rittinger
- Oscar Sanchez
- Noura Sander
- Stephanie Sorota
- Brittany Stone
- Vladimir Tapkharov

=== Studio Company ===
- Rony Baseman
- Abigail Brent
- Catherine Doherty
- Misha Glouchkova
- Andrey Marciano
- Alejandro Molina Leon
- Ethan Slocomb
- Paolo Tarini
- Harry Warshaw
- Jie-Siou Wu
