= Chan Hon Goh =

Sino-Canadian ballerina

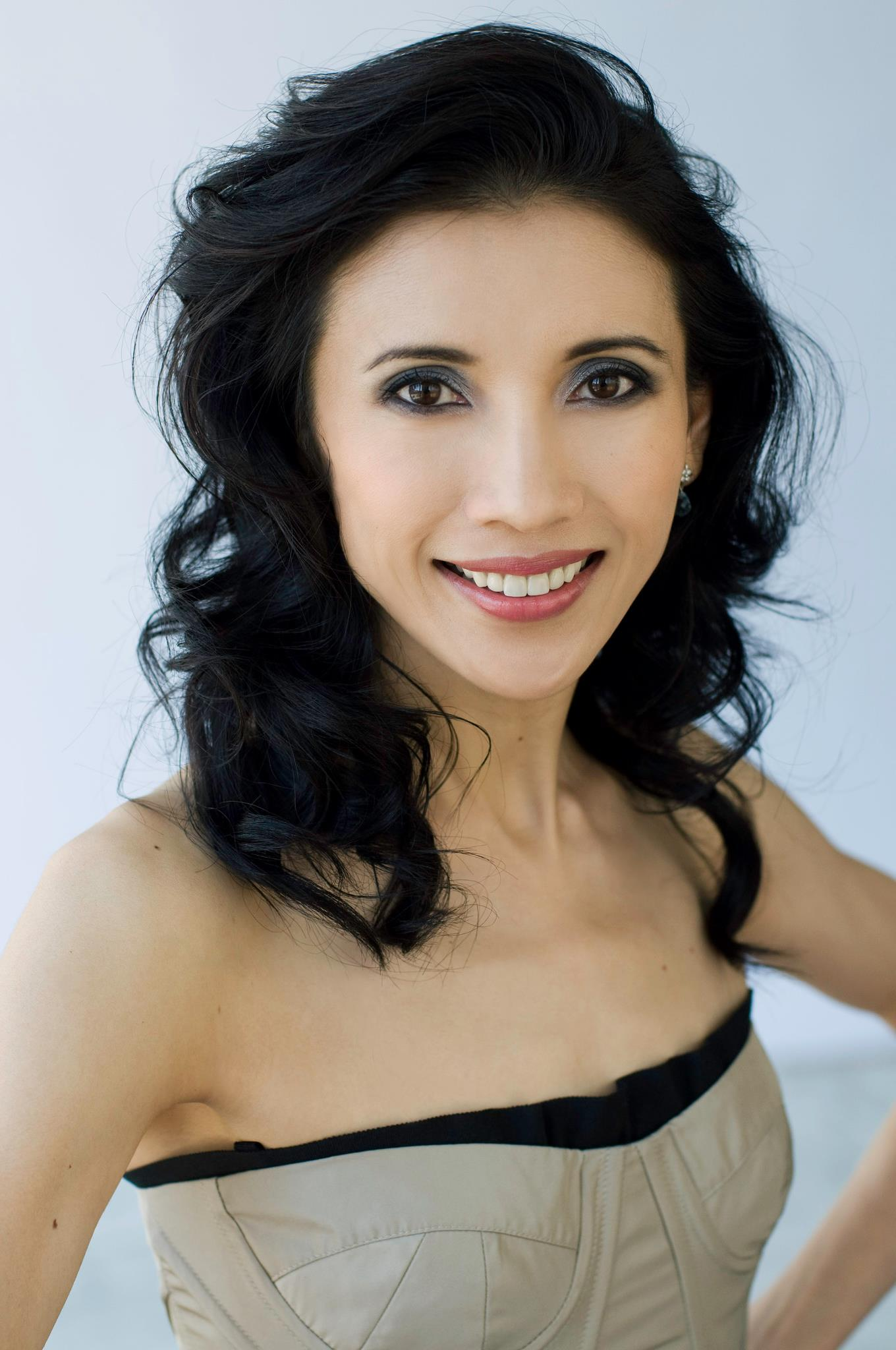
- Born: 1969 (age 56–57)
- Occupations: Published Author; Director; Dancer; Teacher; Executive Producer; Entrepreneur
- Known for: Principal Dancer
- Spouse: Chun Che
- Awards: Queen Elizabeth II Diamond Jubilee Medal; YWCA Women of Distinction Award

Chan Hon Goh, C.M (simplified Chinese: 吴振红; traditional Chinese: 吳振紅, born 1969) is a ballerina based in Canada. Goh was a principal dancer with The National Ballet of Canada before going on to become a published author, director, teacher, executive producer, and entrepreneur.

== Career ==
=== Stage career ===
Goh began her career with The National Ballet of Canada in 1988. She progressed from second soloist in 1990, to first soloist in 1992. And in 1994, Goh became the first ever Principal Dancer of Chinese heritage in the company's history.

On May 31, 2009, Chan Hon Goh danced her farewell performance at the Four Seasons Centre for the Performing Arts in Toronto, with the National Ballet of Canada.

=== Career off-stage ===
In 1996, with her husband Chun Che (also a former Principal Dancer with The National Ballet of China), Goh launched her own shoe brand "Principal by Chan Hon Goh." The company manufactures pointe shoes and dance slippers.

Goh is also a published author. In 2002, her autobiography co-written with Cary Fagan entitled Beyond the Dance: A Ballerina's Life was released by Random House. The book was a finalist for the Norma Fleck Award for Canadian Children's Non-Fiction and The Rocky Mountain Book Awards.

In 2010, Goh became the director of the Goh Ballet Academy. In 2019, she opened a second studio location in Toronto, Goh Ballet Bayview. She is also on the board of directors for the Canadian Cancer Society.

== Awards and honors ==
Goh has earned rewards, including the Queen Elizabeth II Diamond Jubilee Medal, the YWCA Women of Distinction Award, the New Pioneers Arts Award, and the Best Teacher Award at the World Ballet Competition. In 2019, Goh was appointed as a member of the Order of Canada for her skill in ballet as a principal dancer, artistic director, and cultural ambassador. Goh was recognized as the recipient of an honorary degree from the University of British Columbia for her contributions to society.

== See also ==
- National Ballet of Canada
- National Ballet of China
