= Singaporean literature =

The literature of Singapore consists of a collection of literary works by Singaporeans. It is written chiefly in the country's four official languages: English, Malay, Standard Mandarin and Tamil.

While Singaporean literary works may be considered as also belonging to the literature of their specific languages, the literature of Singapore is viewed as a distinct body of literature portraying various aspects of Singapore society and forms a significant part of the culture of Singapore. Literature in all four official languages has been translated and showcased in publications such as the literary journal Singa, which was published in the 1980s and 1990s with editors including Edwin Thumboo and Koh Buck Song, as well as in multilingual anthologies such as Rhythms: A Singaporean Millennial Anthology Of Poetry (2000), in which the poems were all translated three times each into the three languages. A number of Singaporean writers such as Tan Swie Hian and Kuo Pao Kun have contributed work in more than one language. However, such cross-linguistic fertilisation is becoming increasingly rare and it is now increasingly thought that Singapore has four sub-literatures instead of one.

Business Times (Singapore) has written that writers in Singapore can also be "highly experimental", and quoting the poet, Cyril Wong, literature in the country "doesn't necessarily mean writing that's on the page. It can be writing that is performed or even writing that is translated into video or images or photographs...including writings that are less tangible. Writings that are expressed through other mediums." Singaporean literature has even begun to make its mark on the international stage, with Sonny Liew's graphic novel The Art of Charlie Chan Hock Chye winning three Eisner Awards and the Pingprisen for Best International Comic in 2017.

== Literature in English ==
=== Poetry ===
Singaporean literature in English started with the Straits-born Chinese community in the colonial era; it is unclear which was the first work of literature in English published in Singapore, but there is evidence of Singapore literature published as early as the 1830s. The first notable Singaporean work of poetry in English is possibly Teo Poh Leng's F.M.S.R. This modernist poem was published in 1937 in London under the pseudonym of Francis P. Ng. This was followed by Wang Gungwu's Pulse in 1950.

With the independence of Singapore in 1965, a new wave of Singapore writing emerged, led by Edwin Thumboo, Arthur Yap, Robert Yeo, Goh Poh Seng, Lee Tzu Pheng, Chandran Nair and Kirpal Singh. It is telling that many critical essays on Singapore literature name Thumboo's generation, rightly or wrongly, as the first generation of Singapore writers. Poetry is the predominant mode of expression; it has a small but respectable following since independence, and most published works of Singapore writing in English have been in poetry.

There were varying levels of activity in succeeding decades, with poets in the late 1980s and early 1990s including Simon Tay, Leong Liew Geok, Koh Buck Song, Angeline Yap, Heng Siok Tian and Ho Poh Fun. In the late 1990s, poetry in English in Singapore found a new momentum with a whole new generation of poets born around or after 1965 now actively writing and publishing, not only in Singapore but also internationally. Since the late-1990s, local small presses such as firstfruits, Ethos Books and Math Paper Press have been actively promoting the works of this new wave of poets. Some of the more notable include Boey Kim Cheng, Yong Shu Hoong, Alvin Pang, Cyril Wong, Felix Cheong, Toh Hsien Min, Grace Chia, Topaz Winters, Pooja Nansi and Alfian bin Sa'at (also a playwright). The poetry of this younger generation is often politically aware, transnational and cosmopolitan, yet frequently presents their intensely focused, self-questioning and highly individualised perspectives of Singaporean life, society and culture. Some poets have been labelled confessional for their personalised writing, often dealing with intimate issues such as sexuality.

Singapore also has many overseas-based poets including Jee Leong Koh, poet, publisher, and founder of Singapore Unbound, first-generation Wong May (also a painter), Singaporean-born French Fiona Sze-Lorrain (also a fiction writer, translator, and musician). Coincidentally, all three poets have lived in the U.S. and continue to publish their work there, while May and Sze-Lorrain have since settled down in Europe.

Verse anthologies have collected and captured various aspects of life in Singapore, from the 1970s onwards, including a few anthologies under the ASEAN series for the literature of Southeast Asia. For example, the coffee table book Singapore: Places, Poems, Paintings (1993, edited by Koh Buck Song) featured poems, paintings and reminiscences about 30 significant places ranging from Chinatown to Bukit Timah Nature Reserve, and had an exhibition at the National Museum along with paintings from the book. From Boys To Men: A Literary Anthology Of National Service In Singapore (2002, edited by Koh Buck Song and Umej Bhatia) examined the meaning of military duty. Reflecting On The Merlion (2009, edited by Edwin Thumboo and Yeow Kai Chai) brought together about 40 poems about the national tourism symbol. The most authoritative anthology to date is, arguably, Writing Singapore: An Historical Anthology Of Singapore Literature (2009) edited by Angelia Poon, Philip Holden and Shirley Geok-lin Lim, and published by NUS Press.

Far from focusing solely on themes or Singaporean culture, verse anthologies have since also chosen to highlight certain aspects, stories, and writers of Singaporean literature. Among many others, UnFree Verse (second edition 2017, edited by Tse Hao Guang, Joshua Ip and Theophilius Kwek), which comprised only formal poetry and Seven Hundred Lines: A Crown of Found//Fount Sonnets (2019, edited by Desmond Kon), features 50 sonnets that form a loosely-connected lyric narrative have their focus in unifying poems with a common aesthetic form, while the anthology Exhale: An Anthology of Queer Singapore Voices (2021, edited by Ng Yi-Sheng, Stephanie Chan, Andy Ang, Ang Jin Yong, Atifa Othman and Kokila Othman) highlights queer writers in all four official languages. Verse anthologies have also served as the starting point for transnational literary relations, with anthologies such as The Second Link: An Anthology of Malaysian & Singaporean Writing (2023, edited by Daryl Lim Wei Jie, Hamid Roslan, Melizarani T. Selva, William Tham, also includes fiction) which features both Singaporean and Malaysian authors, Twin Cities (2017, edited by Tammy Ho Lai-Ming and Joshua Ip) which features both Singaporean and Hong Kong authors, and most ambitiously, The First Five: A New Collection of Southeast Asian Writing (2018, edited by Chai Wai Han) which gathers poetry and fiction from all five ASEAN nations (Indonesia, Malaysia, Philippines, Singapore and Thailand).

=== Children ===
Children's literature in Singapore has gained momentum in recent years due to increased interest in the genre generated by the First Time Writers and Illustrators Initiative which discovered acclaimed writers such as Adeline Foo (The Diary of Amos Lee), Jin Pyn (The Elephant and the Tree), Don Bosco (Thor the Greatest), Hidayah Amin (The Mango Tree), Edmund Lim (Where's Grandma) and Emily Lim (Prince Bear and Pauper Bear), Jessie Wee, one of the pioneers of children's literature, rereleased her popular Mooty Mouse series with Marshall Cavendish in 2009. David Seow is another pioneer in the genre; his Sam, Sebbie & Di-Di-Di series was first published by Educational Publishing House in 1998 and was republished by Epigram Books as the Sam, Sebbie & Di-Di-Di and Xandy series in 2013. According to the National Library Board, other prominent and prolific children's authors include Patricia Maria Tan, Chia Hearn Chek, Ho MinFong and Bessie Chua. R.S. Vern (“Haee and the other Middlings” series) first published in 2012 and won the International IndieReader Discovery Award for her debut graphic novel. Since then, she has expanded the series into short prose, poetry and even merchandise.

=== Drama ===
Drama in English found expression in Goh Poh Seng, who was also a notable poet and novelist, in Robert Yeo, author of six plays, and in Kuo Pao Kun, who also wrote in Chinese, sometimes translating his works into English. The late Kuo was a vital force in the local theatre renaissance in the 1980s and 1990s. He was the artistic director of The Substation for many years. Some of his plays, like The Coffin is Too Big for the Hole (1984) and Lao Jiu (1990), have been now considered classics.

Stella Kon gained international fame with her now-famous play Emily of Emerald Hill. About an ageing Peranakan matriarch, it has been produced in Scotland, Malaysia and Australia. The sole character has been played by men as well as women. More recent plays have tended to revolve mostly around social issues, especially causes such as gay rights. A few plays by writers such as Tan Tarn How have ventured successfully into the realm of political satire, but their audiences and critical reception remain limited.

Haresh Sharma is a playwright who has written more than fifty plays that have been staged all over the world, including Singapore, Melbourne, Glasgow, Birmingham, Cairo and London. In May 2010, his highly acclaimed play Those Who Can't, Teach was published in book form by the independent publisher Epigram Books.

Jean Tay is an economist-turned-playwright. Her play Everything but the Brain won the Best Original Script at The Straits Times' Life! Theatre Awards in 2006. Two of her plays, Everything but the Brain and Boom, were published in book form by the Singapore-based independent publisher Epigram Books.

A newer wave of playwrights have emerged included Faith Ng, Joel Tan, Lucas Ho, Nabilah Said, Helmi Yusof and Nur Sabrina Dzulkifli.

=== Fiction ===
Fiction writing in English did not start in earnest until after independence. Short stories flourished as a literary form, the novel arrived much later. Goh Poh Seng remains a pioneer in writing novels well before many of the later generation, with titles like If We Dream Too Long (1972) – widely recognised as the first true Singaporean novel – and A Dance of Moths (1995).

Beginning as a short story writer, Penang-born Catherine Lim has been Singapore's most widely read author, thanks partly to her first two books of short stories, Little Ironies: Stories of Singapore (1978) and Or Else, The Lightning God and Other Stories (1980). These two books were incorporated as texts for the GCE 'O' Levels. Lim's themes of Asian male chauvinistic gender-dominance mark her as a distant cousin to Asian-American writers such as Amy Tan. She has also been writing novels, such as The Bondmaid (1998) and Following the Wrong God Home (2001), and publishing them to an international audience since the late 1990s.

Han May is the pseudonym of Joan Hon who is better known for her non-fiction books. Her science-fiction romance Star Sapphire (1985) won a High Commendation Award from the Book Development Council of Singapore in 1986, the same year when she was also awarded a Commendation prize for her better-known book Relatively Speaking on her family and childhood memories.

Rex Shelley hails from an earlier colonial generation, although he began publishing only in the early 1990s. A Eurasian, his first novel The Shrimp People (1991) examines the regional Eurasian community and their experience in Singapore. The book won a National Book Prize. His three other novels, People of the Pear Tree (1993), Island in the Centre (1995) and River of Roses (1998) all examine similar themes of the Eurasian community in the Southeast Asia region. He has won the S.E.A. Write Award in 2007.

Su-Chen Christine Lim's works consider varied themes surrounding issues of gender, immigration and orthodoxy. In 1993, her novel, Fistful of Colours, was awarded the first Singapore Literature Prize. Her other novels take up the relationship between the Malays and Chinese immigrants in colonial Malaya, and the issue of land (A Bit of Earth).

Gopal Baratham, a neurosurgeon, started as a short story writer and later wrote politically charged works like A Candle or the Sun (1991) and Sayang (1991), which courted some controversy when they were first published.

Augustine Goh Sin Tub who began his writing career writing in Malay, burst on the literary scene after his retirement with more than a dozen books of short stories, most of which were founded on his own personal history, thus making them part fiction and part non-fiction. Works like One Singapore and its two sequels One Singapore 2 and One Singapore 3 have found fans among the different strata of Singapore society and well acclaimed by all.

Around this time, younger writers emerged. Claire Tham and Ovidia Yu wrote short stories, while playwright Stella Kon put forth her lesser-known science-fiction novel, Eston (1995). Of the younger generation, Philip Jeyaretnam has shown promise but has not published a new novel since Abraham's Promise (1995). His first two books, First Loves (1987) and Raffles Place Ragtime (1988), were best-sellers in Singapore.

Kelvin Tan, a musician and playwright, has been sporadically in sight, publishing the works All Broken Up and Dancing (1992) and the Nethe(r);R (2001). Colin Cheong can perhaps lay claim to being one of Singapore's most prolific contemporary authors, releasing three novels, one novella, two short story collections, and dozens of non-fictional works thus far. He won the Singapore Literature Prize in 1996 for his travel diary-like novel Tangerine. Daren Shiau's Heartland (1999) traces an eighteen-year-old's rites of passage from junior college through to enlistment and thereafter. The novel has been selected to be a set text at secondary school level.

Hwee Hwee Tan graduated with a First Class Honours from the University of East Anglia, and a master's from Oxford University. She grew up in Singapore and in the Netherlands, and her cosmopolitan experience can be readily seen in her novels. Her snazzy, humorous prose can be read in Foreign Bodies (1997) and Mammon Inc. (2001), both published by Penguin Books. Simon Tay, currently the chairperson of Singapore Institute of International Affairs and a former nominated Member of Parliament, has a short story collection and a novel under his belt. These are Stand Alone (1991) and City of Small Blessings (2009).

Sonny Liew, a comic artist/illustrator, won three Eisner Awards in 2017 for Best Writer/Artist, Best U.S. Edition of International Material - Asia, and Best Publication Design, for his graphic novel "The Art of Charlie Chan Hock Chye", which also won the Singapore Literature Prize in 2016. "The Art of Charlie Chan Hock Chye".

Since the late 2010s, there has been a trend of young Singaporean female novelists bringing out novels with international publishing houses based in London and New York. These novelists include Sharlene Teo, Kirstin Chen, Balli Kaur Jaswal, Jinny Koh, Clarissa Goenawan, Rachel Heng, Thea Lim, Amanda Lee Koe, Jing-Jing Lee, and Fiona Sze-Lorrain.

== List of Singaporean writers ==
The following is a non-exhaustive list of notable Singaporean writers:

- Alfian bin Sa'at, playwright, poet and fiction writer
- R.S. Vern, fiction writer, poet
- Gopal Baratham, neurosurgeon and writer
- Boey Kim Cheng, poet
- Don Bosco, writer and publisher of children's fiction books
- Kamaladevi Aravindan, Tamil fiction writer, Malayalam and Tamil playwright
- Colin Cheong, poet and novelist
- Felix Cheong, poet, fiction writer
- Christine Chia, poet
- Grace Chia, poet
- Michael Chiang, playwright
- Tania De Rozario, poet, fiction writer, and artist
- Clarissa Goenawan, novelist
- Jinny Koh, fiction writer
- Goh Poh Seng, poet and novelist
- Gwee Li Sui, a literary critic, poet and graphic artist
- Suffian Hakim, satirist and writer
- Raymond Han, novelist and teacher
- Rachel Heng, fictionist
- Heng Siok Tian, poet
- Lucas Ho, playwright
- Joshua Ip, poet
- Philip Jeyaretnam, novelist and lawyer
- Koh Buck Song, poet
- Desmond Kon, poet and publisher
- Aaron Lee, poet and lawyer
- Madeleine Lee, poet
- Russell Lee, author of popular True Singapore Ghost Stories series
- Lee Tzu Pheng, academic and poet
- Liang Wern Fook, Chinese writer and songwriter
- Sonny Liew, comic artist / graphic novelist
- Catherine Lim, novelist
- Su-Chen Christine Lim, novelist
- Shirley Lim, poet and critic
- Low Kay Hwa, novelist
- Rahul Singh, creative non-fiction writer
- Kishore Mahbubani, politics
- Aaron Maniam, poet and civil servant
- Mohamed Latiff Mohamed, poet
- Chandran Nair, poet and artist
- Pooja Nansi, poet
- Faith Ng, playwright
- Ng Yi-Sheng, poet and writer
- Nuraliah Norasid, fictionist and academic
- O Thiam Chin, fiction writer
- Alvin Pang, poet and editor
- Villayil Raman Gopala Pillai, Malayalam novelist
- Anitha Devi Pillai, academic, fiction writer, creative non-fiction writer and poet
- Dr Galyna Kogut, academic and fiction writer
- Wena Poon, writer
- Rex Shelley, novelist
- Daren Shiau, poet, novelist, environmentalist and lawyer
- Damien Sin, author of Classic Singapore Horror Stories series
- Huzir Sulaiman, playwright
- Kelvin Tan, musician, playwright and novelist
- Hwee Hwee Tan, novelist
- Joel Tan, playwright
- Paul Tan, poet and deputy chief executive of the National Arts Council
- Tan Swie Hian, poet, translator, calligrapher, and artist
- Tan Tarn How, playwright
- Jean Tay, playwright
- Simon Tay, poet and lawyer
- Teo Poh Leng, poet
- Theophilus Kwek, poet, editor and critic
- Edwin Thumboo, poet and academic, former Dean of the Arts and Social Sciences Faculty, National University of Singapore
- Jeremy Tiang, fiction writer, translator
- Toh Hsien Min, poet
- Cyril Wong, poet, fictionist, anthologist and countertenor
- Eleanor Wong, academic lawyer and playwright
- Jerrold Yam, lawyer and poet
- Arthur Yap, academic and poet
- Yeng Pway Ngon, poet, novelist and critic
- Ovidia Yu, playwright and novelist
- Robert Yeo, playwright and poet
- Yong Shu Hoong, poet
- Joyce Chng, fiction writer
- Daryl Qilin Yam, fiction writer, editor, and co-founder of the literary charity Sing Lit Station
- Marylyn Tan, poet
- Jonathan Chan, poet, translator, essayist and critic
- Leong Liew-Geok, poet and academic
- Jon Gresham, novelist and co-founder of the literary charity Sing Lit Station
- Jason Erik Lundberg, novelist and publishing editor

== Selected works ==
=== English ===
- Once the Horsemen and Other Poems - Chandran Nair (1972)
- Son of Singapore - Tan Kok Seng (1972)
- If We Dream Too Long - Goh Poh Seng (1973)
- Man of Malaysia - Tan Kok Seng (1974)
- Eye on the World - Tan Kok Seng (1975)
- After the Hard Hours, This Rain - Chandran Nair (1975)
- The Immolation - Goh Poh Seng (1977)
- Ricky Star - Lim Thean Soo (1978)
- Three Sisters of Sze - Tan Kok Seng (1979)
- Singapore Accent - Ivy Goh Nair, aka B J Wu (1980)
- Army Daze - Michael Chiang (1984)
- Ricebowl - Su-Chen Christine Lim (1984)
- Star Sapphire - Han May (1985)
- The Scholar and the Dragon - Stella Kon (1986, 2011)
- The Adventures of Holden Heng - Robert Yeo (1986, 2011)
- First Loves - Philip Jeyaretnam (1988)
- Man Snake Apple - Arthur Yap (1988)
- The Stolen Child - Colin Cheong (1989)
- The Brink of an Amen - Lee Tzu Pheng (1991)
- The Shrimp People - Rex Shelley (1991)
- A Brief History Of Toa Payoh And Other Poems - Koh Buck Song (1992)
- All Broken Up and Dancing - Kelvin Tan (1992)
- Fistful Of Colours - Su-Chen Christine Lim (1993)
- A Third Map - Edwin Thumboo (1993)
- The Sea is Never Full - Jeffery T.H. Lee (1994)
- Year of the Tiger - David Miller (2012)
- Advent - David Miller (2013)
- Bahau, the Elephant & the Ham - David Miller (2014)
- DutyBound - David Miller (2014)
- The Bondmaid - Catherine Lim (1995)
- Glass Cathedral - Andrew Koh (1995, 2011)
- Amazing, Surprising, Weird & Wonderful: Myths and Facts of Singapore- Thomas Toh (1995)
- Spider Boys - Ming Cher (1995, 2012)
- Foreign Bodies - Hwee Hwee Tan (1997)
- A Visitation of Sunlight - Aaron Lee (1997)
- Womango - Grace Chia (1998)
- The Space of City Trees - Arthur Yap (2000)
- Escape from Paradise - John & May Chu Harding (2001)
- The Worth Of Wonder - Koh Buck Song (2001)
- I Chose to Climb - Colin Tan (2001)
- I Remember May - Yim Kein Kwok (2001)
- Mammon Inc. - Hwee Hwee Tan (2001)
- the Nethe(r);R - Kelvin Tan (2001)
- Eight Plays - Huzir Sulaiman (2002)
- Below: Absence - Cyril Wong (2002)
- The Ocean Of Ambition - Koh Buck Song (2003)
- City of Rain - Alvin Pang (2003)
- Unmarked Treasure - Cyril Wong (2004/2012)
- Frottage - Yong Shu Hoong (2005)
- The Visage of Terrorism - The Hounds of Hell - James Villanueva (2004/2006)
- Tilting Our Plates to Catch the Light - Cyril Wong (2007/2012)
- The Lies That Build a Marriage - Suchen Christine Lim (2007)
- Heartlands - Koh Buck Song (2008)
- The Diary of Amos Lee - Adeline Foo (2009)
- City of Small Blessings - Simon Tay (2009)
- A World in Transit - Eric Tinsay Valles (2011)
- Haee The Cat with a Crooked Tail - R.S. Vern (2012)
- The Unconventional Life of Haee - R.S. Vern (2013)
- Haee’s Quest for the Greater Prairie - R.S. Vern (2014)
- Scribbles from the Middling Cat - R.S. Vern (2023)
- Cordelia - Grace Chia (2012)
- The Black Isle - Sandi Tan (2012)
- Sonnets from the Singlish - Joshua Ip (2013)
- Inheritance - Balli Kaur Jaswal (2013)
- Ministry of Moral Panic - Amanda Lee Koe (2013)
- The Last Lesson of Mrs de Souza - Cyril Wong (2013)
- Ten Things My Father Never Taught Me and Other Stories - Cyril Wong (2014)
- Kami and Kaze - Wena Poon (2014)
- The Adventures of Snow Fox & Sword Girl - Wena Poon (2014)
- Coastlands - Aaron Lee (2014)
- Scattered Vertebrae - Jerrold Yam (2014)
- After the Fall (dirges among ruins) - Eric Tinsay Valles (2014)
- The Art of Charlie Chan Hock Chye - Sonny Liew (2014)
- The Mind Clones Trilogy - Raymond Han (2017)
- The Lover's Inventory - Cyril Wong (2015/2018)
- Rainbirds - Clarissa Goenawan (2018)
- The Gods Will Hear Us Eventually - Jinny Koh (2018)
- Sembawang: A Novel - Kamaladevi Aravindan (author) Anitha Devi Pillai (Translator) (2020)
- The Perfect World of Miwako Sumida - Clarissa Goenawan (2020)

=== Selected anthologies ===
- Singapore: Places, Poems, Paintings - Koh, Buck Song (editor, 1993). Art & Artist Speak, Singapore. ISBN 981-00-4559-X.
- No Other City: The Ethos Anthology of Urban Poetry - Alvin Pang and Aaron Lee (editors, 2000). Ethos Books, Singapore. ISBN 981-04-2276-8
- From Boys To Men: A Literary Anthology Of National Service In Singapore - Koh, Buck Song and Bhatia, Umej (editors, 2002). Landmark Books, Singapore. ISBN 981-3065-67-2.
- Rhythms: A Singaporean Millennial Anthology Of Poetry - Singh, Kirpal et al. (editors, 2000). National Arts Council, Singapore. ISBN 9971-88-763-0.
- Reflecting On The Merlion: An Anthology Of Poems - Thumboo, Edwin & Yeow, Kai Chai (editors, 2009). National Arts Council, Singapore. ISBN 978-981-08-4300-7.
- Writing Singapore: An Historical Anthology Of Singapore Literature - Poon, Angelia; Holden, Philip & Lim, Shirley Geok-lin (editors, 2009). National University of Singapore Press, Singapore. ISBN 978-9971-69-486-9. ISBN 978-9971-69-458-6.
- Tumasik: Contemporary Writing from Singapore - Pang, Alvin (editor, 2010). Autumn Hill Books, USA. ISBN 978-098-43-0362-5.
- The Epigram Books Collection of Best New Singaporean Short Stories: Volume One - Lundberg, Jason Erik (editor, 2013). Epigram Books, Singapore. ISBN 978-981-07-6234-6.
- "Get Lucky: An Anthology of Philippine and Singapore Writings" - Contreras-Cabrera, Manuelita, Bravo-Dutt, Migs & Valles, Eric Tinsay (editors, 2015). Ethos Books, Singapore. ISBN 978-981-09-7247-9.
- "UNION : 15 Years of Drunken Boat, 50 Years of Writing From Singapore" -Alvin Pang and Ravi Shankar (editors, 2015). Ethos Books, Singapore. ISBN 978-981-09-6489-4.
- "Sg Poems 2015-2016" - Valles, Eric Tinsay, Chung, Ian, Tan Chee Lay, Chow Teck Seng, Ow Yeong Wai Kit, Azhar Ibrahim & K. Kanagalatha (editors, 2016). Ethos Books, Singapore. ISBN 978-981-11-1022-1.
- "Anima Methodi" - Kon, Desmond & Valles, Eric Tinsay (editors, 2018). Squircle Line Press, Singapore. ISBN 978-981-11-8457-4.
- "The Nature of Poetry" - Thumboo, Edwin & Valles, Eric Tinsay (editors, 2019). National Parks Board, Singapore. ISBN 978-981-14-1288-2.
- "Get Luckier: An Anthology of Philippine and Singapore Writings II" - Bravo-Dutt, Migs, Betita de Guzman, Claire, Lee, Aaron and Valles, Eric Tinsay (editors, 2022). Poetry Festival Singapore, Singapore. ISBN 978-981-18-4934-3.

=== Malay ===
- Dewi Alam Dan Burung Senja (collection of poems) - Noor SI (1986)
- Jangan Tak Ada (collection of poems) - Muhammad Ariff Ahmad (1990)
- Bunga Makna (collection of poems, 1984-1988) - Ahmad Md Tahir (1992)
- Diari Bonda (Mother's Diary) - Rohani Din (1997)
- Anugerah Buat Syamsiah (An Award for Syamsiah) - Rohani Din (2001)
- Bila Rama-Rama Patah Sayapnya (When The Butterfly Snaps Its Wings) - Mohamed Latiff Mohamed (2007)
- Suasana Senja (Evening Environment) - Masuri SN (2001)
- Petikan Rasa (Abstracts of Feelings) - Abdul Ghani Hamid (2007)
- Perjalananku (My Journey) - Mohamed Latiff Mohamed & A. Samat Ali (2008)
- Diari Hitam (Black Diary) - Mohamed Pitchay Gani Bin Mohamed Abdul Aziz(2008)
- Aku Bukan Penyair (I Am Not A Poet) - Abdul Ghani Hamid (2008)
- Kota Siluman (Siluman City) - Mohamed Pitchay Gani and Muhd Irwan Jamal (2008)
- Mail Mau Kahwin (Mail Wishes To Get Married) - Muhammad Ariff Ahmad (2008)
- Ayah Tidak Sayang Padaku Lagi (My Dad Does Not Love Me Anymore) - Rasiah Halil (2007)
- Mencari Pelangi Malam (Finding The Night Rainbow) - Ahmad Awang (2002)
- Menyongsong Pelangi (Chasing The Rainbow) - Pitchay Gani Bin Mohamed Abdul Aziz(2005)
- Tuhan Masih Sayang (God Still Loves) - A. Wahab Hamzah (2002)
- Bisik (Anthology of Malay Drama) - Teater Ekamatra (2003)
- Tiga Visi (Anthology of Malay Drama) - Perkumpulan Seni (1990)
- Puisi Luka dan Puisi Duka (Poems of Hurt and Sadness) - Suratman Markasan (2004)
- Bicararasa (Speeches of Feel) - Sarifah Yatiman (2004)
- Nota (Notes) - Abdul Ghani Hamid (1987)
- Ziarah Rindu (Visits of Reminisce) - Mohamed Latiff Mohamed (2004)
- Dari Dua Benua (From Two Ends) - Sulaiman Jeem and Muhd. Salihin Sulaiman (1999)
- XXL - Anak Muda Julung Berkeris (XXL - Young Man With a Kris) - Juffri Supa'at (1999)
- Yang Bilang - Rafaat Haji Hamzah (2007)(poem)
- RESAN : Antologi Puisi & Cerpen Sayembara Noktah Putih 2008 (RESAN : Anthology of Poetry and Short Stories of White Down Writing Festival 2008) - Mohamed Pitchay Gani Bin Mohamed Abdul Aziz and Muhammad Jailani Abu Talib (2008)
- Kasih Bunga Merah - Yazid Hussein (editor)(2008)(poem)
- Teman Siber - Yazid Hussein (editor)(2008)(short stories)
- Aku Ingin Menulis - Yazid Hussein (2008)(literary guide)
- Kumpulan Cepen Satu Macam penyakit - Yazid Hussein (2009)(short stories)
- Bisikan Nadim - Dari Skrip ke Pentas ke Naskhah - Yazid Hussein (2009)(playwright)
- Kumpulan Drama D5D - Yazid Hussein (2010) (playwright)
- Antologi Puisi Seloka Hari Berubah - Yazid Hussein, Norlila Abdul Ghani & Muhammad Hafiz Yusof (2010) (poem)
- Dongeng Utopia: Kisah Cek Yah - Yazid Hussein (2011)(novel)
- Penulis Penyusun Kalimat, Pembaca Pentafsir Amanat, Sama-Sama Meraih Manfaat Yazid Hussein (2011)(literary criticism and essay)
- Koleksi Puisi : Susur Pendekar - Muhammad Jailani Abu Talib (2011)
- Cahaya - Yazid Hussein (2012)(novel)
- Aisberg Kesimpulan (collection of poems, 1989-2012) - Ahmad Md Tahir (2013)
- Rona Wicara (collection of essay, 1989-2013) - T. Ahmad Mohamed @Ahmad Md Tahir (2016)
- Daielogy (collection of anecdotes) - Serban Putih @Ahmad Mustaqim Ahmad (2016)
- Terlena Di Salah Syurga (collection of anecdotes) - Serban Putih @Ahmad Mustaqim Ahmad (2018)
- Ketika Hati Berfatwa (collection of anecdotes) - Serban Putih @Ahmad Mustaqim Ahmad (2019)
- Cahaya Di Balik Firman (collection of poems inspired by 114 surah of Al-Quran) - Ahmad Md Tahir (2025)

=== Chinese ===
- 橡胶树 — 王润华(1997)
- 甜咸人生 — 尤今(1982)
- 众山围绕 — 刘瑞金(2001)
- 老人题材 — 蓉子(2004)

=== Tamil ===
- செம்பவாங் - கமலாதேவி அரவிந்தன் (2021)
- Cantana Kinnam - I Ulaganathan (1966)
- மனித உடம்பில் மாபெரும் சக்தி - ச. செயரமன் (1996) / Yogic Powers of the Human Body - S. Jayaraman (1996)
- திருவள்ளுவர் கண்ட உலகம் - ச. செயரமன் / The World in the Eyes of Thiruvalluvar - S. Jayaraman, 1999
- இறை நலம் - ச. செயரமன் / Spiritual Health - S. Jayaraman (2006)
- அன்பான வீடு அகிலம் புகழ் நாடு - ச. செயரமன் / Beloved Home and a World Acclaimed Nation - S. Jayaraman, 2006

== See also ==
- poetry.sg
- Asas '50
- Culture of Singapore
- Singapore Literature Prize
- LGBT topics in Singaporean literature

== Additional sources ==
- Quayum, Mohammad A., (2002)Singaporean Literature in English: A Critical Reader. Malaysia: University Putra Malaysia Press, 2002. ISBN 983-2373-50-6.
