= Jerrold Yam =

Singaporean writer and lawyer

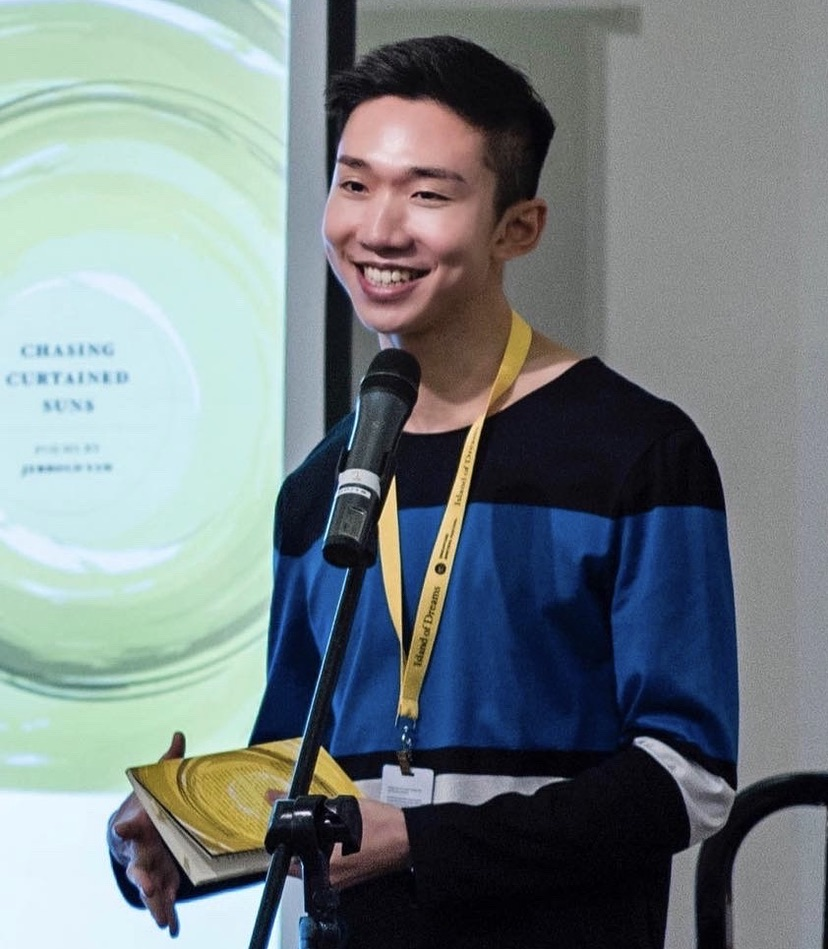
- Jerrold Yam reading at the Singapore Writers Festival.
- Education: University College London, ACS (Independent)
- Occupations: Poet, lawyer
- Writing career
- Language: English

Jerrold Yam is a Singaporean poet and lawyer whose poetry has been widely published and anthologised.

== Biography ==
Yam completed secondary education as well as the International Baccalaureate Diploma Programme at Anglo-Chinese School (Independent). He then read Law at University College London, from which he graduated with first-class honours (in addition to receiving the Dean's List award). Yam currently works as a corporate lawyer in the City of London, having qualified into "BigLaw" firm Baker McKenzie.

== Literary career ==
In 2012, Yam was nominated for the Pushcart Prize, making him then the youngest Singaporean to be nominated. His first collection of poetry, Chasing Curtained Suns, was published that same year by Math Paper Press.

Yam's poems have been published in literary journals internationally, including Poetry London, Magma Poetry, The London Magazine, The Rialto, Hayden's Ferry Review, Oxford Poetry, Prairie Schooner, Quarterly Literary Review Singapore and Washington Square Review.

His poems have also been anthologised in Lines Spark Code (Ethos Books, 2017), which is included in the Singapore A-Level literature syllabus, A Luxury We Cannot Afford (Math Paper Press, 2015), Kulit: Asian Literature for the Language Classroom (Pearson, 2014), Manoa (University of Hawaiʻi Press, 2014) and Mildly Erotic Verse (Emma Press, 2013).

He was a featured author at the Interrobang Book Fair (2013), London Book Fair (2013), Ledbury Poetry Festival (2014), SEA Arts Fest (2014) and Singapore Writers Festival (2013 to 2015), and was also an invited speaker at the Southbank Centre's Festival of Love (2014).

Yam described his debut collection Chasing Curtained Suns as being a voice for his generation, exploring the "transition from adolescence to adulthood" and "what growing up truly means in the context of modern and painfully practical Singapore". The collection "draws inspiration from National Service, celebrity culture, young love and [Singaporean localities such as] Upper Thomson Road."

He tackles similar subjects in his second and third collections, but with greater scrutiny on "[his] own weaknesses", and the "sum of [his] collected fears" in Scattered Vertebrae. The collection is "driven by psychological, emotional and physical desire, ... and [is] a genuine celebration of life’s perplexing lots." The Straits Times mentioned that "the recurring motif then, in this collection, is the dichotomy between wholeness and brokenness, and that of creation and destruction, which the title – Scattered Vertebrae – bears out beautifully."

His third collection, Intruder, explores "themes of impermanence and displacement" and the idea of home as constantly evolving. The Straits Times mentioned that "filial duties, family ties and the search for identity are the themes of Yam’s heartfelt personal poetry."

Yam's poems have been translated into Mandarin and Spanish.

In 2024, he won the Cheltenham Poetry Prize and was shortlisted for the Bridport Prize for Poetry, The London Magazine Poetry Prize and the Magma Poetry Pamphlet Prize. He was a 2024 Writer-in-Residence at the UK's National Centre for Writing, with support from the National Arts Council, Singapore.

== Works ==
=== Poetry collections ===
- Chasing Curtained Suns (Math Paper Press, 2012) ISBN 9789810721015
- Scattered Vertebrae (Math Paper Press, 2013) ISBN 9789810730604
- Intruder (Ethos Books, 2014) ISBN 9789810913724
