= Singapore Poetry Writing Month =

Annual poetry writing event in Singapore

Singapore Poetry Writing Month (SingPoWriMo) is a month-long event held in April for Singaporeans to write poetry. During SingPoWriMo, daily writing prompts are given by Singaporean poets on Facebook, and Singaporeans are encouraged to share their poetry on the platform, where they can receive feedback by the organisers and other participants. Selected poems are published in an annual anthology. Its name is inspired by NaNoWriMo, an American event that encourages people to write a novel in the month of November.

== History ==
SingPoWriMo was initiated in April 2014 by poets Joshua Ip, Alvin Pang, Pooja Nansi and Ann Ang as a private Facebook page for other Singaporean poets to share and critique poetry. However, Ip did not make the Facebook group private accidentally. By the end of the month, the group had attracted over 400 participants. The event is now organised by literary charity Sing Lit Station. In its current form, Ip has described the event as "poetry with peer pressure." A study by the Nanyang Technological University has found that the use of Singlish in SingPoWriMo poems is not well received by other poets due to its use as a comedic effect. Scholar Lee Tong King has noted that the "brand of bottom-up writing [used in SingPoWriMo] makes use of unusual forms and mixed registers to choreograph quotidian creativities, project iconoclastic sensibilities, and debunk the state's multicultural fantasy."

In 2015, a Chinese version of SingPoWriMo – 首的时间 Yishou shi de shijian (Time for One Poem) – also started on a Facebook group. In 2019, the Tamil Language Council organised a Tamil language SingPoWriMo competition that is unrelated to the Sing Lit Station organised event. In the same year, in response to poor sales of the SingPoWriMo hardcopy anthology, Sing Lit Station ceased the publication of the anthology, choosing instead to publish featured poems on an online magazine.

== Singapore Poetry on the MRT ==
In 2016, SingPoWriMo featured a poetry challenge to write poems about individual MRT stations, which led to an interactive poetry map of every MRT station of Singapore. This resulted in a poetry reading on the MRT trains named SingPoOnTheMRT. In 2017, SingPoWriMo participants were invited to recite poetry on bus 67 of the Singapore public bus system.

Sing Lit Station subsequently organised a campaign in partnership with the National Arts Council and SMRT to place more than 150 panels of poetry excerpts on 30 trains from 2024 to 2025, in order to allow poetry to "enter the mainstream on a much larger scale."
