= Pooja Nansi =

Singaporean poet, musician and educator (born 1981)

- Born: November 27, 1981
- Occupations: Poet, Musician, Educator
- Writing career
- Language: English, Malay

Pooja Nansi (born November 27, 1981) is a Singaporean poet, musician and educator.

== Biography ==
Pooja Nansi was born in Gujarat, India in 1981. Her family moved to Singapore when she was one and a half years old. She is the oldest of two daughters.

She grew up in Katong and attended Telok Kurau Primary School and CHIJ Katong Convent from 1988 - 1997. She wanted to be a teacher from a young age and would teach her dolls as a child. She attended the National University of Singapore and started teaching upon graduation.

She taught at Temasek Junior College for nine years and held the position of head of Language Arts and English Literature for part of her time there. She was a writer-in residence at Nanyang Technological University (2015-2016) and currently teaches creative writing part-time.

== Literary career ==
Pooja Nansi was first inspired to write her own poetry upon her first encounter with Sylvia Plath's poem, Daddy, in a school library. It was the first time the 13-year-old felt she was allowed to have strong feelings, such as anger, in her writing. Her creative influences include old Bollywood songs, hip-hop artists such as Drake, Kendrick Lamar and Snoop Dogg, pop music such as Britney Spears and Elton John, and poets such as Cyril Wong and Leonard Cohen. Her work is combination of poetry, music and performance. She disagrees with being defined as a performance or page poet as she believes that poetry can exist in multiple ways without the need for distinction.

While a university student, she attended Word Forward's poetry slam at Zouk, a nightclub in Singapore, and discovered slam poetry and spoken word. She met other contemporaries such as poets Marc Nair and Ng Yi-Sheng and musician Bani Haykal during this time. She published her first poetry collection, Stiletto Scars, in 2007 under Word Forward's publishing arm.

In 2009, she formed a spoken word and music duo with actress-singer, Anjana Srinivasan. They called themselves the Mango Dollies. Most of the poems she wrote in this collaboration were documented in her second collection, Love is an Empty Barstool (Math Paper Press, 2014).

In 2013, she started Speakeasy, a monthly poetry reading featuring both performance and page poets. She created the platform to bring both communities together. Speakeasy ran for five years until the host venue closed and she decided not to relocate the event.

In 2016, she received the Young Artist Award and was named Singapore's first Youth Poet Ambassador (YPA). During her YPA tenure, she conceptualised the Other Tongues Festival, a literary festival of minority voices with programmer Shridar Mani. The inaugural festival ran in December 2018.

In 2018, Nansi was announced as the new director of Singapore Writers Festival from 2019, taking over the position from poet Yeow Kai Chai. She concluded her tenure in 2023, handing over the position to poet Yong Shu Hoong.

In 2024, Nansi joined literary nonprofit Sing Lit Station and launched Afterimage, a publishing arm focused on poetry, as its inaugural chief publisher. Afterimage was created in hopes of addressing a "conspicuous gap" in the local publishing scene.

In 2024, she was conferred the title of Chevalier dans l’Ordre des Arts et des Lettres, one of France's top cultural honors by the French Ministry of Culture.

== Works ==
Poetry
Year	Title	Publisher	ISBN
2007	Stiletto Scars	Word Forward	978-981-05-9625-5
2014	Love is an Empty Barstool	Math Paper Press	978-981-07-7716-6
2021	We Make Spaces Divine	Math Paper Press	978-981-14-9145-0

Non-Fiction
Year	Title	Publisher	ISBN
2014	Local Anaesthetic: A Painless Approach to Singaporean Poetry	Ethos Books.	978-981-09-0415-9

Editorial
Year	Title	Publisher	ISBN
2014	SingPoWriMo 2014: The Anthology	Math Paper Press	978-981-09-2652-6

Performances
Year	Title	Director	Produced By	Venue	Notes
2016	You Are Here	Joel Tan	Kalaa Utsavam - Indian Festival of Arts Singapore.	Esplanade Theatres on the Bay, 18 & 19 November	
2018	Thick Beats for Good Girls	Huzir Sulaiman	Produced by Checkpoint Theatre.	Drama Centre Black Box, 5 April – 22 April.	Co-written with Jessica Bellamy.
