= Ng Yi Sheng =

Singaporean writer

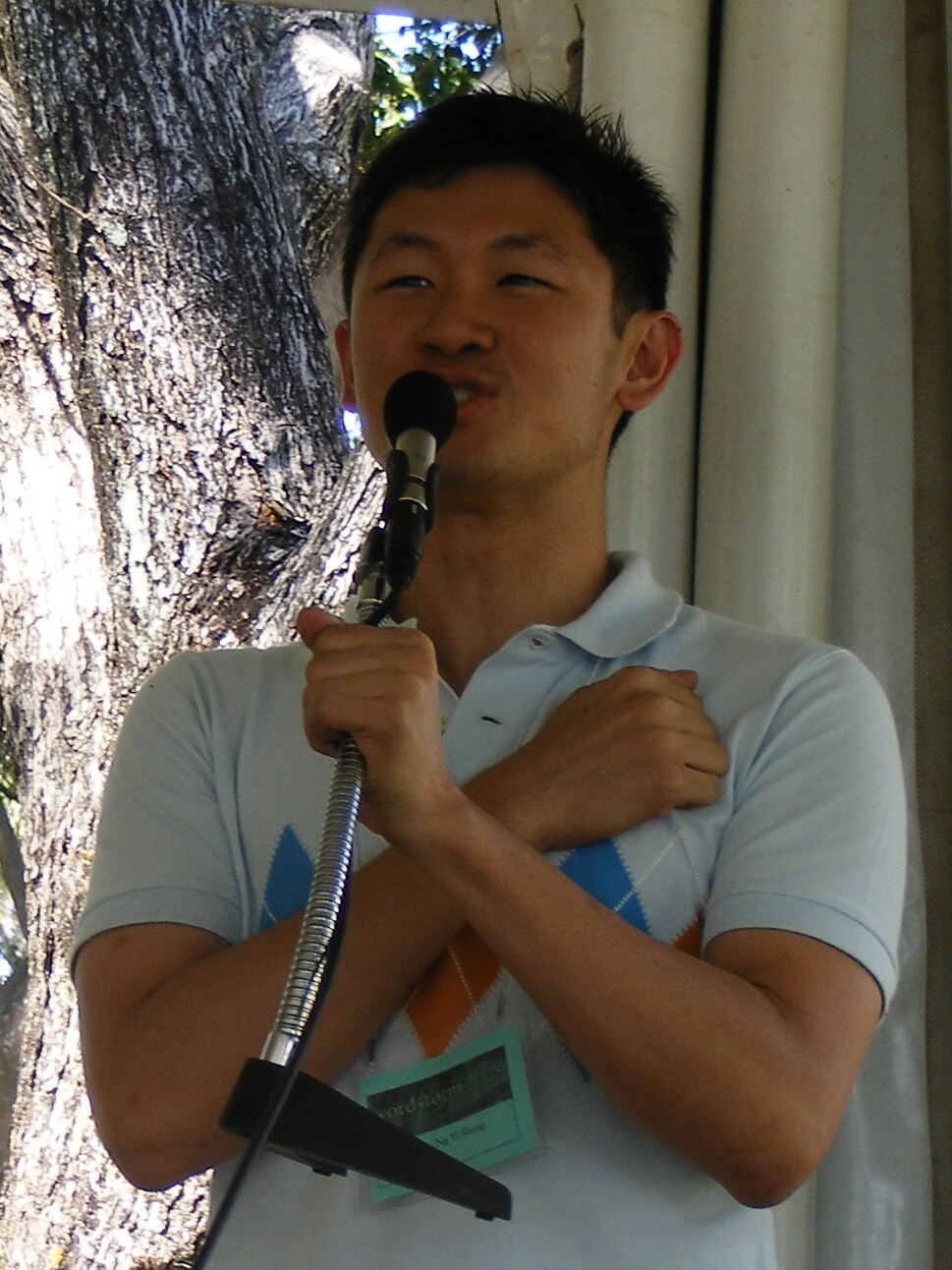
- Ng in 2008
- Born: 25 November 1980 (age 45); Singapore
- Education: Columbia University; University of East Anglia
- Occupation: Writer

Ng Yi Sheng (simplified Chinese: 黄毅圣; traditional Chinese: 黄毅聖; pinyin: Huáng Yì Shèng; born 1980) is a Singaporean writer. He has published a collection of his poems entitled last boy, which won the Singapore Literature Prize, and a documentary book on gay, lesbian and bisexual Singaporeans called SQ21: Singapore Queers in the 21st Century in 2006.

== Early life and education ==
Ng lived in Hong Kong with his parents for three years during his childhood. On his return to Singapore, he attended the Anglo-Chinese School. He graduated from Columbia University, USA, where he majored in Comparative Literature and Writing. His writing teachers at Columbia University included Louise Rose, Steve Austin, Paul Violi and Timothy Donnelly. He completed an MA in creative writing at the University of East Anglia in 2014.

Through the initiative of the Creative Arts Programme, he underwent mentorship schemes with the poets Lee Tzu Pheng and Angeline Yap, as well as worked on playwriting under Theatreworks' Greenhouse Project and The Necessary Stage's Playwright's Cove.

== Publications ==
His poems have been published in the poetry anthologies First Words, onewinged, No Other City and Love Gathers All, as well as the journals the2ndRule, Quarterly Literary Review Singapore, Softblow, Quarto, Asian Journal and Queer. In 1998, he won first prize in the NUS Poetry Competition, and in 2003, fared similarly at the Writers' Week Poetry slam.

His performed plays include Serve (The Ordinary Theatre), Snake (Stage Right), Redhill Blues (Creative Arts Alumni Programme, Republic Polytechnic), Hungry (Theatreworks, Singapore Polytechnic, Anderson Secondary School and International Islamic University, Malaysia). One of his plays formed the core of Poetic Licence, a performance poetry production by STAGES presented in 2002 and 2005.

In August 2006, he published a collection of gay, lesbian and bisexual Singaporeans' coming out stories, SQ21: Singapore Queers in the 21st Century. In October 2006, he published his first collection of poetry, Last Boy, which won the Singapore Literature Prize.

In 2007, Ng completed his work on 251, a play about the life of Singaporean porn star Annabel Chong and Georgette, a musical about the artist Georgette Chen.

In 2018, Ng published his first collection of short stories, Lion City, which won the Singapore Literature Prize in 2020. The Straits Times said: "This collection takes apart the tropes trumpeted ad infinitum about Singapore - the Lion City, gone from fishing village to having great food and a world-class airport - and reveals the magic of myth that underpins them all. The stories, with their subtle explorations of colonialism, capitalism and alienation, are delightful and discomfiting in equal measure."

In 2025, Ng published his first novel, Utama, a work of pre-colonial historical fiction retelling the story of Sang Nila Utama from the eyes of his subjects, wives and children, which The Straits Times listed as a top read of 2025.

== Performances ==
Ng performed slam poetry pieces for ContraDiction, Singapore's first gay poetry reading event held in 2005, and was a co-organiser and performer in its sequel, ContraDiction 2, in 2006.

He delivered a lecture on Western gay history during IndigNation 2006, Singapore's second gay pride season.

== Bibliography ==
Poetry

- Last Boy (Firstfruits Publications, 2006) ISBN 978-981-05-6309-7
- Loud Poems For A Very Obliging Audience (Math Paper Press, 2016) ISBN 978-981-09-8987-3
- A Book of Hims (Math Paper Press, 2017) ISBN 978-981-11-5284-9

Prose

- SQ21: Singapore Queers in the 21st Century (Oogachaga Counseling and Support, 2006) ISBN 978-981-05-6205-2
- Eating Air (Firstfruits Publications, 2006) ISBN 978-981-08-0280-6
- On His Wings: Soaring (2008) OCLC 225868100
- Lion City (Epigram, 2018) ISBN 978-981-17-0074-3
- Utama (Epigram, 2025) ISBN 978-981-53-4802-6

Plays

- 251 (2007)
- Georgette (2007)
- The Last Temptation of Stamford Raffles (2008)

Edited Anthologies

- First Words: A Selection of Works by Young Writers in Singapore (Unipress, 1996) ISBN 978-981-00-7791-4
- Onewinged: An Anthology of Young Writing (Unipress, 2001) ISBN 978-981-04-4469-3
- Roots and Wings: A Selection of Works by Writers from the Creative Arts Programme (Gifted Education Branch, Ministry of Education, 2009) ISBN 978-981-08-3193-6
- GASPP: A Gay Anthology of Singapore Poetry & Prose (Ethos Books, 2010) ISBN 978-981-08-6808-6
- Eastern Heathens: An Anthology of Subverted Asian Folklore (Ethos Books, 2013) ISBN 978-981-07-5680-2
- HEAT: A Southeast Asian Urban Anthology (Buku Fixi, 2016) ISBN 978-967-09-5436-3

Translations

- The New Village by Wong Yoon Wah (with Ho Lian Geok) (Ethos Books, 2012) ISBN 978-981-07-1598-4
