= Don Bosco (disambiguation) =

Don Bosco may refer to:

- John Bosco (Italy, 1815–1888), a Catholic priest and saint of the Roman Catholic Church and the Anglican Communion
  - Salesians of Don Bosco, a Roman Catholic religious order
  - Salesian Sisters of Don Bosco, a Roman Catholic religious order
- Don Bosco, Buenos Aires, a city in Argentina
- Don Bosco, Parañaque, a village in the Philippines
- Don Bosco (Panama Metro), a rapid transit station in Panama City, Panama
- Don Bosco FC, a club from Pétion-Ville, Haiti
- Don Bosco FC (Puerto Rico), a club from San Juan, Puerto Rico
- Don Bosco SC, a club from Negombo, Sri Lanka
- Don Bosco Jarabacoa FC, a club from Jarabacoa, Dominican Republic
- CS Don Bosco, a club from Lubumbashi, DR Congo
- DJK Don Bosco Bamberg, an association football club from Bamberg, Germany
- Don Bosco (1935 film), an Italian film directed by Goffredo Alessandrini
- Don Bosco (1988 film), an Italian film starring Ben Gazzara and Patsy Kensit
- Don Bosco (author), an author from Singapore
- Don Bosco (TV series), a Mexican telenovela
- Malvasia di Castelnuovo Don Bosco, an Italian wine

== See also ==
- Don Bosco School (disambiguation)
