= Desmond Kon =

Singaporean poet and artist

- Born: Desmond Kon Zhicheng-Mingdé; 1971 (age 54–55)
- Education: National University of Singapore, Harvard University (thM), University of Notre Dame (MFA)
- Occupations: Poet, journalist (former)
- Website: www.desmondkon.com

Desmond Kon Zhicheng-Mingdé (born 1971) is a poet, former journalist, interdisciplinary artist and founder of Squircle Line Press. He has authored ten poetry collections, an epistolary novel, and edited more than fifteen books. He has an MFA in creative writing, and is also an avid potter.

== Education ==
Born in 1971, Desmond studied sociology and mass communication at the National University of Singapore in 1995. He went on to receive his theology masters (world religions) from Harvard University in 2006 and fine arts masters (creative writing) from the University of Notre Dame in 2009. He was trained in book publishing at Stanford University in 2001.

== Literary career ==
In 2014, he won the Poetry World Cup while representing Singapore. He is the curator of the "eye feel write" ekphrastic collaboration between the Singapore Writers Festival, the Singapore Arts Museum and the National Gallery Singapore. He is also a mentor for the National Arts Council's Mentor Access Project. In 2016, he co-won the Singapore Literature Prize for English Poetry for his poetry collection, "I Didn't Know Mani Was a Conceptualist", published with Math Paper Press.

Desmond Kon’s writing has appeared in over 200 literary publications, including AGNI, Ambit, Asymptote, Harvard Review, Hayden’s Ferry Review, Jacket2, New Orleans Review, Notre Dame Review, QLRS, Seneca Review, The Massachusetts Review, The New Guard, Versal, and Voice & Verse. His other honours include the IBPA Benjamin Franklin Gold Award (Poetry), two Illumination Christian Book Gold Awards (Digital Media in consecutive years), and the PEN American Center Shorts Prize, among other accolades.

Desmond Kon is cited as the inventor of several poetic forms, including the asingbol, the anima methodi, and the found//fount sonnet.

== Selected bibliography ==
=== Poetry collections ===
- The Arbitrary Sign. 2013. Singapore: Red Wheelbarrow Books.
- I Didn’t Know Mani was a Conceptualist. 2014. Singapore: Math Paper Press.
- Sanctus Sanctus Dirgha Sanctus. 2014. Singapore: Red Wheelbarrow Books.
- The Wrong/Wrung Side of Love. 2015. USA: Glass Lyre Press; Singapore: Squircle Line Press.
- Phat Planet Cometh. 2015. USA: Glass Lyre Press; Singapore: Squircle Line Press.
- Thirty-Seven Reasons Red Is Rad. 2016. USA: Glass Lyre Press; Singapore: Squircle Line Press.
- Mirror Image Mirage. 2016. USA: Glass Lyre Press; Singapore: Squircle Line Press.
- Reading to Ted Hesburgh. 2017. USA: Glass Lyre Press; Singapore: Squircle Line Press.
- Apophenia: Forty-One Dada Dilemmas. 2017. USA: Glass Lyre Press; Singapore: Squircle Line Press.
- Heart Fiat: New Catholic Poems [Dedicated First Edition to Pope Francis]. 2024. USA: Resource Publications (Wipf & Stock imprint); Singapore: Poetry Festival Singapore.

=== Fiction ===
- Singular Acts of Endearment: A Novel. 2014. USA: Grey Sparrow Press; Singapore: Squircle Line Press.

=== Non-fiction ===
- Top Ten TCS Stars. 1995. Singapore: Caldecott Publishing.
- The Good Day I Died: The Near-Death Experience of a Harvard Divinity Student [A Quasi-Memoir]. 2019. Singapore: Penguin Random House South-east Asia.

=== Lyric essays ===
- Hermitage of Dreamers: Lyric Essays. 2018. USA: Glass Lyre Press; Singapore: Squircle Line Press.
- Found Texts of the AAI Anon, Circa 3119: Eight Lyric Essays. 2020. Photos. Karen Kon. Singapore: Ethos Books.

== Awards ==
- 2011 – PEN American Center Shorts Prize
- 2011 – Smartish Pace Erskine J. Poetry Third Prize
- 2012 – Little Red Tree Publishing International Poetry Prize
- 2014 – Poetry World Cup
- 2015 – Independent Publisher (IPPY) Silver Book Award (Multicultural Fiction
- 2015 – Living Now Bronze Book Award (Metaphysical)
- 2015 – Living Now Silver Book Award (Inspirational Fiction)
- 2015 – National Indie Excellence (NIEA) Book Award (Poetry)
- 2016 – Independent Book Publishers Association (IBPA) Benjamin Franklin Gold Award (Poetry)
- 2016 – Living Now Gold Book Award (Death & Dying)
- 2016 – Singapore Literature Prize (English Poetry) Co-Winner
- 2020 – International Poetry Studies Institute (IPSI) Poetry on the Move Meniscus Award (First Prize)
- 2022 - Living Now Gold Book Award (Digital Media) Co-Winner
- 2022 – eLit Gold Book Award (Best Book Website) Co-Winner
- 2022 – Independent Publisher (IPPY) Gold Book Award (Book/Author/Publisher Website) Co-Winner
- 2022– Illumination Christian Gold Book Award (Digital Media) Co-Winner
- 2023 - eLit Gold Book Award (Anthologies) Co-Winner
- 2023 - Illumination Christian Gold Book Award (Digital Media) Co-Winner
- 2023 - Living Now Gold Book Award (Digital Media) Co-Winner
