= Joshua Ip =

Singaporean poet and writer

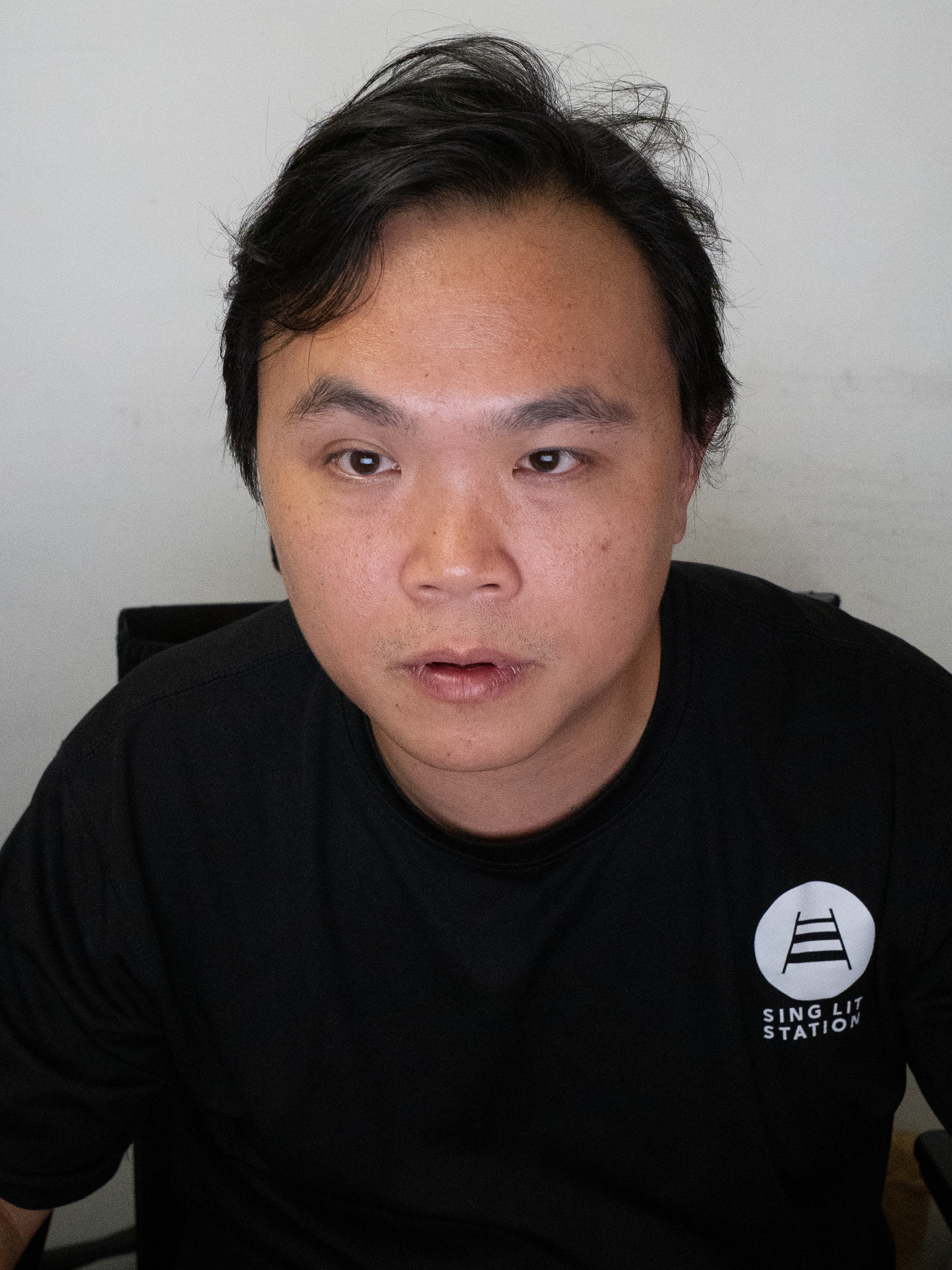
- Ip in 2025
- Born: 1982 (age 43–44); Singapore
- Education: BA (English), University of Pennsylvania
- Occupations: Poet; writer; editor

Joshua Ip (born 1982) is a Singaporean poet, and writer.

== Education ==
Joshua Ip attended Anglo-Chinese School (Independent) and Raffles Junior College before completing a degree in Creative Writing at the University of Pennsylvania. He was mentored by Lee Tzu Pheng and Heng Siok Tian.

== Works ==
Ip has published four volumes of poetry with Math Paper Press and edited nine anthologies. His first collection, "sonnets from the singlish" (Math Paper Press, 2013) co-won the Singapore Literature Prize in 2014. The collection has been referred to in The Straits Times as "a playful subversion of the form's rhythm and rhymes". Ip's work in "sonnets from the singlish" has been described as building "a distinctly contemporary Singapore slant through the formalism of his verse", and "[his] greatest strength lies in crafting these absurd scenarios, which vividly and concisely capture the gist of his philosophising." Ip's focus on formal poetry has been compared to the "freeer approach to the writing of poetry of Singapore's first generation of postcolonial poets." Of his latest collection, "footnotes on falling", Rain Taxi wrote that "Ip's work binds together the morbid curiosity of our sourest livelihoods and the relief of wordplay", and The Straits Times described the collection as "poems that work as puzzles to be decoded.".

Ip is a often-cited editor of contemporary Singapore poetry anthologies, having co-edited with Christine Chia the collection "A Luxury We Cannot Afford", a response to the 1969 pronouncement by then-PM of Singapore Lee Kuan Yew that "poetry is a luxury we cannot afford."The collection brings together "a rich variety of poems by both established figures and newly emergent voices", and "endeavors to imagine and create spaces for literature in Singapore.". More recent anthologies include "Unfree Verse" (2015), the first collection of Singaporean formal poetry spanning 80 years of history, which "represents an unprecedented attempt to plug the gap where Singaporean formal poetry is concerned", and "Call and Response"(2019), reviewed in The Straits Times as "[taking] Singapore's burgeoning migrant worker poetry scene a step further by pairing works by more than 30 migrants, the bulk of them low-wage transient workers, with poems written in response by locals." The Journal of Commonwealth Literature notes that "he has emerged as a prolific contributor to the genre... [having] either individual collections or edited volumes each year."

Ip won the Golden Point Award for Prose in 2013 for his short story, "The Man Who Turned Into a Photocopier", and was first runner-up for Poetry in 2011. He was selected as one of the National Arts Council's "New Voices of Singapore" in 2014. He was the recipient of the Young Artist Award in 2017.

== Literary activities ==
Ip founded the inaugural Singapore Poetry Writing Month in April 2014, a movement which gathered poets online to write a poem a day for 30 days. Recent editions reached an audience of 6,000 and included physical events such as MRT-based poetry readings and performance-poetry-professional-wrestling hybrid performances. He co-founded Sing Lit Station, a literary non-profit that was awarded a National Arts Council seed grant to develop writing in Singapore through literary bootcamps and workshops.

Ip has represented Singapore at international literary festivals and publishing conferences including the Griffith Review New Asia Now tour of Australia, Asia-Pacific Writers Festival in Bangkok, the Goa Literary Festival, the London Book Fair, and the New York Singapore Literature Festival. He has been a featured writer at the Singapore Writers Festival since 2012.

== Selected bibliography ==
=== Poetry ===
- sonnets from the singlish (Math Paper Press, 2012) ISBN 978-981-07-1550-2
- making love with scrabble tiles (Math Paper Press, 2013) ISBN 978-981-07-4779-4
- sonnets from the singlish upsize edition (Math Paper Press, 2015) ISBN 978-981-09-7884-6
- footnotes on falling (Math Paper Press, 2018) ISBN 978-981-11-5283-2
- Farquhar (Ethos Books, 2020) ISBN 978-981-14-2705-3
- translations to the tanglish (Math Paper Press, 2021) ISBN 978-981-18-1345-0

=== Anthologies (edited) ===
- SingPoWriMo 2014: The Anthology (Math Paper Press, 2014) ISBN 978-981-09-2652-6
- A Luxury We Cannot Afford (Math Paper Press, 2014) ISBN 978-981-09-2653-3
- SingPoWriMo 2015: The Anthology (Math Paper Press, 2015) ISBN 978-981-09-7322-3
- A Luxury We Must Afford (Math Paper Press, 2016) ISBN 978-981-09-8661-2
- SingPoWriMo 2016: The Anthology (Math Paper Press, 2016) ISBN 978-981-11-1294-2
- UnFree Verse (Ethos Books, 2017) ISBN 978-981-11-3726-6
- Twin Cities: An anthology of twin cinema from Singapore and Hong Kong (Landmark Books, 2017) ISBN 978-981-4189-81-1
- Call and Response: a migrant/local poetry anthology (Math Paper Press, 2018) ISBN 978-981-11-8919-7
- 11 x 9: Collaborative poetry from the Philippines and Singapore (Math Paper Press, 2019) ISBN 978-981-14-3000-8
- to let the light in: an anthology (Landmark Books / Asia Pacific Hospice Network, 2021)

=== Prose ===
- Peace is a Foot Reflexology Parlour, Balik Kampung 2A, 2013
- ROBOTZ ATTACKZ THE CITEH, From the Belly of the Cat, 2013
- The Man Who Turned Into a Photocopier, Golden Point Award, 2011

== Awards ==
- National Arts Council Golden Point Award (2011, 2013, 2015)
- Singapore Literature Prize – Co-winner (English Poetry), 2014
- National Arts Council Creation Grant, 2014
- Singapore Young Artist Award, 2017
