= New Asia Republic =

New Asia Republic was a Singapore-based news commentary website. Its scope of coverage included strategic, economic and socio-political issues pertaining to Singapore, as well as international affairs, encompassing the liberal-libertarian spectrum. Launched in March 2010, it was founded by Donaldson Tan and another friend.

Prior to launching New Asia Republic, Donaldson Tan was an editor at the socio-political blog The Online Citizen where he was in charge of the news desk and the foreign desk. Other notable current and former contributors include literary critic Dr Gwee Li Sui and former NTUC Income CEO Tan Kin Lian.

New Asia Republic launched its Chinese Language Section in February 2011, becoming the first bilingual news commentary website in Singapore. It provided bilingual coverage of the 2011 Singapore General Election and the 2011 Singapore Presidential Election.

The site appeared to be out of service ever since February 2014, with no posts from its official Twitter.
