= Heng Siok Tian =

Singaporean poet and educator

- Born: 1963 (age 62–63); Singapore
- Education: National University of Singapore; Nanyang Technological University
- Occupations: Writer, teacher

Heng Siok Tian (born 1963) is a Singaporean poet and educator. She has published five volumes of poetry: Crossing the Chopsticks and Other Poems (1993), My City, My Canvas (1999), Contouring (2004), Is My Body a Myth (2011) and Mixing Tongues (2011).

== Biography ==
=== Early life ===
Heng was brought up in a Teochew-speaking family. In school, she found herself reconciling her traditional Chinese upbringing with her English-based education and her study of English literature.

She received a Master of Arts in English Literature from the National University of Singapore in 1996, and a Master of Science in Information Studies from Nanyang Technological University in 2002. She began writing during her time at NUS, receiving the first prize in poetry and an honourable mention in the short story category in the 1985-1986 NUS Poetry and Short Story Writing Competition.

She continued her literary education as a Fellow with the Iowa International Writing Program at the University of Iowa, on a National Arts Council Fellowship.

=== Career ===
As an educator, Heng has been in the teaching service for over 28 years. She received the National Day Honours in 2015 for her 25-year contribution to the education system in Singapore. She is a supporter of the Creative Arts Programme (CAP), a seminar established by the Gifted Education Branch at the Ministry of Education, Singapore (MOE). Heng regularly facilitates CAP workshops, and has mentored several young writers in the CAP Mentorship attachment segment.

She is presently a media services specialist with the educational technology division of the MOE, and an English Literature teacher at Hwa Chong Junior College.

== Literary activities ==
Heng was shortlisted for the Singapore Literature Prize with her works Yin-ly (1995) and Child Passing Chamber (1997), which were then combined to form her collection My City, My Canvas (1999). Her works have also been published in various outlets such as SilverKris and The Straits Times.

In 1991, she staged her play The Lift. In 1994, it was read at the 3rd International Women's Playwrights' Conference in Adelaide, Australia.

Heng has been part of the NAC-Arts Enrichment Programme panel evaluating literary arts activities in Singapore, and was one of the judges of the poetry category for the 2015 NAC Golden Point Award.

She has been actively involved with literary festivals, having been featured in the Singapore Writers' Week in the 1980s and 1990s. She has continued to participate after it evolved into the Singapore Writers Festival in 2007, 2009 and 2011 to 2017. She has been a guest of literary events in China, Denmark, France, Malaysia, the Philippines, the US and Sweden.

== Works ==
Poetry

Title	Year	Publisher	ISBN	Notes
Crossing the Chopsticks and Other Poems	1993	UniPress	ISBN 978-981-00-4259-2	
My City, My Canvas	1999	Landmark Books	ISBN 978-981-30-6536-9	
Contouring	2004	Landmark Books	ISBN 9813065834	
Mixing Tongues	2011	Landmark Books	ISBN 978-981-41-8929-3	
Is My Body A Myth	2011	Landmark Books	ISBN 978-981-41-8928-6	
Lost Bodies: Poems between Portugal and Home	2016	Ethos Books	ISBN 978-981-11-0974-4	with Phan Ming Yen, Yong Shu Hoong and Yeow Kai Chai

Prose

Title	Year	Publisher	ISBN	Notes
Fishballs and Vermicelli	1985	ASEAN Committee on Culture and Information	ISBN 978-997-18-8089-7	published in Anthology of ASEAN Literatures: The Fiction of Singapore
Choice of Two Salads	2005	Isbn Edizioni	ISBN 978-887-63-8010-5	translated and published in Sedici Racconti Dall'Asia Estrema
The Adopted: Stories from Angkor	2015	Ethos Books	ISBN 978-981-09-4458-2	with Phan Ming Yen, Yong Shu Hoong and Yeow Kai Chai

Plays

- The Lift (1991)
