= Toh Hsien Min =

Singaporean poet (born 1975)

- Born: 1975 (age 50–51); Singapore
- Occupations: Poet and Writer

Toh Hsien Min (born 1975) is a Singaporean poet. His poems have appeared in many literary journals (e.g. London Magazine, the London Review of Books and Poetry Salzburg Review) and have been translated into Finnish, French, Spanish, Russian and Italian. He has been invited to read his poems in various international poetry festivals such as the Edinburgh International Book Festival, the Ars Interpres Poetry Festival in Sweden, the Runokuu Poetry Festival in Helsinki and the Marché de la Poésie in Paris.

His poetry has been cited in the Oxford Companion to Modern Poetry as "the work of an observant traveller and inventive formalist, adept at casual rhyme, colloquial phrasing and poignant structural returns" and in Wasafiri for an "ability to cross distances while still maintaining an ironic distance [and] the revelations with which he continuously endues us". Founder of the magazine the Quarterly Literary Review Singapore, an important online literary periodical in Singapore, Toh studied English Literature at Keble College, the University of Oxford, where he was also president of the Oxford University Poetry Society. In 2010, he won the Young Artist Award from the National Arts Council of Singapore.

== Works ==
- Iambus (1994)
- The Enclosure of Love (2001)
- Means to an End (2008)
- Dans quel sens tombent les feuilles (2016)

== See also ==
- Literature of Singapore
