= Koh Buck Song =

Singaporean writer (born 1963)

- Born: 1963 (age 62–63)

Chinese name
- Traditional Chinese: 許木松
- Simplified Chinese: 许木松
- Hanyu Pinyin: Xǔ Mùsōng
- Teochew Peng'im: Kou^{2} Bhag^{8}-song^{5}

Koh Buck Song (Chinese: 许木松; born 1963) is a Singaporean writer, poet, and country brand adviser. He is the author and editor of more than 40 books, including nine books of poetry and haiga art. He works as a writer, editor and consultant in branding, communications strategy and corporate social responsibility in Singapore. He has held several exhibitions as a Singaporean pioneer of haiga art, developed from a 16th-century Japanese art form combining ink sketches with haiku poems.

In 2023, his book Brand Singapore: Nation Branding in a World Disrupted by Covid-19 (2021) was longlisted by the Singapore University of Social Sciences for the Alan Chan Spirit of Singapore Book Prize, while his book One United People: Essays from the People Sector on Singapore's Journey of Racial Harmony (2022) was shortlisted for best non-fiction by the Singapore Book Publishers Association.

== Journalism career ==
Koh was with The Straits Times from 1988 to 1999, where he was literary editor, political supervisor and chief Parliament commentator, arts and features supervisor, and assistant editor of Sunday Review, a weekly world affairs section. His regular personal opinion column, Monday with Koh Buck Song, ran for almost a decade.

From 2003 to 2004, he was a contributing columnist on current affairs based in the USA for the Singapore newspaper Today. From 2004 to 2005, he was a regular columnist on leadership for The Straits Times.

== Literary career ==
Koh has edited several literary anthologies, and was the English section Editor, and then General Editor, of the multilingual literary and arts journal Singa in the 1990s.

In 1992, he was poet-in-residence at the Scottish Poetry Library in Edinburgh under the Singapore-Scotland Cultural Exchange programme. He has also represented Singapore at literary conferences including at Cambridge University (UK) and Manila, and in poetry readings at Harvard University and Massachusetts Institute of Technology in the USA.

As a haiga artist with several exhibitions in Singapore and Laos, his art builds on earlier work exploring the synergy between poetry and painting, especially in collaborations with the abstract artist Thomas Yeo and the watercolourist Ong Kim Seng. He was the National Gallery Singapore's poet-in-residence 2021-22, the Gallery's third after Edwin Thumboo and Madeleine Lee, with poems and haiga artworks from his residency published by the Gallery in the book the world anew.

== Country branding career ==
As a country brand adviser, Koh has spoken extensively on brand Singapore overseas, including as keynote speaker at a City Nation Place global conference in London, UK; at the Royal Institute for Governance and Strategic Studies in Phuentsholing, Bhutan; at a Pacific Economic Cooperation Council seminar in Tahiti; at the Japan Foundation in Tokyo as a cultural leader of Singapore; and the Blavatnik School of Government at Oxford University, UK.

He was on the Marketing Advisory Panel for Singapore's country brand, "Passion Made Possible". In the 2000s, he was head of global media relations and strategic planning at the Singapore Economic Development Board. As a brand consultant, his projects include the global launches of Gardens by the Bay, National Gallery Singapore, and Fusionopolis.

He wrote the first book on Singapore's country brand, Brand Singapore (2011, translated into Chinese and published in China in 2012, with a third edition in 2021). Another of his books that has a place branding theme is Around The World In 68 Days: Observations Of Life From A Journey Across 13 Countries (2021).

At the Lee Kuan Yew School of Public Policy, he is on the Executive Education teaching faculty for nation branding, having previously been an adjunct associate professor of leadership.

== Public service ==
His public service has included being Deputy Chairman of the Censorship Review Committee 2009–10, and also a member of the Censorship Review Committees of 1991–92 and 2002–03, the only person to have served on all three panels.

== Selected works ==
- Koh, Buck Song (1992). A brief history of Toa Payoh and other poems. Singapore: Imperial Pub. House. ISBN 981-00-3426-1. OCLC 29271297.
- Koh, Buck Song (text and poetry editor, with introduction, 1993). Singapore: Places, Poems, Paintings. ISBN 981-00-4559-X.
- Koh, Buck Song (1994), Thumboo, Edwin Nadason (1933– ), in Hamilton, Ian, ed., The Oxford Companion to Twentieth-century Poetry in English, Oxford University Press. ISBN 978-0-19-866147-4.
- Koh, Buck Song (editor, with Ban, Kah Choon et al., 1995). Voices 4 – Readings By Singapore Writers. National University of Singapore. ISBN 981-00-4745-2.
- Koh, Buck Song (2000). Toa Payoh: Our Kind Of Neighbourhood. Housing and Development Board, Singapore. ISBN 981-232-124-1.
- Koh, Buck Song (2001). The Worth Of Wonder. ISBN 981-232-180-2.
- Koh, Buck Song (editor, 2002). Heart Work: Stories Of How EDB Steered The Singapore Economy From 1961 Into The 21st Century. ISBN 981-04-6906-3.
- Koh, Buck Song (editor, with Bhatia, Umej, 2002). From Boys To Men: A Literary Anthology Of National Service In Singapore. ISBN 981-3065-67-2.
- Koh, Buck Song (2003). The Ocean Of Ambition. ISBN 981-248-020-X.
- Koh, Buck Song (2005). How Not To Make Money: Inside Stories From Singapore's Commercial Affairs Department. ISBN 981-05-4384-0.
- Koh, Buck Song (2008). Heartlands: Home And Nation In The Art Of Ong Kim Seng. ISBN 978-981-08-1618-6.
- Koh, Buck Song (editor, 2011). Heart Work 2: EDB And Partners: New Frontiers For The Singapore Economy. ISBN 978-981-4342-01-8.
- Koh, Buck Song (2011). Living With The End In Mind: A Study Of How To Increase The Quality Of Death In Singapore – Perspectives Of 30 Leaders, Lien Foundation.
- Koh, Buck Song (2011). Brand Singapore: How Nation Branding Built Asia's Leading Global City. ISBN 978-981-4328-15-9.
- Koh, Buck Song (2012). Perpetual Spring: Singapore's Gardens By The Bay. ISBN 978-981-4398-18-3 (hardcover). ISBN 978-981-2618-47-4 (paperback).
- Koh, Buck Song (2014). Learning For Life: Singapore’s Investment In Lifelong Learning Since The 1950s. ISBN 978-981-09-1776-0.
- Koh, Buck Song (2016). Our Guardians: Keeping Singapore Safe And Secure Since The 1950s. ISBN 978-981-46-4242-2.
- Koh, Buck Song (2016). Inspiring lifelong learning: the MDIS story. ISBN 978-981-09-8428-1.
- Koh, Buck Song (second edition, 2017). Brand Singapore: Nation Branding After Lee Kuan Yew, In A Divisive World. ISBN 978-981-4779-24-1.
- Koh, Buck Song (editor, 2018). Making Cities Liveable: Insights From 10 Years Of Lectures At The Centre for Liveable Cities. ISBN 978-981-1176-39-5.
- Koh, Buck Song (third edition, 2021). Brand Singapore: Nation Branding In A World Disrupted by Covid-19. ISBN 978-981-4928-38-0
- Koh, Buck Song (2021). Around The World In 68 Days: Observations Of Life From A Journey Across 13 Countries. ISBN 978-9-814-88223-1
- Koh, Buck Song (editor, 2022). "One United People": Essays From The People Sector On Singapore's Journey Of Racial Harmony. ISBN 978-981-5009-62-0
- Koh, Buck Song (2023). The world anew : poetry and haiga inspired by art in pandemic times. National Gallery Singapore. Singapore. ISBN 978-981-18-6245-8. OCLC 1354374665.

== Selected works in anthologies & other books ==
- Sionil Jose, Francisco (1991). New Voices In Southeast Asia. Solidarity, Manila, Philippines.
- Singh, Kirpal (editor, et al. 2000). Rhythms: A Singaporean Millennial Anthology Of Poetry. National Arts Council, Singapore. ISBN 9971-88-763-0.
- ASEAN Committee on Culture and Information (2000). Modern Literature of ASEAN.
- Edwin Thumboo & Yeow, Kai Chai (editors, 2009). Reflecting On The Merlion: An Anthology Of Poems. National Arts Council, Singapore. ISBN 978-981-08-4300-7.
- Poon, Angelia; Holden, Philip & Lim, Shirley Geok-lin (editors, 2009). Writing Singapore: An Historical Anthology Of Singapore Literature. National University of Singapore Press, Singapore. ISBN 978-9971-69-486-9. ISBN 978-9971-69-458-6.
- Gwee Li Sui, (editor, 2016). Written Country: The History of Singapore through Literature. ISBN 978-981-4189-66-8.
- Essay: "Tommy Koh on the Censorship Review Committee 1991-92", in Yeo, Lay Hwee et al (editors, 2018). Tommy Koh: Serving Singapore And The World. ISBN 978-981-3222-38-0
- Essay: "The English language in Singapore: Lens and Launchpad to the World", in Tommy Koh & Wightman, Scott (editors, 2019). 200 Years Of Singapore And The United Kingdom. ISBN 978-981-4827-17-1
- Essay: "America - The Top 'Soft Superpower'", in Tommy Koh & Singh, Daljit (editors, 2021). America: A Singapore Perspective. ISBN 978-981-4827-34-8

== Selected haiga art exhibitions & talks ==
- "Six Views Of Japan And Singapore". Super Japan Festival of Japanese Arts. The Esplanade – Theatres on the Bay. May 2016.
- "Refleksi: A Pantun Art Exhibition (using the Malay poetic form pantun). National Poetry Festival. LASALLE College of the Arts. August 2016.
- "Between Japan And Singapore: Haiga And Its Modern Legacy". Singapore Writers Festival. The Arts House at the Old Parliament. November 2016.
- "ASEAN@50 Haiga: Vientiane 2017". ASEAN Insurance Council. Vientiane, Laos. November 2017.
