= Teo Poh Leng =

Malayan poet and teacher (1912–1942)

- Born: 1912; Straits Settlements (present-day Singapore)
- Died: 28 February 1942 (aged 30); Syonan, Empire of Japan (present-day Singapore)
- Occupations: Writer; teacher
- Writing career
- Pen name: Ng, Francis P.

Teo Poh Leng (1912 – 28 February 1942) was a Malayan poet and teacher who lived in Singapore, the then capital of the Straits Settlements. He was noted for having the first book-length publication in English by a person from Singapore. Teo Poh Leng was a victim of the Sook Ching massacre during the Japanese occupation of Singapore and died on February 28, 1942.

== Biography ==
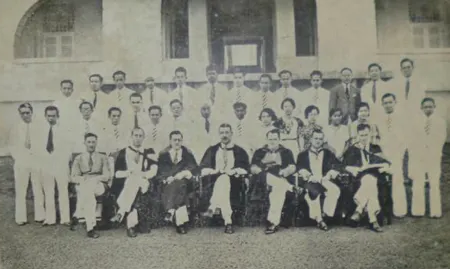
Photo of graduates from Raffles College, 1934. Teo is in the photo but is unidentifiable as no other photos of him have been found.

Teo Poh Leng was born in 1912, the youngest son of a Teochew family. He studied at St Joseph's Institution, and received a Liberal Arts degree in 1934 from Raffles College. Whilst at Raffles College, he was the editor of Raffles College Magazine, and wrote many commentaries on the state of modern Malaya. He became an elementary school teacher upon completing his studies. His brother Teo Kah Leng was also a poet and teacher, and was later principal of Montfort School.

During his working life, he was active in politics and his Catholic community. He was a member of the Straits Chinese British Association (SCBA), and also served as Vice President of the Catholic Young Men's Association (CYMA) of the Church of Our Lady of Lourdes. He was the honorary librarian of the CYMA of the Church of Sts. Peters and Paul, and served as a special correspondent for Malaya Catholic Leader, a weekly newspaper. He died in the Sook Ching massacre on February 28, 1942, during the Japanese occupation of Singapore during World War II.

== Works ==
Teo published poetry in The London Mercury and Life and Letters Today, prominent literary magazines of the 1930s based in England. He also submitted work unsuccessfully to the American poet Harriet Monroe for publication in Chicago.

Teo's sole full-length published work, F.M.S.R. A Poem, was published in the UK by the publisher Arthur Henry Stockwell under the pen name "Francis P. Ng", derived from Teo's second Christian name and his mother's family name. The book-length poem describes a nine-hour train journey on the Federated Malay States Railways, in the style of Western literary modernism, and is the first book-length publication in English by a person from Singapore. His work shows the influences of T.S. Eliot's The Waste Land. This influence may have stemmed from the Cornish modernist poet Ronald Bottrall, who was Teo's professor at Raffles College.

F.M.S.R. is written in free verse, but contains irregular metric lines with elements of rhyme. The first lines of the poem begin:

Millionaires from the New World with nothing else to do
Wander the Old World like wandering Jews;
Call here to buy wooden shoes.

It is unique for being set entirely in Malaya, but incorporating the tropes of 1930s Western modernism and symbolism.

== Rediscovery ==
Teo's work came to public attention again in 2015, upon the publication of a book Finding Francis: A Poetic Adventure by Ethos Books, edited by literary academic Dr Eriko Ogihara-Schuck and the poet's niece, Anne Teo. The book describes the product of two years of literary sleuthing by Dr Ogihara-Schuck to find the author of F.M.S.R. Teo had received acclaim for his work from contemporary British poets such as Sylvia Townsend Warner, but had not published work after the 1930s. An article about Ogihara-Schuck's search for Francis P. Ng in The Straits Times led her to find Teo's real identity, and connected her with the family.
