= Suchen Christine Lim =

Singaporean writer

- Born: 15 July 1948 (age 78); Ipoh, Federation of Malaya (now Malaysia)
- Occupation: Author
- Writing career
- Genre: Fiction
- Notable works: Fistful of Colours (1992); The Lies that Build a Marriage: Stories of the Unsung, Unsaid and Uncelebrated in Singapore(2007)
- Notable awards: 1986: Merit Prize, NUS-Shell Short Play Competition; 1992: Inaugural Singapore Literature Prize; 2012: S.E.A. Write Award; 2023: Cultural Medallion

Suchen Christine Lim (born 15 July 1948) is a Malaysian-born Singaporean writer. She was the inaugural winner of the Singapore Literature Prize in 1992. She was awarded Singapore's pinnacle arts award, the Cultural Medallion, in 2023.

== Early life ==
Lim was born in Ipoh, Federation of Malaya and had her early education at the Convent of the Holy Infant Jesus (CHIJ) in Penang and Kedah. At the age of 14 she came to Singapore, and continued her education at CHIJ Katong. She read literature at the National University of Singapore, and graduated with a post-graduate diploma in applied linguistics.

== Teaching career ==
After her graduation, Lim joined the Ministry of Education as a literature teacher and a curriculum specialist. She devoted her time between family, work and writing throughout her years with the ministry.

Lim retired from the Ministry of Education in August 2003, to devote her time to writing. That devotion subsequently bore fruit in the novels published as Hua Song: Stories of the Chinese Diaspora (2005) and The Lies that Build a Marriage: Stories of the Unsung, Unsaid and Uncelebrated in Singapore (2007).

== Literary works ==
Lim's first story "The Valley of Golden Showers" was written in 1979 for a children's story competition. A year later, Lim entered another writing competition sponsored by the National Book Council, winning second place. These competitions sparked her interest in becoming a writer.

Lim's first novel Rice Bowl was published in 1984, and she co-wrote the award-winning short play The Amah: A Portrait in Black And White in 1986. Her second novel Gift From The Gods (1990) was nominated for a National Book Development Council award in 1992. In that same year, Lim won the inaugural Singapore Literature Prize for her third novel Fistful of Colours (1992). A Bit of Earth (2000) was nominated for the Singapore Literature Prize in 2004. In 1996 she was given a Fulbright Grant to attend the Iowa Writers' Workshop, and returned to the university as writer-in-residence in 2000. This residency honour was also extended to her at the University of Western Australia in Perth, the Moniack Mhor Writers' Centre in the Scottish Highlands and Ateneo de Manila University in the Philippines.

In 2015, The Straits Times' Akshita Nanda selected Fistful of Colours as one of 10 classic Singapore novels. She wrote, "The gorgeously detailed A Fistful of Colours by Suchen Christine Lim covers art and women's fight for equal rights over 80 years of Singapore history. The winner of the first Singapore Literature Prize in 1992, it is a fist to the gut with its relentless portrayal of female struggles for power in a patriarchal society that strips women of any right to their sexuality or dignity."

== Works ==
=== Novels ===
- Dearest Intimate (2022, Marshall Cavendish Editions) ISBN 9789815044348
- The River's Song (2014, Aurora Metro Press) ISBN 1906582440
- A Bit of Earth (2001, Times Books International; 2009, Marshall Cavendish Editions) ISBN 9789812618955
- Fistful of Colours (1992, EPB Publishers; 2003, SNP Editions) ISBN 9789812480125
- Gift from the Gods (1990, G. Brash) ISBN 9971492229
- Rice Bowl (1984, Times Books International; 2009, Marshall Cavendish Editions) ISBN 9971651513 ISBN 9789812618962

=== Short stories ===
- The Man Who Wore His Wife's Sarong: Stories of the Unsung, Unsaid and Uncelebrated in Singapore (2017, Monsoon Books) ISBN 9781912049080
- The Lies that Build a Marriage: Stories of the Unsung, Unsaid and Uncelebrated in Singapore (2007, Monsoon Books) ISBN 9789810587130

=== Non-fiction ===
- Hua Song: Stories of the Chinese Diaspora (2005, Long River Press) ISBN 9781592650439

=== Children's ===
- Fried Eggs (2014, Ethos Books) ISBN 9789810794026
- I Don't Want to Dance (2011, Ethos Books) ISBN 9789810834777
- Miss Missy Mynah (2011, Ethos Books) ISBN 9789810881658
- My New Monster Truck (2009, Ethos Books) ISBN 9789810825522
- The Hare and the Tortoise (1992, Manhattan Press) ISBN 9813001844
- The River People (1992, Manhattan Press) ISBN 9812150269
- The Biggest Hongbao in the Whole Wide World (1991, EPB Publishers; 2009, EPB Pan Pacific) ISBN 9971055910 ISBN 9789812804761
- Cheep Cheep Cheep (1990, EPB Publishers, 2009, EPB Pan Pacific) ISBN 9971055740 ISBN 9789812804631
- Granny (1991, EPB Publishers; 2009, EPB Pan Pacific) ISBN 9971055996 ISBN 9789812804792
- Grandpa the Collector (1991, EPB Publishers; 2009, EPB Pan Pacific) ISBN 9971055988 ISBN 9789812804822
- Nanny Nanny Poo Poo (1991, EPB Publishers; 2009, EPB Pan Pacific) ISBN 9971056003 ISBN 9789812804754
- Mano Made A Promise (1991, EPB Publishers; 2009, EPB Pan Pacific) ISBN 9971055929 ISBN 9789812804617
- Roti Prata (1991, EPB Publishers; 2009, EPB Pan Pacific) ISBN 997105597X ISBN 9789812804839
- Woo Won Ton (1991, EPB Publishers; 2009, EPB Pan Pacific) ISBN 9971056046 ISBN 9789812804709
- When My Baby Sister Came Home (1990, EPB Publishers) ISBN 9971055880
- Ants in a Hurry (1990, EPB Publishers) ISBN 9971055767
- Julius Fatball and the Alley Cats (1990, EPB Publishers; 2009, EPB Pan Pacific) ISBN 997105583X ISBN 9789812804648
- The Hatching (1990, EPB Publishers) ISBN 9971055759
- The Valley of Golden Showers (1979, Educational Publications Bureau)

=== Others ===
- "Mei Kwei, I love you" in The Women Writers Handbook, Aurora Metro Books, ISBN 978-1-912430-34-5 (2020)
- The Amah: a Portrait in Black and White (1986, short play)

== See also ==
- Literature of Singapore
