= Gwee Li Sui =

Writer in Singapore

Gwee Li Sui (Chinese: 魏俐瑞; pinyin: Wèi Lìruì; Pe̍h-ōe-jī: Gūi Līsūi; Korean: 위리서; born 22 August 1970) is a Singaporean writer. His works include poetry, comics, non-fiction, and translation. He wrote Myth of the Stone, a graphic novel in English. He is also the author of Spiaking Singlish, a book on Singlish written entirely in Singlish.

== Education ==
Gwee went to the now-defunct MacRitchie Primary School and then Anglo-Chinese Secondary School and Anglo-Chinese Junior College. In 1995, he graduated from the National University of Singapore with a First-Class Honours degree in English literature and was awarded the NUS Society Gold Medal for Best Student in English. His Honours thesis was on Günter Grass's novel The Tin Drum (German: Die Blechtrommel). His Master's thesis was on Hermann Broch's novel The Death of Virgil (German: Der Tod des Vergil). Gwee pursued his doctoral research on the period from the English Enlightenment to early German Romanticism at Queen Mary, University of London. His thesis was on the discursive influence of Newtonianism on the poetry of Richard Blackmore, Alexander Pope, and Novalis.

== Academic career ==
From 2003 to 2009, Gwee was an assistant professor at the National University of Singapore Department of English Language and Literature.

== Literary career ==
Gwee has been a full-time writer since leaving academia, with over 20 books to date. A popular speaker, he continues to instruct at various universities and institutions. He is sought for his opinions on literature, language, and religion and has been on the evaluation panel for several top literary awards in Singapore, Southeast Asia, and East Asia. In 2010, he was an international writer- and critic-in-residence at the Toji Cultural Centre in South Korea.

From 2008 to 2011, Gwee hosted public interviews with Singaporean cultural figures at the independent bookstore BooksActually. From 2013 to 2017, he ran The Arts House's "Sing Lit 101: How to Read a Singaporean Poem" and gave 5 seasons of public lectures on important Singaporean poems. From 2018 to 2022, he led the National Library Board's "How to Fall in Love with Classics" series for 10 seasons, focusing on literary classics in different mediums and genres. He also fronted Yahoo! Singapore's flagship TV programme "Singlish with Uncle Gwee" for 4 seasons from 2018 to 2020.

== Works ==
Gwee wrote and illustrated Singapore’s first long-form graphic novel in English Myth of the Stone, published in 1993. Earlier such collections had involved short comic stories. Myth of the Stone is part-children's story, part-fantasy, and part-allegory and follows a boy's adventures in a realm of mismatched mythical creatures. A 20th-anniversary edition, with 2 new stories among its bonuses, was published by Epigram Books in 2013.

Gwee's poetry is known for its versatility and involves a wide range of styles and moods. His first verse collection is the well-loved Who Wants to Buy a Book of Poems?, published in 1998. It is full of linguistic play, Singlish rhymes, and jabs at Singapore's social history and culture. The 2015 expanded edition Who Wants to Buy an Expanded Edition of a Book of Poems? contains all the poems excluded from the first edition. The Straits Times named it one of the 50 greatest works of Singaporean literature in 2021.

Gwee's second verse collection is an extremely well-received volume of love poems titled One Thousand and One Nights. Poet Cyril Wong calls it "shockingly tender, even heartbreaking" while theatre director Alvin Tan praises "[his] impeccable measurement of emotion, surprising use of words and relentless clarity of thought". Gwee returned to humour poetry with The Other Merlion and Friends in 2015 before releasing a dark, meditative collection titled Death Wish in 2017. With Haikuku (2017) and This Floating World (2021), he brought together nearly 600 haikus written over a decade.

Gwee also famously writes on and in Singlish. In 2017, He published Spiaking Singlish: A Companion to How Singaporeans Communicate, which is hailed by pioneering Singlish writer Sylvia Toh as "the definitive book on Singlish". In 2019, he translated Antoine de Saint-Exupéry's The Little Prince into Singlish, making The Leeter Tunku the first literary classic in Singlish. His subsequent translations include Beatrix Potter's The Tale of Peter Rabbit, selected Brothers Grimm's Children's and Household Tales, and A. A. Milne's Winnie-the-Pooh.

As an editor, Gwee first worked on one of two seminal volumes on Singaporean and Malaysian literature in English Sharing Borders: Studies in Contemporary Singaporean-Malaysian Literature, published in 2009. His introduction exposes the problems of ideology that continue to plague the countries' literature in the name of postcolonial studies. In 2010, he edited the popular fiction collection Telltale: Eleven Stories, which was adopted as a Literature O-Level text.

In 2011, Gwee's human rights-based anthology Man/Born/Free: Writings on the Human Spirit from Singapore pays tribute to the life of Nelson Mandela and was launched in Cape Town, South Africa. In 2015, he edited the massive, two-volume Singathology: 50 New Works by Celebrated Singaporean Writers, a commemoration of Singapore's golden jubilee.

== Public life ==
Since leaving academia, Gwee has been one of few outspoken literary voices on a range of subject matters in Singapore. In 2009, during the AWARE Saga, on Facebook he called on fellow Christians not to support covert action. The AWARE saga was an event in Singapore's feminist, human rights, and LGBT history that involved the leadership of the Association of Women for Action and Research. Gwee objected to the imposing of any group's religious beliefs on a secular organisation and warned against its implications on Christian witness.

In 2014, when the National Library Board announced the pulping of three children's books following a user's complaint of their LGBT themes, Gwee – with fellow writers Adrian Tan, Prem Anand, and Felix Cheong – cancelled their library event on writing humour. Gwee also called off his keynote speech at a National Schools Literature Festival that weekend. Two of the affected books were eventually moved to the adults' section.

Also in 2014, Gwee was among the Singapore Literature Prize's English poetry judges when poet Grace Chia accused the prize of sexism after her collection Cordelia did not win. Gwee said "All entries have an equal chance of consideration for winning, and we discussed it based on that point alone, and on the strengths of the collections." The other judges were poets Leong Liew Geok and Boey Kim Cheng. Gwee wrote the preface to Cordelia.

In 2016 Gwee wrote an editorial in The New York Times on the growth of Singlish through the decades. The Press Secretary of the Prime Minister of Singapore responded to it with a statement that sparked a month-long national debate. The statement said that Gwee had "[made] light of the government’s efforts to promote the mastery of standard English by Singaporeans".

In 2020, days before the COVID-19 pandemic was declared, Irish singer Ronan Keating made a misleading social media post about ships not docking in Singapore due to the coronavirus. Gwee's comment "You say it best when you say nothing at all" – referencing words from Keating's hit song – went viral. The post was swiftly taken down.

In 2024, Gwee was among those disapproving of the installation of two colonial statues at Singapore's historic Fort Canning Hill. The statues were of East India Company official Sir Stamford Raffles and botanist Nathaniel Wallich. Gwee said there was "a serious failure to reframe – or at least re-evaluate – received history 200 years later and a related insensitivity to both local history and global feelings about colonialism" and that "Neutral history is lazy history. Colonialism is not neutral."

== Select bibliography ==
=== Graphic novels ===
- Myth of the Stone (East Asia Book Services, 1993) ISBN 978-981-00-4837-2
- Myth of the Stone: 20th Anniversary Edition (Epigram Books, 2013) ISBN 978-981-07-6616-0
- Old Men Solve Mystery (Self-published, 2018) ISBN 978-981-11-8605-9

=== Poetry ===
- Who Wants to Buy a Book of Poems? (Landmark Books, 1998) ISBN 981-3065-19-2
- One Thousand and One Nights (Landmark Books, 2014) ISBN 978-981-4189-53-8
- Who Wants to Buy an Expanded Edition of a Book of Poems? (Landmark Books, 2015) ISBN 978-981-4189-62-0
- The Other Merlion and Friends (Landmark Books, 2015) ISBN 978-981-4189-63-7
- Haikuku (Landmark Books, 2017) ISBN 978-981-4189-71-2
- Death Wish (Landmark Books, 2017) ISBN 978-981-4189-79-8
- This Floating World (Landmark Books, 2021) ISBN 978-981-1485-61-9
- Look How We've Already Forgotten (Landmark Books, 2025) ISBN 978-981-9434-38-1

=== Non-fiction ===
- Fear No Poetry!: An Essential Guide to Close Reading (Ethos Books, 2014) ISBN 978-981-09-0414-2
- Spiaking Singlish: A Companion to How Singaporeans Communicate (Marshall-Cavendish International, 2017) ISBN 978-981-47-9418-3
- The Leeter Spiaking Singlish. Book 1: End Particles (Marshall-Cavendish International, 2022) ISBN 978-981-4974-74-5
- The Leeter Spiaking Singlish. Book 2: Idioms (Marshall-Cavendish International, 2022) ISBN 978-981-5009-61-3
- The Leeter Spiaking Singlish. Book 3: Loanwords (Marshall-Cavendish International, 2022) ISBN 978-981-5009-65-1

=== Translations ===
- The Leeter Tunku (Edition Tintenfaß, 2019) ISBN 978-3-947994-17-5 - Singlish translation of Antoine de Saint-Exupéry's The Little Prince.
- The Tale of Peter Labbit (Edition Tintenfaß, 2021) ISBN 978-3-947994-71-7 - Singlish-English edition of Beatrix Potter's The Tale of Peter Rabbit.
- Grimms' Fairy Tales in Singlish: Ten Chewren's and Household Tales (Edition Tintenfaß, 2021) ISBN 978-3-947994-95-3 - Singlish translation of the Brothers Grimm's Children's and Household Tales.
- Winnie-da-Pooh in Singlish (Edition Tintenfaß, 2023) ISBN 978-3-98651-041-1 - Singlish translation of A. A. Milne's Winnie-the-Pooh.
- Kaka Farm (Edition Tintenfaß, 2024) ISBN 978-3-98651-089-3 - Singlish translation of George Orwell's Animal Farm.

=== Picture book ===
- Amazing Things (Yinthway Foundation, 2019) ISBN 978-99971-54-30-9

=== Fiction ===
- 2719 (Ethos Books, 2020) ISBN 978-981-14-3112-8

=== Monograph ===
- Mein Kampf Re-Examined (NUS Department of English Language and Literature, 1996) ISBN 978-981-00-8146-1

=== Edited volumes ===
- Sharing Borders: Studies in Contemporary Singaporean-Malaysian Literature II (National Library Board and National Arts Council Singapore, 2009) ISBN 978-981-08-3912-3 (hbk), ISBN 978-981-08-3913-0 (pbk)
- From the Window of the Epoch: An Anthology of Malaysian and Singaporean Poems, edited with Shamsudin Othman, Mohamed Pitchay Gani bin Mohamed Abdul Aziz, Tan Chee Lay, and Seetha Lakshmi (National Institute of Translation Malaysia and National Arts Council Singapore, 2010) ISBN 978-983-068-480-2
- Telltale: Eleven Stories (Ethos Books and National Arts Council Singapore, 2010) ISBN 978-981-08-6152-0
- Man/Born/Free: Writings on the Human Spirit from Singapore (Ethos Books, 2011) ISBN 978-981-08-8277-8
- Edwin Thumboo - Time Travelling: A Select Annotated Bibliography (With Recollections and Critical Essays), edited with Michelle Heng (National Library Board Singapore, 2012). ISBN 978-981-07-3347-6 (hbk), ISBN 978-981-07-3348-3 (pbk)
- Singathology: 50 New Works by Celebrated Singaporean Writers, 2 volumes (National Arts Council Singapore and Marshall Cavendish Editions, 2015) ISBN 9789814721462, ISBN 978-981-47-2147-9
- Written Country: The History of Singapore through Literature (Landmark Books, 2016) ISBN 978-981-41-8966-8
- Places: A Graphic Anthology on the East of Singapore (National Library Board Singapore, 2016) ISBN 978-981-11-0389-6
- Stranger to My World: The Covid Diary of a Bangladeshi Migrant Worker, by MD Sharif Uddin (Landmark Books, 2021) ISBN 978-981-18-0482-3
- The Epigram Books Collection of Best New Singaporean Short Stories: Volume Six (Epigram Books, 2023) ISBN 978-981-51-0538-4
- A Walk with My Pig, by Mervin Mirapuri (Pagesetters Services, 2023) ISBN 978-981-18-7935-7
