= S. Jayaraman =

Singaporean Tamil writer and yoga practitioner (born 1930)

- ச. செயராமன்
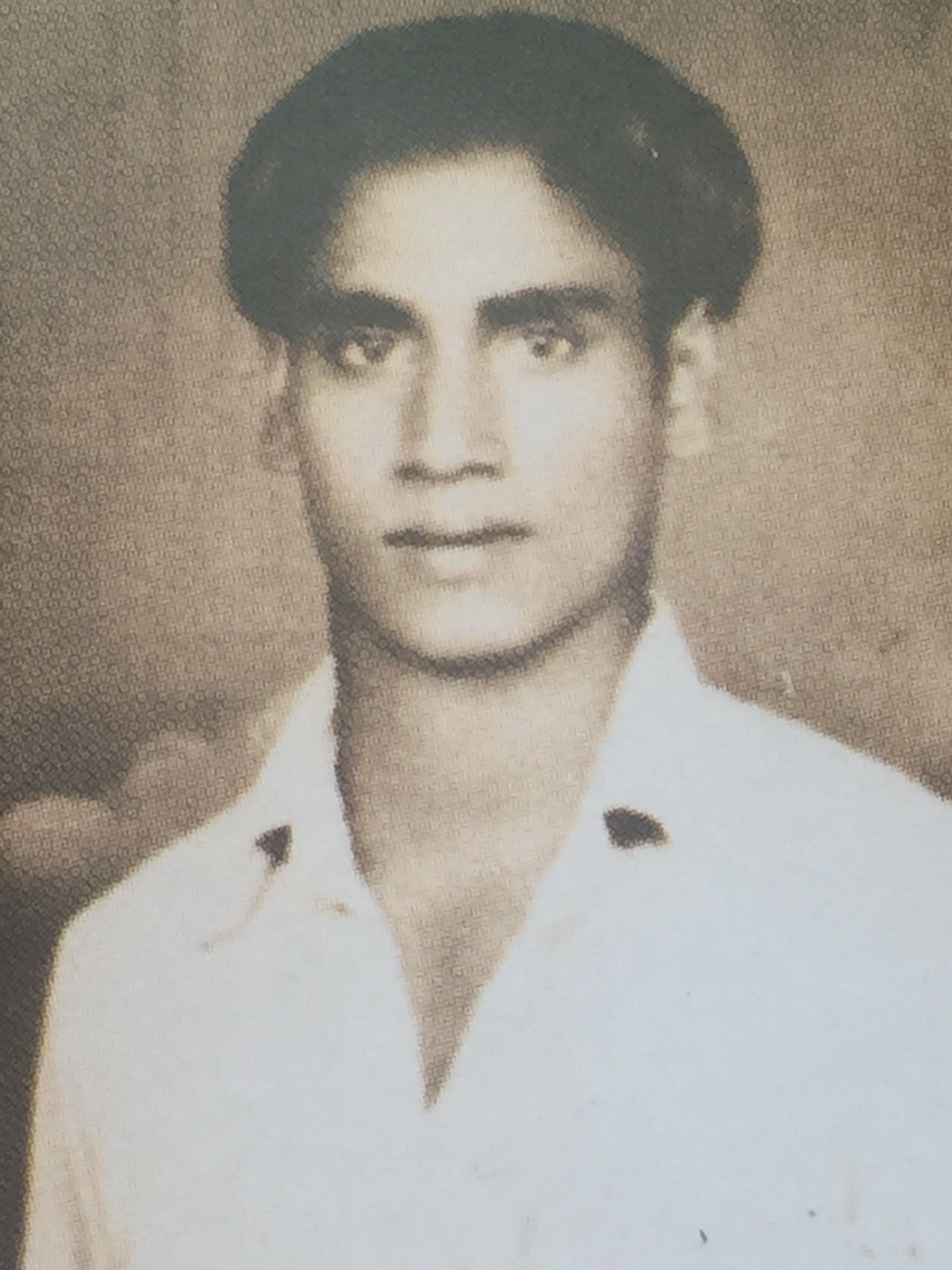
- Jayaraman in 1954
- Born: 28 December 1930 (age 95); Tamil Nadu, India
- Citizenship: Singaporean
- Education: Diploma in Electronics
- Occupation: Welder
- Employer: Keppel Shipyard
- Notable work: (1) மனித உடம்பில் மாபெரும் சக்தி, "Manitha Udambil Maaberum Sakthi, 1966 (2) திருவள்ளுவர் கண்ட உலகம், "Thiruvalluvar Kanda Ulagam”, 1996 (3) இறை நலம், "Erai Nalam”, 2006 (4) அன்பான வீடு அகிலம் புகழ் நாடு, "Anbaana Veedu Agilam Puhaz Naadu", 2006
- Spouse: J. Rajamani
- Children: 5 sons

S. Jayaraman (ச. செயராமன்; born 28 December 1930) is a Singaporean Tamil writer and yoga practitioner.

Jayaraman is the author of four books in Tamil, திருவள்ளுவர் கண்ட உலகம், "Thiruvalluvar Kanda Ulagam”, 1996, "Manitha Udambil Maaberum Sakthi (Great Powers of the Human Body), Erai Nalam and அன்பான வீடு அகிலம் புகழ் நாடு, "Anbaana Veedu Agilam Puhaz Naadu", 2006. S. Jayaraman was one of fifty prominent writers featured in the SG50 publication on Tamil writers. His contributions are considered as part of Singapore literature, a collection of literary works by Singaporeans in any of the country's four main languages: English, Malay, Standard Mandarin, and Tamil. The author was also a practitioner of kundalini yoga with the Simplified Kundalini Yoga Society in Singapore.

== Early life ==
S. Jayaraman arrived in Singapore in 1949 with his elder brother Thiru S. Ramakrishnan. At that time he could neither read nor write in Tamil or English. He attended night classes to study English, Tamil and Tamil literature in the 1960s. His Tamil teacher was Thiru Murugu Seenivaasan from whom he studied Tamil literature and prose writing. He also took part-time courses at the Singapore Electronics Institute in the 1960s and build a radio as part of his practical assignments. He received a Diploma in Electronics from the then Member of Parliament for Anson Govindasamy. He married J. Rajamani in 1954 in India. S. Jayaraman joined the Keppel Shipyard at Telok Blangah Road as a welder and worked there for 20 years until his retirement. He also received a gold medal for being the most productive employee in 1983.

== Literary works and publications ==
In 1962, S. Jayaraman participated and sang Bharathidasan's poem called "Puratchi Kavi" (Revolutionary Poem) in "villa paatu" format in Gan Eng Seng School. Villu Paatu (or 'Bow Song' as translated in English, Villu means Bow; Tamil: வில்லுப்பாட்டு) is an ancient form of musical story-telling where narration is interspersed with music, an art of South India. Simple tunes and simple verses make the story to be followed easily. The villu, a bow, the age-old weapon of warriors - paradoxically lends itself to be used as a primary musical instrument for the Villu Pattu artists. He also participated in an essay writing competition organised by the Klang Thirukkural Association in Malaysia and won the first prize for an essay entitled "Thirukuralum Ghandhiyadigalum". In his free time, S. Jayaraman offered free classes to a group of 10 young and aspiring literary talents in Singapore on Thirukkural appreciation, some of whom who later rose to become prominent Tamil writers and poets in Singapore.

S. Jayaraman's first book on yogic powers of the body was entitled "Manitha Udambil Maaberum Sakthi (Great Yogic Powers of the Human Body) in 1996. His second book in 1999 was called திருவள்ளுவர் கண்ட உலகம், "Thiruvalluvar Kanda Ulagam”, 1996, which was an interpretation of Thiruvalluvar's writings. Both publications were launched on 23rd Jan 2000 with the support of the Singapore National Library and the Singapore Tamil Youth Association at the Bukit Merah Community Centre. His third book called இறை நலம், "Erai Nalam”, 2006 and fourth book அன்பான வீடு அகிலம் புகழ் நாடு, "Anbaana Veedu Agilam Puhaz Naadu", 2006, a homage to his adopted motherland, were simultaneously launched on 11 Jun 2006 at Sri Srinivasa Perumal Temple in Singapore.

== Community service ==
S. Jayaraman helped to raise funds to purchase land to build a Tamil school for children in Sembawang on 20 November 1966. On 2 March 1968 he served as the chairman of the organising committee for the annual Tamil festival and also contributed an essay in the festival publication entitled "Tamilzhan Yaen Kaetaan?" (Tamilazhan's Downfall) and a poem called "Singaiyin Maanbu" (Singapore's Greatness). He also served as the chairman of the organising committee for annual deepavali celebration in Keppel Shipyard's Indian Association on 15 November 1980. The author also served in various capacities in the Tamil Language and Culture Association, Maathavi Literary Association as well as in the Sri Ruthra Kaliamman Temple building committees.

== Bibliography ==
1. மனித உடம்பில் மாபெரும் சக்தி, "Manitha Udambil Maaberum Sakthi, 1966
2. திருவள்ளுவர் கண்ட உலகம், "Thiruvalluvar Kanda Ulagam”, 1996
3. இறை நலம், "Erai Nalam”, 2006
4. அன்பான வீடு அகிலம் புகழ் நாடு, "Anbaana Veedu Agilam Puhaz Naadu", 2006
