= Alvin Pang =

Singaporean poet

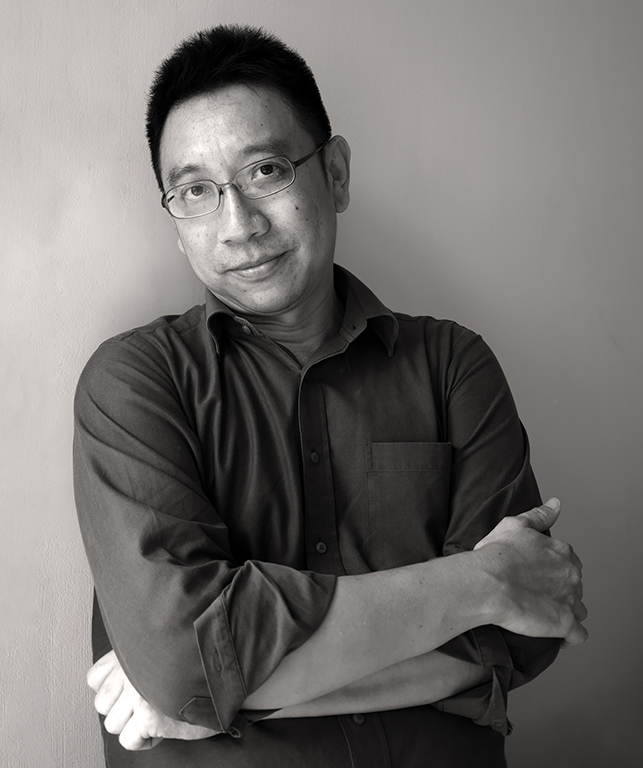
- Alvin Pang, 2018
- Born: May 1972 (age 54); Singapore
- Occupations: Poet, editor and writer

Alvin Pang (Chinese: 冯啟明; pinyin: Féng Qǐ Míng; born 1972, Singapore) is a Singaporean poet, editor and writer. He received the Young Artist Award (Literature) in 2005 by the National Arts Council Singapore. He holds a First Class Honours degree in English literature from the University of York. He was a University of Iowa International Writing Program Fellow in Writing (2002), and a Civitella Ranieri Fellow in 2022. In 2020, he was awarded a PhD in Writing from RMIT University, and appointed to the honorary position of Adjunct Professor of RMIT University in 2021. For his contributions, he was conferred the Singapore Youth Award (Arts and Culture) in 2007, and the JCCI Foundation Education Award in 2008. He is listed in the Oxford Companion to Modern Poetry in English (2nd Edition).

== Works ==
His first volume of poems, Testing the Silence (Ethos Books, 1997), was listed as one of the Top Ten Books of 1997 by The Straits Times and was short listed for the National Book Development Council of Singapore (NBDCS) Book Award in 1998/9. City of Rain (Ethos Books, 2003), his second volume of poetry, was the only Singaporean book to be named to the Straits Times Top Ten List for 2003.

His two 2012 volumes of poetry--Other Things and Other Poems (Brutal:Croatia), Teorija strun ["String Theory"] (JKSD:Slovenia), and When the Barbarians Arrive (Arc publications, UK)--are the first full volumes of poetry by a Singaporean poet to be published in their respective countries.

He is the co-editor of the seminal work No Other City: The Ethos Anthology of Urban Poetry (Ethos Books, 2000), one of the Straits Times' Top Ten Books for 2000 and a key text on university syllabuses. In 2001, he was one of a quartet of bilateral editors who developed a joint anthology of Singapore-Filipino love poetry. It was released as Love Gathers All: The Philippines-Singapore Anthology of Love Poetry (Anvil Press / Ethos Books, 2002), and won the Global Filipino Literary Award for Poetry in 2003. Pang is also co-editor, along with the poet John Kinsella, of Over There, an anthology of Singapore and Australian poetry, and of Double Skin, a bilingual anthology of Italian and Singapore poets (with Turin-based poet and editor Tiziano Fratus). In 2009 he curated the anthology Tumasik: Contemporary Writing from Singapore (Autumn Hill Books, USA).

== Publishing credits ==
Pang was the Featured Poet in the Spring 2002 issue of the Atlanta Review (USA), a journal which counts Nobel Prize laureates Seamus Heaney and Derek Walcott among its contributors; he is also among the select few poets celebrated in its 10th Anniversary edition. His work has also been featured in publications such as The Wolf (UK), English Review (UK), Salt (Australia), Paper Tiger (Australia), Australian Poetry Journal, Bonnier's Literary Magazine, Slope (USA), Washington Square Review (USA), Quarterly Literary Review Singapore, Interlogue: Studies in Singapore Literature, and RHYTHMS: The Millennium Anthology of Singapore Poetry, for which he was the English Language Poetry Editor. Pang's work also appears in the 2008 international anthology: Language for a New Century: Contemporary Poetry from the Middle East, Asia, and Beyond (W.W.Norton, 2008) and The Penguin Book of the Prose Poem (Penguin, 2018), among other international anthologies.

His poetry has appeared at the Poetry Society and Poetry Library in London; and has been staged by professional theatre companies in the US, Malaysia and Singapore. It has also been exhibited in the Asian Civilisations Museum, expressed as sound sculpture, screened on national television, and requested and read on BBC Radio.

Pang's poetry has been translated into more than 20 languages.

== Literary and other activities ==
A recipient of several Singapore International Foundation and National Arts Council grants, Pang frequently assists the National Arts Council in literary projects. He served on the organising committees of the Singapore Writer's Festival in 1997, 1999, 2001 and 2003. He is also a founder and coordinator of "WORDFEAST 2004" – Singapore's first international poetry festival. He was the 2009 Poet-In-Residence at Raffles Institution, his father's and his alma mater.

Pang has made several international appearances in support of Singaporean writing. He led a delegation of Singapore writers to Australia in July 2001 and another to the Austin International Poetry Festival in April 2002. He featured at the 2003 Edinburgh International Book Festival and the 2006 Sydney Writer's Festival as an invited international poet.

He has also read at literary festivals and events in Albany, Bali, Byron Bay, Cape Town, Darwin, Finland, Geraldton, Hong Kong, Kuala Lumpur, London, Ledbury, the Philippines, Perth, Adelaide, Melbourne, Slovenia, L'viv, Zagreb and elsewhere.

He was a participant at the Worlds 2012 literary gathering in Norwich, and represented Singapore at the Poetry Parnassus festival – part of the 2012 Cultural Olympiad in London.

A former teacher, civil servant, journalist, columnist and online producer, Pang pioneered an early online poetry anthology, The Poetry Billboard, and a Literary Singapore news website and mailing list. He has also contributed an occasional column to the Straits Times commentary section on technology, culture, society and other issues.

In 2003, Pang co-founded The Literary Centre (Singapore), a not-for-profit organisation dedicated to literary development, interdisciplinary capacity, multicultural communication, and positive social change, which he continues to direct.

In 2012, he was appointed to the advisory board of the International Poetry Studies Institute, based in the University of Canberra. He also serves on the international editorial board of Axon, a peer-reviewed journal that focuses on the characteristics of creativity and the creative process.

In 2022, he was a judge of the International Dublin Literary Award.

Pang consults on web, editorial and strategic communications, and research for a range of corporate and public sector organisations, and facilitates training and development programmes for schools and broader audiences.

He is also Editor-in-Chief of a professional public sector journal, Ethos.

== Selected bibliography (literary) ==
Poetry

- 1997 – Testing the Silence ISBN 981-00-9538-4
- 2003 – City of Rain ISBN 981-04-6329-4 / 978-981-08-4731-9
- 2006 – Other Things (chapbook of unpublished poems)
- 2012 – Other things and other poems (New and Selected Poems, with Croatian translation) (Brutal, Croatia) ISBN 978-953-57105-0-9
- 2012 – When the Barbarians Arrive (Arc publications, UK) ISBN 978-1-906570-98-9 (pbk) ISBN 978-1-906570-99-6 (hbk)
- 2012 – Teorija strun ["String Theory"] (Selected poems in Slovene translation) (JSKD, Slovenia)
- 2015 – När barbarerna kommer (Selected poems in Swedish translation) (Rámus, Sweden) ISBN 978-918-67033-9-4
- 2016 – Собата во пламен (Selected poems in Macedonian translation) (Antolog, Macedonia) ISBN 978-608-243-083-6
- 2017 – What Happened: Poems 1997-2017 ISBN 978-981-11-3753-2
- 2019 – Uninterrupted time (Recent Work Press) ISBN 978-064-85-5378-6
- 2023 - Diaphanous (with George Szirtes) (Recent Work Press) ISBN 978-0-6453563-9-7
- 2025 - All That Is Left Of The Sea (Red River Press) ISBN 978-93-48111-62-3

Creative Prose & Related Arts

- 2011 – What Gives Us Our Names ISBN 978-981-07-0128-4
- 2022 – Det som ger oss våra namn (Ramus Forlag, Sweden), translated by Henrik C. Enbohm
- 2024 – What Gives Us Our Names: Rosetta Edition (Rosetta Cultures, Singapore)
- 2025 – Lo que nos da nuestros nombres (Perro Azul, Costa Rica), translated by Luis Chacón Ortiz

Anthologies (as editor)

- 2000 – No Other City: The Ethos Anthology of Urban Poetry (with Aaron Lee) ISBN 981-04-2276-8
- 2002 – Love Gathers All : The Philippines-Singapore Love Anthology (with Aaron Lee, Ramon Sunico and Alfred Yuson) ISBN 981-04-5101-6
- 2008 – Over There: Poems from Singapore and Australia (with John Kinsella) ISBN 978-981-05-9461-9
- 2009 – Double Skin: New Poetic Voices from Italy and Singapore (with Tiziano Fratus) ISBN 978-981-08-2721-2
- 2009 – TUMASIK: Contemporary Writing from Singapore (Autumn Hill, USA) ISBN 978-0-9843036-2-5 (ISBN 978-0-9843036-0-1)
- 2011 – Moving Words 2011: A Poetry Anthology ISBN 978-981-07-0356-1
- 2015 – UNION: 15 years of Drunken Boat / 50 years of writing from Singapore (with Ravi Shankar) ISBN 978-981-09-6489-4

Translations

- 2010 – The Poems of Yeng Pway Ngon – Vol 1: Rebellion (with Goh Beng Choo)

== See also ==
- Literature of Singapore
- Poetry.SG
