= Kelvin Tan (guitarist) =

Singaporean musician, singer and writer (born 1964)

- Born: 22 August 1964 (age 61); Singapore
- Education: Bachelor of Arts (Honours) in Literature
- Alma mater: Anglo-Chinese School; Jurong Junior College; National University of Singapore
- Occupations: musician, writer, lecturer

Kelvin Tan (born 22 August 1964) is a Singaporean musician, writer, and lecturer. He has released two novels, All Broken Up and Dancing (1992), and the Nethe(r);R (2001) and over 102 musical albums. He teaches part-time at LASALLE College of the Arts and is a guitarist for The Oddfellows, for whom he wrote and sang the hit "She's So Innocent", from the album Carnival (1992).

Tan is also a member of the bands Stigmata, Prana vs r-H, and Path Integral. In 1997, he was one of the co-founding members of Aporia Society, a multi-disciplinary arts society.

== Early life ==
He was educated at Anglo-Chinese School. As a 14-year-old, he was introduced to the music of Charlie Parker, Bob Dylan, and Joni Mitchell, and the literature of JD Salinger, Saul Bellow, and Philip Roth. He failed his O-Levels in 1981. Tan later attended Jurong Junior College and graduated from the National University of Singapore with a Bachelor of Arts (Honours) in Literature in 1990.

== Career ==
In 1982, Tan was awarded a merit certificate for "Swan Leda" in the Shell National Short-Story Competition. In 1986, his play Tramps Like Us was awarded third prize in the Shell Short Play Competition. He joined The Oddfellows as lead guitarist in 1991.

His novel All Broken Up and Dancing (1992) was originally a short story published in The Straits Times in 1985. In 1986, he contributed the song "Seen the End" to BigO magazine's Nothing on the Radio cassette. The song was a response to the Hotel New World disaster of the same year.

== Bibliography ==
=== Novels ===
- Kelvin Tan (1992), All Broken Up and Dancing, Thesaurus Media Publications, ISBN 978-981-00-3998-1
- Kelvin Tan (2001), The Nethe(r);R, Aporia Society, ISBN 978-981-04-3972-9

=== Plays ===
- Tramps Like Us (1986)
- Goodbye Jennifer (1987–88)
- Flights Through Darkness (1994–95)
- Life is an Angel (1998)
- Vermeiden//a(Void) (1998)
