= Don Bosco (author) =

Singaporean writer

- Born: June 1971 (age 55); Singapore
- Education: National University of Singapore
- Occupations: Writer, publisher
- Years active: 24
- Known for: young adult fiction, Singapore music
- Title: Author
- Website: supercoolbooks.com

Don Bosco (born in June 1971) is a writer and publisher of fiction books from Singapore. In 2011, he founded Super Cool Books, a publishing company with interest in fantasy and mystery stories for children and young adults. As an active advocate of self-publishing and digital publishing, he has published ebooks, paperbacks and an iPad app.

== Career ==
Don Bosco received a PhD in Youth culture studies at the National University of Singapore in 2008. Then, he started out writing speculative fiction for middle grade readers. His first books were the Time Talisman ebook series, originally published by Select Books, about three Singaporean kids who travel back in time. This was followed by the Sherlock Hong series, about a young detective who lived in Singapore 100 years ago. His other titles include Diary of Young Justice Bao, based on the legendary Chinese hero Bao Zheng, and Ghostly. In 2013 Super Cool Books worked with digital partner Tusitala Books to release its first iPad. From 2014 onwards he began developing titles for an older international audience, such as Thor the Greatest, based on the Norse folk tale The Theft of Thor's Hammer . Super Cool Books typically works with collaborators from around the world, including British crime author John Rickards/Sean Cregan.

Besides writing fiction, he is a DIY/maker enthusiast and has developed learning kits for kids based on his stories. These have been featured at Hackidemia events in Singapore. He was previously a freelance writer for various magazines, books and TV shows. He also writes articles promoting Singapore's DIY music culture.

== Selected publications ==
Don Bosco has authored and published numerous books and collections as follows:

=== eBooks ===
- 7 December 2013: Thor the Greatest (fiction)
- 23 July 2013: Diary of Young Justice Bao – The Case of the Grand Fish (fiction)
- 15 February 2013: Ghostly (non-fiction)
- 27 October 2012: The Peranakan Princess (fiction)
- 27 October 2012: The Immortal Nightingale (fiction)
- 14 July 2012: School of Magical Stories
- 11 June 2012: Fantasy & Friends (Volume 1)
- 14 July 2012: School of Magical Stories (non-fiction)
- 27 October 2012: Sherlock Hong, Book 1: The Immortal Nightingale
- 27 October 2012: Sherlock Hong, Book 2: The Peranakan Princess
- September 2012: Time Talisman, Book 1: The Secret of Monk's Hill
- September 2012: Time Talisman, Book 2: Newton's Curse

=== Paperbacks ===
- 23 July 2013: Diary of Young Justice Bao, Book 1: The Case of the Grand Fish
- 15 February 2013: Ghostly
- 27 October 2012: Sherlock Hong, Book 1: The Immortal Nightingale
- 27 October 2012: Sherlock Hong, Book 2: The Peranakan Princess

== See also ==
- Singapore Writers Festival
