= Grace Chia =

Singaporean writer, poet, journalist and editor

Grace Chia (born 1973) is a Singaporean writer, poet, journalist and editor.

== Career ==
Chia has published numerous books of poetry, fiction and non-fiction, including a novel, The Wanderlusters and a short story collection, Every Moving Thing That Lives Shall Be Food.

Her poetry collections includes womango in 1998, Cordelia in 2012 which was nominated for the 2014 Singapore Literature Prize and Mother of All Questions in 2017. Her chapbook The Cuckoo Conundrum was featured in The Straits Times as one of the choice picks from a box set series of chapbooks published by the NAC-NTU Writer-in-Residencies.

Chia's work womango engages confessional poetry, poetic prose, concrete poetry and performance poetry to explore themes of identity politics from an Asian, female point of view. In an interview with The Wall Street Journal, former Director of the Singapore Writers Festival, Paul Tan, described her work, along with Cyril Wong, as "sensuous and provocative". Publishers Weekly singled out her short story, "Dewy", amongst many others in the speculative fiction anthology, Fish Eats Lion: New Singaporean Speculative Fiction edited by Jason Erik Lundberg for being one of two "uncomfortable takes on domestic employment's darker side".

Her poetry and short stories have been anthologised in publications in Singapore, US, Australia, Germany, France, Hong Kong and Serbia, including Singapore Literature in English: An Anthology, The Brooklyn Rail, Mining for Meaning, Merlion: An Anthology of Poems, Fish Eats Lion, Cha: An Asian Literary Journal, UnFree Verse, Stylus Poetry Journal, die horen, La Traductiere and Knijzevne Novine.

She was the NAC-NTU Writer-in-Residence for 2011-2012.
