= Faith Ng =

Playwright (b. 1987)

- Born: June 25, 1987
- Occupation: Playwright
- Writing career
- Language: English

Faith Ng (born 25 June 1987) is a Singaporean playwright. Her plays are noted for their rich characterization and sensitive portrayals of Singapore life. She is currently the Associate Artistic Director of Checkpoint Theatre.

Ng is the second daughter of Stefanie, a tutor, and Raymond, a logistics manager. She has a twin sister named Debbie; their elder sister is Cheryl. She is married to theatre academic Assistant Professor Alvin Lim.

== Works ==
Stage
Year	Title	Notes
2010	wo(men)	A NUS Arts Festival 2010 commission & Festival Opening Production
2013	For Better or For Worse	Produced by Checkpoint Theatre; staged 20 to 24 March 2013 at Drama Centre Black Box
2015	Normal	Produced by Checkpoint Theatre; first staged April 2015 at Drama Centre Black Box, restaged in 2017.
2017	Whale Fall	Produced by The Necessary Stage; first staged August 2017 at The Necessary Stage Black Box.
2018	A Good Death	Produced by The Esplanade; first staged March to April 2018 at The Esplanade Theatre Studio.
2022	The Fourth Trimester	Produced by Checkpoint Theatre; first staged Aug 2022 at Drama Center Theatre.

Books
Year	Title	ISBN	Notes
2016	Faith Ng: Plays Volume 1	ISBN 9789811116131	Edited by Lucas Ho; Introduction by Dr. Philip Holden
2026	Hard Mode	ISBN missing	Offered as the sole Singapore text in the GCE ‘O’ Levels English Literature examination

== Awards ==
Year	Nominee / work	Award	Result
2011	wo(men)	Best Original Script, Life! Theatre Awards	Nominated
2014	For Better Or For Worse	Best Original Script, Life! Theatre Awards	Nominated
2019	-	Young Artist Award	Won
2023	The Fourth Trimester	Best Production, Best Original Script, ST Life Theatre Awards	Won
2025	Hard Mode	Best Original Script, ST Life Theatre Awards	Won
