= Hwee Hwee Tan =

Singaporean writer

Hwee Hwee Tan (or Tan Hwee Hwee in traditional order) is a Singaporean writer.

== Biography ==
Tan was born in Singapore in 1974. During her youth she studied at Raffles Girls' School followed by three years in the Netherlands. After her studies in the Netherlands, she studied English literature at the University of East Anglia, from which she graduated with honours. Tan also holds a master's degree in English Studies (1500-1660) from the University of Oxford. After winning the New York Times Fellowship in 1997 she studied creative writing at New York University. She has since received her MFA in creative writing at New York University. She has published various short stories before, and at the age of 23, she got her first book, Foreign Bodies (1997), to print. Her second novel, Mammon Inc (2001), was adapted for the stage during the 2002 Singapore Arts Festival and won the 2004 Singapore Literature Prize. Furthermore, she has received awards from the National Arts Council, the National University of Singapore, the New York Times Foundation and the British Broadcasting Corporation. In 2003, she was awarded the Young Artist Award.

She currently resides in Singapore.

== Works ==
- Foreign Bodies. London: Michael Joseph, 1997. ISBN 0718142551
- Mammon Inc. London: Michael Joseph, 2001. ISBN 071814256X
