= Arthur Yap =

Singaporean poet, writer and painter

Arthur Yap (叶纬雄)
- Born: Arthur Yap Chioh Hiong; 1943
- Died: 19 June 2006 (aged 63)
- Occupations: Poet, Pedagogue
- Writing career
- Notable awards: 1976: Poetry award by the National Book Development Council of Singapore; 1983:Cultural Medallion for Literature; South-East Asian Write Award, Bangkok

Arthur Yap Chioh Hiong (simplified Chinese: 叶纬雄; traditional Chinese: 葉緯雄; pinyin: Yè Wěi Xióng; 1943 – 19 June 2006) was a Singaporean poet, writer and painter.

== Biography ==
Arthur Yap was born in Singapore, the sixth child of a carpenter and a housewife. Yap attended St Andrew's School and the University of Singapore, after which he won a British Council scholarship to study at the University of Leeds in England. At Leeds Arthur earned a master's degree in Linguistics and English Language Teaching, later obtaining his PhD from the National University of Singapore in the years after he returned from Leeds. He stayed on in the university's Department of English Language and Literature as a lecturer between the years 1979 and 1998. Between 1992 and 1996, Yap served as a mentor with the Creative Arts Programme run by the Ministry of Education to help inspire students and nurture young writers at local secondary schools and junior colleges. Yap was then diagnosed with lung cancer, and received radiotherapy treatment. Yap was known to be an intensely private man.

== Poetry ==
Yap's poetry is distinctive for an unusual linguistic playfulness and subtlety that is able to bridge the rhythms of Singlish with the precision of acrolectic English. Unsurprisingly, the craft of Yap's voice has the admiration of other writers. Anthony Burgess has written that he encountered Down the Line "with elation and occasional awe", while D. J. Enright has praised Yap's "sophisticated cosmopolitan intelligence". The Oxford Companion to 20th-Century Poetry describes Yap's poems as "original, but... demanding: elliptical, dense, dry, sometimes droll. At their best, they shuttle between playfulness and sobriety and are alert to the rhythms and contours of the natural and the peopled landscape, seasoning insight with compassion."

His first collection of poems Only Lines was published in 1971, when he was 28. It had a first print run of 2,000 to 3,000 copies. Its whimsical, wordplay-based humour captured the hearts of poetry lovers, and it won the first poetry award from the National Book Development Council of Singapore in 1976. An analysis of the poems from Only Lines finds moments of both celebration and apology for the power of the written word. At times he begins his verses as if in mid-conversation with the reader:

should i also add:
here are only lines
linked by the same old story.
the same old plot
in which they are grown

The pun on the word 'plot' in this passage, denoting both a storyline and a piece of land, suggests a dimensionality in the language that belies the dismissive adjective 'only'.

Other signature features of Yap's poems include his choice of simple words, and the use of all-lowercase style favoured by American poet E. E. Cummings.

Yap's second collection Commonplace was published in 1977. The third collection, Down The Line (1980) was acclaimed and won Yap his second Book Council Award. In 1983, Yap was honored with Singapore's Cultural Medallion for Literature and the South-East Asian Write Award in Bangkok. Yap described this as one of the high points in his literary career. Translations of his books were published in many Asian countries, mainly in the Japanese, Mandarin and Malay languages. In 1988, Yap won his third Book Council Award for Man Snake Apple & Other Poems (1986).

One of Yap's short stories was included in Singapore Short Stories, which was used worldwide for the 'O' Levels from 1991 to 1992. Yap's poems 'In Passing', about the restlessness of the modern world, and 'Old House at Ann Siang Hill' were included in The Calling of Kindred: Poems from the English-speaking World, a poetry anthology prescribed for the 'O' Levels in Singapore from 1996 to 1997. His poems also have been included in a literature course offered by McMaster University in Ontario, Canada, and collected in anthologies like New Voices of the Commonwealth, The Flowering Tree and The Second Tongue: An Anthology of Poetry from Malaysia and Singapore. Selected poems of his are on the reading lists of West Virginia University and New York University Sydney. Yap also served as the general editor of literary magazine Singa, first published in 1981.

In 1998, Yap received the Montblanc-NUS Centre for the Arts Literary Award for English.

A selection from each of Yap's previous books was compiled in The Space of City Trees: Selected Poems published in 2000. Extracts from The Space of City Trees were subsequently published in The Straits Times' Life! Books section. NUS Press published The collected poems of Arthur Yap and Noon at five o'clock, a collection of his short stories, in 2013 and 2014 respectively. Yap's paintings decorated both book covers.

In 2015, Down the Line was selected by The Business Times as one of the Top 10 English Singapore books from 1965 to 2015, alongside titles by Goh Poh Seng and Daren Shiau.

== Painting ==
Yap was also a painter. His passion for painting began in 1967 when he was working as a Pre-University English Literature teacher at the Serangoon Gardens English School. During the weekends he would pick up the brush, expressing himself through his abstract works of art. On 13 April 1969 Arthur Yap held his first solo art exhibition featuring 44 square abstract paintings at the National Library in Stamford Road. Yap went on to have a total of seven solo exhibitions in Singapore, as well as participating in group exhibitions in Malaysia, Thailand and Australia. Yap's paintings were also chosen to represent Singapore at the Adelaide Festival of Arts in 1972.

== Death ==
After a two-and-half-year battle with throat cancer, Yap died in his sleep at home on 19 June 2006. He was 63. The cancer had recurred in 2004, and Yap underwent major surgery to remove his voice box.

== Works ==
- Only Lines (Federal Publications, 1971)
- Commonplace (Heinemann Educational Books, 1977)
- Down the Line (Heinemann Educational Books, 1980) ISBN 9971640023
- Man Snake Apple & Other Poems (Heinemann Asia, 1986) ISBN 9971641089
- The space of city trees: selected poems (Skoob, 2000) ISBN 1-871438-39-X
- The collected poems of Arthur Yap (NUS Press, 2013) ISBN 9789971696535
- Noon at five o'clock: the short stories of Arthur Yap (NUS Press, 2014) ISBN 9789971697914
- 2 mothers in a hdb playground(down the line,1980)
