= Quarterly Literary Review Singapore =

Singapore literary journal

Quarterly Literary Review Singapore (QLRS) is a Singapore online literary journal founded and edited by Singaporean poet Toh Hsien Min in 2001.

Its mission is to promote the literary arts in Singapore, to stimulate the feedback mechanisms in the literary scene, and to develop Singaporean writers to international standards.

== Overview ==
The first issue of QLRS appeared in October 2001. The journal is an online publication and is structured as a non-profit volunteer collective, and publishes poetry, short stories, essays, criticism and interviews, among others, from writers in Singapore and abroad. Besides Toh, the magazine's editorial team includes or has included other Singapore writers such as Heng Siok Tian, Cyril Wong, Yong Shu Hoong, Yeow Kai Chai and Alfian Sa'at. The journal has published work by writers such as Leonard Schwartz, John Tranter, John Mateer, Arthur Yap, Wena Poon, Tania De Rozario, Desmond Kon and Kirby Wright. Originally Singapore-focused, later publications have extended its scope into South East Asian and diasporic writers.

For its 20th anniversary in 2021, QLRS released released physical copies of the journal in the form of a physical box set, which gathers 100 past contributions from Singaporean and international writers. The works were curated and edited by the journal's current editors - founder Toh Hsien Min, Yeow Kai Chai, Yong Shu Hoong and Stephanie Ye.

Short stories and poetry first published in QLRS have been used as examinable texts within schools and in international and nationwide examinations. An example is Grace Chua's poem, (love song, with two goldfish), which was used in the International Baccalaureate English examination.

== See also ==
- List of literary magazines
