= Yeow Kai Chai =

Singaporean poet

Yeow Kai Chai is a poet from Singapore. He is also an editor of the Quarterly Literary Review Singapore. Appointed by the National Arts Council, he was the director of the Singapore Writers Festival from 2015 to 2018. The 2015 event reached an audience of more than 19,700 with a broadened lineup featuring music, dance, drama and art events. He is a former Straits Times journalist, and the former director of the Singapore Writers Festival.

With writings influenced by music videos and other forms of artistic impressions, he is an MA graduate in English Literature from the National University of Singapore, and has published three poetry collections: Secret Manta (2001), Pretend I'm Not Here (2006) and One To The Dark Tower Comes (2021). The latter poetry collection won the Singapore Literature Prize in 2022. In 2014, he participated in the International Writing Program's Fall Residency at the University of Iowa in Iowa City, IA.
