= Lee Tzu Pheng =

Singaporean poet

Anne Lee Tzu Pheng
- Born: Lee Tzu Pheng; 13 May 1946 (age 80); Singapore
- Education: Raffles Girls' Secondary School
- Alma mater: University of Singapore (Ph.D)
- Occupations: Poet, former English lecturer
- Spouse: Ban Kah Choon (divorced)
- Children: 1
- Writing career
- Language: English

Anne Lee Tzu Pheng (born 13 May 1946) is a Singaporean poet. She has five volumes of poems to her name; of these, the first three, Prospect of a Drowning (1980), Against the Next Wave (1988) and The Brink of An Amen (1991) were winners of the National Book Development Council of Singapore (NBDCS) Award. After converting to Catholicism, Lee Tzu Pheng added Anne to her name to reflect her new faith.

== Early life and education ==
Lee was born on 13 May 1946 in Singapore. She was educated at Raffles Girls' Secondary School and then obtained a Ph.D. in English from the University of Singapore in 1973.

== Career ==
Lee worked as a senior lecturer in the English Department of National University of Singapore.

In 1985, Lee was awarded the Cultural Medallion in Literature.

In 1995, Lee was awarded the Gabriela Mistral Award by the Chilean government in commemoration of the 50th anniversary of Chilean poet Gabriela Mistral winning the Nobel Prize in Literature. The award was given to 50 foreign writers and Lee was the only Singaporean receiving it.

== Style of writing ==
Lee's poetry is meditative and lyrical in nature and with themes such as the individual's search for identity and larger unifying humanity in Against the Next Wave (1988) and The Brink of an Amen (1991). Her later poetry increasingly questions faith and religion, evident in her work, Lambada by Galilee (1999). However, her most anthologised work to date is an early poem, My Country and My People (1976), which expresses her ambivalent attitude towards patriotism and nationhood. For Lee, more often than not, poetry is an expression of the poet's experiences in life.

== Works ==
Lee is often seen as one of a generation of "nation-building" English writers in Singapore, whose work in the '50s-'70s questioned the identity of the newly independent nation. One of her early poems, "My Country, My People", was banned by the Singapore government due to fears that her reference to her "brown-skinned neighbours" would offend the Malay community of Singapore. Another early poem, "Bukit Timah, Singapore" was at one point included in an international selection of poetry for O-level literature students. Later poems heavily reference her Catholic faith. In 2014, she was inducted into the Singapore Women's Hall of Fame.

== Personal life ==
Lee married Ban Kah Choon and they have one daughter. They are divorced.

== Poetry collections ==
- Prospect of a Drowning (1980, Heinemann Educational Books) ISBN 9971640015
- Against the Next Wave (1988, Times Books International) ISBN 9971655055
- The Brink of an Amen (1991, Times Books International) ISBN 9812042334
- Lambada by Galilee & Other Surprises (1997, Times Books International) ISBN 9812047883
- Catching Connections: Poems, Prosexcursions, Crucifictions (2012, Landmark Books) ISBN 9789814189422
- Short Circuits: Through the Catchments of Faith and Writing (2012, Landmark Books) ISBN 9789814189415
- Sing a Song of Mankind: A Nursery Sequence for the Sixties (2012, Landmark Books) ISBN 9789814189408
- Soul's Festival: Collected poems 1980-1997 (2014, Landmark Books) ISBN 9789814189514
- Standing in the Corner: Poems from a Real Childhood (2014, Landmark Books) ISBN 9789814189521
- Common Life: Drawings and Poems (2018, Ethos Books) ISBN 9789811178405

== Awards ==
- National Book Development Council Of Singapore Awards for her three books
- Singapore Cultural Medallion for Literature (1985)
- S.E.A. Write Award (1987)
- Gabriela Mistral Award (1996)
