= Singapore Writers Festival =

The Singapore Writers Festival is a literary event organised by the National Arts Council. Inaugurated in 1986, the festival serves a dual function of promoting new and emerging Singaporean and Asian writing to an international audience, as well as presenting foreign writers to Singaporeans.

SWF has hosted Singaporean writers Meira Chand, Cyril Wong, Suchen Christine Lim and You Jin, as well as international writers such as Steven Levitt, Michael Chabon, Neil Gaiman, Bi Feiyu, David Mitchell, Bei Dao, F. Sionil Jose, Taichi Yamada, Andrew Motion, Alexis Wright and Marc Smith.

To date, it remains one of the few literary festivals in the world that is multi-lingual, celebrating works in Singapore’s official languages – English, Malay, Chinese and Tamil.

== History ==
In 1986, Singapore Writers’ Week started as part of the Singapore Festival of Arts that focuses on the merit of the literary arts.

In 1991, the Singapore Writers’ Week was renamed as Singapore Writers Festival and was also presented outside the Festival of Arts as recognition and awareness for literary arts in Singapore grew. The festival was held biannually. The festival has traditionally been organised by the National Arts Council (NAC). However, since 2007, NAC has been working with Arts House Limited to co-organise the festival.

In 2010, Singaporean poet Paul Tan became the first director of the festival and SWF became an annual event from 2011 onwards. In July 2014, writer Ovidia Yu resigned from the festival's steering committee in protest against the National Library Board's (NLB) move to pulp children's picturebooks with homosexual themes. NLB is a programme partner of the festival.

From 2015 to 2018, the festival was helmed by poet Yeow Kai Chai. The festival also returned to The Arts House and held its activities in the Empress Place Civic District.

From 2019 to 2023, the festival was led by poet Pooja Nansi, who was also Singapore's first Youth Poet Ambassador. Nansi navigated the festival through hybrid editions over the COVID-19 pandemic, and was honored in the Life 2023 power list for restoring excitement to the festival through a more all-encompassing and general approach, bringing on board community and youth curators to build a more accessible festival.

Since 2024, the festival has been led by poet Yong Shu Hoong. Yong's approach has been noted as more understated and scaled-down, while continuing to direct attention to marginalised segments of society, such as persons with disabilities and ex-offenders.

The festival's attendance has grown over the years, with 21,000 attendees in 2007, to 50,000 attendees in 2011. After the COVID-19 pandemic, the 2022 edition drew more than 46,000 visitors.

== Golden Point Award ==
The Golden Point Award (GPA) started in 1993 and has been organised in conjunction with SWF by the National Arts Council of Singapore. With official sponsorship from SPH and Singapore Press Holdings Foundation in 2009 and 2011, the award was given the additional title of the SPH-NAC Golden Point Award.

It is the only national literary writing competition for poetry and short story in Singapore which promotes the art of creative writing in all four languages (English, Malay, Chinese and Tamil). Many past winners are now well-established writers (e.g. Alfian Sa'at, Aaron Maniam, Cyril Wong, Joshua Ip, Tania de Rozario, Claire Tham, Anuar Othman).

In its aim to uncover new writing talent in Singapore, a new guideline was introduced in 2007 where only unpublished writers are eligible for the competition. This is also to differentiate SPH-NAC GPA from other literary prizes which focus on published works. While the new rule sparked some debate and attracted due attention, the result was an overall increase in both the number of participants and entries for the competition.

Since 1997, the First Prize winners of SPH-NAC GPA have received an Enrichment Grant of up to S$6,000. This aim of this grant is to provide writers with sufficient funds to participate in writing seminars, workshops, literature festivals overseas, or to publish their first solo publication.
