= BooksActually =

Independent bookstore in Singapore

- Type: Bookstore
- Founded: 2005; 21 years ago
- Founders: Kenny Leck, Karen Wai
- Headquarters: Singapore
- Owner: Kenny Leck
- Website: http://www.booksactually.com/

BooksActually was an independent online bookstore. It operated a shop that was located in Singapore's Tiong Bahru district until 2020.

== History and description ==
BooksActually was established by Kenny Leck and Karen Wai in 2005 on the second floor of a shophouse along Telok Ayer Street. The bookstore subsequently moved to Ann Siang Hill in 2007, and opened a second outlet at Club Street in 2008. Due to an increase in rent, they closed up Ann Siang Hill and moved from Club Street to Yong Siak Street in Tiong Bahru in 2011. BooksActually regularly hosted literary events including book launches and poetry readings, acoustic sessions, and mini exhibitions. In 2011 the bookstore organised the exhibition An Ode to Penguin, held at The Arts House, that showcased over 1,000 Penguin Books from their private collection.

BooksActually was a regular organiser of pop-up stores at various retail locations around Singapore, such as Orchard Cineleisure, TANGS PlayLab, New Majestic Hotel, HOUSE @ Dempsey, Millenia Walk and Great World City. It hosted the Monocle Seasonal Shop in Shop in 2013.

For three years, The Straits Times listed Kenny Leck, co-founder of BooksActually, as one of the top 20 Most Powerful People in the Arts in Singapore.

In 2015, BooksActually celebrated its 10-year anniversary by holding an exhibition entitled "10 Years of BooksActually" at the Substation from 18 to 22 Nov. A special edition of Cyril Wong's short story "The Boy with the Flower that Grew out of his Ass" was printed for the occasion.

In June 2016, BooksActually placed automated book vending machines at the National Museum of Singapore, Singapore Visitors Centre and Goodman Arts Centre as an alternative means of book distribution.

In 2018, BooksActually launched the "BooksActually Shophouse Fund" in order to raise funds to purchase a new premises to avoid having to pay rising rent. This was done through the sale of bricks that sold at $10 and $50.

On 13 September 2020, due to the COVID-19 pandemic, BooksActually closed down its store and became a fully online book store.

In September 2021, Kenny Leck stepped down from sole ownership of BooksActually after admitting to "personal failings before mid-2019".

In December 2022, BooksActually's shop at 44 Upper Weld Road was seen closed during its listed opening hours. The Straits Times reported later in February 2023 that its employees were uncontactable since November 2022, and that its shop was listed for rent.

== Math Paper Press ==
BooksActually ran a boutique publishing house, Math Paper Press, focusing on developing new literary voices in Singapore, and has published more than 90 titles since its inception in 2011. Math Paper Press also distributed books from independent presses such as Giramondo (Australia) and design firms such as Hjgher and Anonymous Pte Ltd, and expanded into publishing comics and graphic novels.

It had published award-winning authors such as Alvin Pang, Alfian Sa'at and Cyril Wong. In the 2016 Singapore Literature Prize shortlist, the press placed four of the six titles for the English Poetry category. The press co-won the 2014 Singapore Literature Prize in English Poetry for Joshua Ip's "sonnets from the singlish". Subsequently, the 2016 Singapore Literature Prize in English Poetry was shared between Cyril Wong's The Lover's Inventory and Desmond Kon's I Didn't Know Mani Was A Conceptualist, both Math Paper Press titles.
