= Ethos Books =

Singaporean independent book publisher

- Parent company: Pagesetters Services Pte Ltd
- Founded: 1997; 28 years ago
- Founder: Fong Hoe Fang
- Country of origin: Singapore
- Distribution: Worldwide
- Publication types: Books
- Official website: ethosbooks.com.sg

Ethos Books is an independent book publisher based in Singapore established in 1997. It is an imprint of Pagesetters Services Pte Ltd, a communications and design house. Ethos Books specialises in publishing literary works of fiction, non-fiction and poetry primarily from writers in Singapore. It has published several award-winning poetry volumes and anthologies by authors such as Felix Cheong, Alvin Pang, Alfian Sa'at, Cyril Wong and Daren Shiau. In recent years, it has published critical works on Singapore studies by scholars and activists such as Cherian George, Loh Kah Seng, Kevin YL Tan, Thum Ping Tjin, and Teo You Yenn.

== History ==
In 1997, publisher Fong Hoe Fang founded Ethos Books, an imprint of Pagesetters Services, an advertising and communication design agency, to lend voice to diverse and emerging writers and to help foster a thriving literary culture. He launched it with a trio of titles by newcomers – namely Aaron Lee's A Visitation of Sunlight, Alvin Pang's Testing the Silence and David Leo's One Journey, Many Rivers.
