= Chen Lin =

Chen Lin may refer to:

- Chen Lin (Han dynasty) (died 217), Han dynasty minister, author and poet
- Chen Lin (painter), (c. 1260–c. 1320), Yuan dynasty painter
- Chen Lin (Ming dynasty) (1543–1607), Ming dynasty naval general
- Chen Lin (singer) (1970–2009), Chinese pop singer
- Chen Lin (badminton) (born 1977), Chinese badminton player
- Chen Lin (diver) (born 1970), Chinese diver
- Lin Chen (playwright) (1919–2004)
- Lin Chen (chess player) (born 1988), Chinese chess player
- Lin Chen (economist), 20th- and 21st-century economist; see Chen model
