= Tang Liang Hong =

Singaporean politician (1935–2025)

- 鄧亮洪
- Tang in 1997

Personal details
- Born: 2 October 1935 Singapore, Straits Settlements
- Died: 15 September 2025 (aged 89) Hong Kong
- Party: Workers' Party (1997)
- Spouse: Teo Siew Har (died 2019)
- Children: 3
- Education: Nanyang University; University of Singapore
- Profession: politician, lawyer

Tang Liang Hong (simplified Chinese: 邓亮洪; traditional Chinese: 鄧亮洪; Pe̍h-ōe-jī: Tāng Liāng-hông; 2 October 1935 – 15 September 2025) was a Singaporean politician and lawyer. He was a candidate for the opposition Workers' Party (WP) in Cheng San Group Representation Constituency (GRC) during the 1997 general election; the WP team was defeated by the governing People's Action Party (PAP).

== Early life and education ==
Tang was born in Singapore during British colonial rule on 2 October 1935. He was one of eight children in his family. Tang attended Ching Primary School in 1949. Tang enrolled in The Chinese High School in 1951. He would later study at Nanyang University in 1962 before moving to the University of Singapore to study law the following year. He graduated in 1967 and joined the bar a year later at the age of 33.

== Career ==
Tang opened a law firm in 1968.

Tang served for several years as the chairman of the Nanyang Fine Arts Foundation, and also sat on the board of management of The Chinese High School. He was also part of the management committee for Hwa Chong Junior College and River Valley High School.

In 1991, Tang was part of the 18 founding members of a group to promote Chinese language and culture among Chinese Singaporeans. Among the founding members were a former Singapore Chinese Chamber of Commerce and Industry president, retired academics Wu Teh Yao and Lau Wai Har, Chinese-language writer and Cultural Medallion recipient Wong Meng Voon. The group was formed after Member of Parliament (MP) for Leng Kee Single Member Constituency, Ow Chin Hock, asked the Chinese community to form a committee and report on the future of the Chinese community. The group would later submit a memorandum to prime minister Goh Chok Tong with recommendations for the new streaming system for primary school students, on how English and Chinese should be taught, to be implemented in 1992.

=== Political career ===
In 1992, Tang was nominated to be a Nominated Member of Parliament (NMP) by the Chinese community but was not chosen by the government. Prime minister Goh said that the NMP scheme was not for representation for ethnic or linguistic lines and that the group representation constituency (GRC) system ensured representation of the minority groups.

During the 1997 general election, Tang, alongside WP's leader J. B. Jeyaretnam, as part of a five-member team contested Cheng San GRC. Tang came under fire from the PAP after he raised the issue of the Hotel Properties Limited apartment sales in 1995 during the election campaign. This issue arose after the Stock Exchange of Singapore had previously criticised Hotel Properties Ltd for its "tardiness" in disclosing details of sales of its condominium units to directors and their family members, which included senior minister Lee Kuan Yew, who had purchased a unit and whose brother was a director of the company.

On polling day, the WP's team in Cheng San GRC lost to the PAP's team by 44,132 votes (45.18%) to 53,553 (54.82%). This was the highest percentage of the vote garnered by any opposition losing candidates, and was therefore enough to secure one of the team's members a seat as a Non-Constituency Member of Parliament (NCMP). The party selected Jeyaretnam to become its NCMP.

In 2003, Tang and Zulfikar Mohamad Shariff formed an organisation, Association for Democracy in Singapore, in New South Wales, Australia. Former GRC teammate Jeyaretnam and Singapore Democratic Party's secretary general Chee Soon Juan also joined the organisation.

== Defamation suits ==
In a 1996 interview with Hong Kong-based magazine Yazhou Zhoukan, opposition politician and lawyer Tang Liang Hong opined that "professional bodies" such as the Commercial Affairs Department or the Corrupt Practices Investigation Bureau ought to have handled the investigation of the Senior Minister (SM) Lee Kuan Yew and his son Deputy Prime Minister Lee Hsien Loong property purchases. Tang made similar claims regarding the Lees' transactions with HPL at three Workers' Party rallies on 31 December 1996.

The Lees subsequently sued Tang for libel. Tang was represented by his law firm, Tang & Co while the Lees were represented by Lee & Lee. In November, Tang applied for Queen's Counsel (QC) Charles Gray to represent him which was approved as nine lawyers had rejected his request to be his representation. The Lees also applied for representation by a QC. In January 1997, the Lees applied for the Mareva injunction against Tang and High Court judge Lai Kew Chai ruled that worldwide assets belonging to Tang and his wife (valued at S$11.2 million) were to be frozen. Tang, who was represented by J. B. Jeyaretnam, unsuccessfully sought to disqualify Lai by claiming that Lai was "close" to the plaintiffs. Tang further alleged that Lai had a "pecuniary interest" in the case because he had also purchased a discounted unit at Nassim Jade on the same day as the Lees. Lai countered that he had done so "separately and independently". In May 1997, judge Chao Hick Tin ruled that Tang's comments constituted "extreme aggravation" and awarded Lee Kuan Yew and Lee Hsien Loong S$1.05 million and S$950,000 in respective damages.

After the 1997 election, Tang was also sued for defamation by 11 PAP politicians, including Goh, SM Lee, and deputy prime ministers Lee and Tony Tan, who accused him of making statements during the campaign which falsely questioned their integrity. A total of 13 judgements were entered against Tang for defamation. Tang also subsequently faced charges from the Inland Revenue Department for evading taxes.

After Tang left Singapore, he did not return for the hearings of the defamation suits and had also sacked his lawyers. When Tang failed to file an affidavit disclosing his assets, the plaintiffs obtained default judgements against Tang in all their suits. Damages were assessed by a judge of the High Court at a total of S$739,976. The High Court also declared Tang as bankrupt. Tang was eventually ordered to pay a total of S$7.175 million for the defamation suits. Yazhou Zhoukan, which was involved in the first set of defamation suits, was ordered to pay S$900,000 in damages.

In September, Tang appealed against the damages awarded by the High Court and was represented by Grey again. In November, the Court of Appeal reduced the original total amount from S$7.175 million to $3.63 million. As Yazhou Zhoukan had already paid the damages, the court did not consider a reduction in amount for it.

== Personal life and death ==
Three days after 1997 general election, Tang left Singapore for Johor, Malaysia, fearing that he could be arrested by the Internal Security Department after being branded as a Chinese chauvinist. His wife Teo Siew Har's passport was then impounded but later released. Eventually Tang moved to Australia, where he was reunited with his wife.

Tang lived in Australia and then Malaysia until his death in Hong Kong on 15 September 2025, at the age of 89. His wife Teo died in May 2019, and he was survived by three children; one son and two daughters. (Note: Sources mislabel his age as "90".) His death was only made known on 2 October following an obituary in The Straits Times.
