= N. Ganesan =

Nadesan Ganesan PBM
- Born: Nadesapillai Ganesan. 31 October 1932; Singapore, Tank Road.
- Died: 1 July 2015 (aged 82); Singapore
- Occupation(s): Criminal Litigator(Lawyer), former public prosecutor and district judge.
- Title: FAS chairman.
- Term: 1976–1982
- Predecessor: R.B.I. Pates
- Successor: Teo Chong Tee

Nadesan Ganesan, PBM (31 October 1932 – 1 July 2015) was a chairman of the Football Association of Singapore. He served as FAS vice-chairman for two years before he was appointed chairman on 31 March 1976, and was a vice-president of the Asian Football Confederation. He stepped down as FAS chairman in 1982. He was a criminal lawyer by trade.

== Early life ==
Ganesan was born in Tank Road, Singapore to Tamil parents from Madurai, the youngest of five children. Abandoned by their father, the children were brought up by their mother. After the war, he studied at Victoria School and later at Anglo-Chinese School. He later did his bar exams at Inner Temple, London and received his LLB at the University of London. His mother died whilst he was taking his final exams in London. Upon his return to Singapore he became a successful criminal litigator, deputy public prosecutor and district judge.

He was also an avid reader and supporter of the arts in Singapore and contributed by teaching Literature classes later in life at the National University of Singapore.

== Football career ==
Ganesan was responsible for changing the Malaysia Cup venue from the Jalan Besar Stadium to the 55,000 capacity National Stadium. He also revamped the local leagues and their 118 teams into the 30-team National Football League.

Ganesan was also a staunch supporter of coach Choo Seng Quee, whom he brought in as national coach after he became the chairman of the FAS. Choo subsequently led Singapore to a Malaysia Cup title in 1977, twelve years after the team last won the competition.

Ganesan fought for the Pre-World Cup tournament to be held in Singapore's National Stadium in 1977. Singapore finished second in the group but lost to Hong Kong in the play-off final.

The Lion City Cup was founded by Ganesan in 1977 as the first Under-16 tournament in the world. The tournament would serve as inspiration for FIFA to introduce the FIFA U-16 World Championship in 1985.

Ganesan was awarded the Pingat Bakti Masyarakat medal in 1978 for his services to Singapore football.

== Personal life ==
Ganesan's niece, Madhavi Krishnan is famed classical Bharatanatyam dancer and ex-Indian film actress and the first female recipient of Singapore's Cultural Medallion in 1979.

Ganesan was divorced twice.

Ganesan suffered a stroke in 2011 and moved to a nursing home where he stayed until his death on 1 July 2015 aged 82.
