= Chao Ji =

Chao Ji, Chaoji, or, variant, may refer to:

== People and characters ==
=== Given name "Chao-ji" ===
- Tay Teow Kiat (simplified Chinese: 郑朝吉; traditional Chinese: 鄭朝吉; pinyin: Zhèng Cháojí; born 1947), Chinese Singaporean musician

Characters

- Chaoji Han (チャオジー・ハン), a fictional character from D-gray Man

=== Given name "Chao" surname "Ji" ===
- Ji Chao (纪超; born 1991), Chinese soccer player

== Standards ==
- ChaoJi, an electric car charging standard for East Asia, developed in China and Japan to replace GB/T and CHAdeMO respectively
- Chaoji (超级), a variant of VCD and Super Video CD
- "Chao ji", a type of token currency once used in China; see Chinese token (alternative currency)

== Other uses ==
- Chaoji, the dawn sacrifice in Manchu shamanism

== See also ==
- Chao (disambiguation)
- Ji (disambiguation)
