= Nganasan =

Nganasan may refer to:

- Nganasan people, an indigenous people of the Russian Far North
- Nganasan language

== See also ==
- N. Ganesan (1932–2015), chairman of the Football Association of Singapore
