= Kam Ning =

Singaporean violinist

- Origin: Singapore
- Genre: Classical
- Occupation: violinist
- Instrument: Violin
- Website: http://www.ningkam.com

Kam Ning (Chinese: 甘寧) is a violinist and daughter of the violinist-composer Kam Kee Yong, and grandchild of Kam Beng Soo and Ooi Kooi Aun.

== Early life and education ==
Born in Singapore in 1975, Kam was given violin lessons at the age of six by the elder Kam. She studied in Methodist Girls' School.

In 1987, Kam received scholarships from the Lee Foundation and Shaw Foundation to study in the Yehudi Menuhin School, where she attended lessons and masterclasses conducted by Lord Menuhin himself and collaborated with him in chamber and orchestral performances at the age of 11. In her second year at the school, she played at the Royal Festival Hall with the Wren Orchestra of London, and her debut performance to a packed Victoria Concert Hall in Singapore. In 1993, Kam furthered her music education at the Curtis Institute of Music to study with Jaime Laredo and Yumi Scott and received her bachelor's degree there. She graduated from the Cleveland Institute of Music with a Masters of Music Degree and an Artist Diploma in 2001, under the tutelage of Donald Weilerstein.

== Career ==
The young Kam appeared in an episode of the popular British television programme Blue Peter when she was twelve, playing Paganini's Caprice No.5 in a segment featuring students from the Yehudi Menuhin School.

Kam Ning has since performed with many world-class orchestras like the Royal Liverpool Philharmonic, the National Orchestra of Belgium, the Singapore Symphony Orchestra, the City of London Sinfonia and the Luxembourg Philharmonic, Malaysian Philharmonic, Helsinki Philharmonic, and Toronto Symphony, just to name a few. In her performance with the Orchestra della Svizzera Italiana under Menuhin in Switzerland in 1991, she was praised by critics as a "brilliant young violinist from Singapore" for her outstanding performance of Mendelssohn's E-minor Violin Concerto. As an artist who is keen on venturing off the beaten path, she has collaborated with her brother, percussionist Francis Kam, on concert tours in Taiwan, featuring contemporary music including works by their father, Kam Kee Yong.

== Accolades ==
In 1990, Kam received the Outstanding Young Artist of the Competition prize in the Royal Over-Seas League Music Competition in Britain and in 1991, she won first prize in the Junior Section of the Folkestone Menuhin International Violin Competition, in Britain. She was awarded theYoung Artist Award by the National Arts Council in 2000. In 2001, her performance took the second place Prix du Gouvernement Fédérale Belge Eugéne Ysaye in the Queen Elisabeth Music Competition in Belgium in 2001.

== Personal life ==
Kam Ning counts her father Kam Kee Yong, and mentor Yehudi Menuhin as her most important sources of influence. To her, Menuhin remains "the most imaginative man she has ever met" for his repertoire in violin-playing. Her father's strict teaching instilled a sense of discipline in her, as he set high expectations from her.
