= Max Le Blond =

Singaporean theatre director and academic

Max Le Blond (born 1950) is a Singaporean theatre director and academic. He was awarded the Cultural Medallion for Theatre in 1987.

== Early life and education ==
Le Blond was born in Singapore in 1950. He studied at St. Joseph's Institution, and joined the school's debate team and drama club. He placed second in the Rotary Elocution Contest and reached the finals of the Singapore Safety Council Third Annual Oratorical Contest in 1965. In 1969, he began his undergraduate studies at the University of Singapore where he met prominent theatre director Chandran K. Lingam, who inspired Le Blond to focus on theatre. From 1969 to 1973, he received the Bursary Award of the Christian Brothers' Old Boys' Association. While he was acting in Lingam's play Kismet, Lingam fell ill and asked for him to act as an assistant director. He was named Best Speaker at the 1972 Intervarsity School Debate. In 1974, he acted in the Robert Yeo play Are You There, Singapore?. Le Blond furthered his education at the University of Birmingham. He gained his doctorate from the university in 1978.

In 2000, he graduated from the University of Washington School of Law with a Juris Doctor. In 2005, he graduated from the Macquarie University with a Graduate Diploma in Education.

== Career ==
From 1978 to 1982, he was a senior tutor at the Department of English Language and Literature of the University of Singapore. In 1980, he directed the Robert Yeo play One Year Back Home. In 1981, he directed and produced the play Nurse Angamuthu's Romance, which was an adaptation of the Peter Nichols play The National Health. He also delivered a speech at the Conference on English Language and Literature in Singapore. In the following year, he directed The Samseng and the Chettiar’s Daughter, which was an adaptation of John Gay's The Beggar’s Opera. He also co-directed the David Henry Hwang play FOB, and directed an adaptation of the Mark Leib play Terry Rex. From 1982 to 1988, he served as a lecturer at the Department of English Language and Literature of the University of Singapore. In 1983, he directed African Double, which was adapted from the Athol Fugard plays The Island and Sizwe Banzi Is Dead.

In 1985, he directed the Stella Kon play Emily of Emerald Hill, which became his best known work. The one-woman play revolves around Emily Gan, a Peranakan matriarch portrayed by actress Margaret Chan. Le Blond also directed the play at its stagings at the Commonwealth Arts Festival and the Edinburgh Festival Fringe in the following year. The play also inspired the formation of several English-language theatre companies in Singapore, including ACT 3 Theatrics, TheatreWorks and The Necessary Stage. In 1987, he was awarded the Cultural Medallion for his contributions to theatre in Singapore. In 1988, he directed the Eleanor Wong play Peter's Passionate Pursuit. From 1988 to 1992, he served as a senior lecturer at the Department of English Language and Literature of the University of Singapore.

In 1990, Le Blond directed the Eugene O'Neill play Long Day's Journey into Night. He also served as the chairman of the Drama Sub-committee of the Advisory Council on Culture and the Arts, the Chief Judge of the Drama Section of the Awards Committee of the National Book Development Council of Singapore and a consultant and associated editor of the Editorial Panel of ASEAN Anthology of Drama. He was the editor of Modern ASEAN Plays: Singapore, which was published in 1991. From 1991 to 1997, he served as the Arts Advisor to The Substation. In 1992, he served as a member of the Arts Resource Panel of the National Arts Council. From 1992 to 1997, he was a senior lecturer at the Division of Literature and Drama of the School of Arts of the National Institute of Education. From 1993 to 1994, he also served as a coordinator at the school. In 1995, he directed an adaptation of "Master Harold"...and the Boys in October 1995.

Le Blond is currently a practising lawyer and part-time English Literature teacher in Sydney, Australia.

== Personal life ==
Le Blond currently resides in Sydney with his family.
