= Joanna Wong Quee Heng =

Singaporean singer of Chinese opera (born 1939)

- 胡桂馨
- Born: 29 January 1939 (age 87); Penang
- Education: National University of Singapore 1963
- Occupation: Chinese opera singer
- Spouse: Huang Shiying (Leslie Wong)
- Children: 2

Joanna Wong Quee Heng (born 29 January 1939; Chinese: 胡桂馨; pinyin: Hú Guìxīn) is a Chinese opera singer, actress and director from Singapore. In 1981 she received a Cultural Medallion for Theatre, becoming the first Chinese opera performer to receive the award.

== Biography ==
Wong was born in Singapore and grew up in Penang, Malaysia, where her aunt regularly took her to see Cantonese opera performances. As a teenager, she joined an opera society and began to learn the art. In 1959 she moved back to Singapore to study chemistry at the then University of Malaya, graduating with an honors degree in 1963 from the newly renamed National University of Singapore. After graduation, she worked as an administrator at the university. In 1965 she became assistant registrar, in 1975 she became deputy registrar and from 1977 to 1980 she was seconded to Nanyang University to serve as registrar. From 1996 to 2001 she was registrar of the National University of Singapore.

While a university student, she worked on and performed in operatic productions, and she began performing Chinese opera professionally in Singapore in 1967.

In 1981, Wong and her husband Leslie founded Chinese Theatre Circle to preserve and promote the traditional Chinese performing arts of opera, dance and music.

Wong has served on a number of committees and boards including the National Theatre Trust and Ministry of Health, the Cultural Medallion Awards Advisory Panel, People's Association Women's Executive Committee Coordinating Council, and the National Sports Carnival for Women. In 1974, she received the Public Service Star for her community service.

=== Personal life ===
Wong married Huang Shiying (Leslie Wong) in 1965. They have two daughters.

== Bibliography ==
- Choo, Mui Eng (2020). Her opera, her life - Joanna = Ta de xi qu, ta de yi sheng - Hu Guixin. Ee Kiam Chua. Singapore. ISBN 978-981-14-4328-2. OCLC 1164741498.
