= Phoon Yew Tien =

Phoon Yew Tien (Note: Chinese: 潘耀田; pinyin: Pān Yàotián) (born 21 August 1952) is a Singaporean composer. He received the Cultural Medallion in 1996, and is the most recorded composer in Singapore.

== Early life and education ==
Phoon was born in Singapore on 21 August 1952. His father was a signboard painter. As a child, he would frequently listening to mandarin songs on the radio. He studied at River Valley Primary School, and later at Queensway Secondary School. While he was studying at the school, he joined its Chinese orchestra, playing the dizi. He joined the National Theatre Chinese Orchestra in 1968, and was later selected to join the Singapore National Youth Chinese Orchestra. He was selected to represent Singapore at the 1970 International Festival of Youth Orchestras, which was held in Lucerne. From 1970 to 1973, he was a Sectional Leader in the National Theatre Chinese Orchestra and a Deputy Leader in the Singapore Youth Chinese Orchestra. From 1974 to 1979, he was a member of the Singapore Chinese Orchestra.

After returning from Europe, he took up the piano and the flute. He managed to attain a Grade 8 in piano, flute and music theory from ABRSM. After receiving a tutelage from composer Leong Yoon Pin, he began composing his own music. He won the distinguished prize of the National Songwriting Competition from 1977 to 1979.

In 1980, Phoon won the Singapore Symphony Orchestra scholarship to study flute at the Queensland Conservatorium of Music in Brisbane. While studying, he was encouraged to change course to study composition by his teacher Elaine Dobson. Due to the scholarship, Phoon could not change course so he took up an additional course in composition. He won the Dulcie Robertson Prize for best composition in 1980, 1981 and 1983. In 1983, he graduated from the university with a Bachelor of Music in Composition and Flute.

== Career ==
In 1984, Phoon received the Yoshirō Irino Memorial Prize for Composition from the Asian Composers' League, and his symphonic work, Ping Diao, was premiered by the Singapore Symphony Orchestra. In the same year, he was commissioned by the National Arts Council to compose full-length Incidental music for the play Oolah World. From 1984 to 1992, he was an Assistant Conductor in the Singapore Chinese Orchestra. From 1984 to 1999, he served as a lecturer in the Music Department of the Nanyang Academy of Fine Arts. He has also regularly participated in the Singapore International Festival of Arts since 1984. In 1985, he composed music for the dance performance Tang Huang and the play Kopi Tiam. In the same year, his symphonic piece Variations on Dayung Sampan was premiered by the Singapore Symphony Orchestra. From 1986 to 1994, he was a member of PRS for Music. Beginning in 1987, his compositions and arrangements have been performed by various orchestras across Asia, including the Singapore Symphony Orchestra and the Singapore Chinese Orchestra in Singapore, the Shanghai Philharmonic Orchestra, the Shanghai Music Conservatory Symphony, and the Shanghai Music Conservatory Chinese Orchestra in China, the Hong Kong Chinese Orchestra in Hong Kong and the Kaohsiung City Symphony Orchestra in Taiwan. In the same year, his chamber piece Meditation of a Poet, was premiered by the Singapore Symphony Orchestra.

In 1988, Phoon composed music for the dance performance Nu Wa. In the same year, his chamber piece Variants on Kuan San Yue was premiered by the Singapore Symphony Orchestra. From 1988 to 1997, he was a member of the Advisory Council on Culture and the Arts of the National Arts Council. He composed music for the play Lao Jiu in 1990. From 1990 to 1992, he served as an Associate Conductor in the Singapore Chinese Orchestra. In 1993, he composed music for the dance performance The Homing Fish. From 1993 to 1996, he served as the Head of Music at the Nanyang Academy of Fine Arts. In 1995, he composed music for the play Descendants of the Eunuch Admiral. In the same year, he became a member of the Composers and Authors Society of Singapore.

In 1996, Phoon was awarded the Cultural Medallion for Music. He was also awarded the Local Serious Music Award in the same year and also in 1997, 2001, 2004 and 2012. In 1997, he composed music for the television drama Grandpa's Meat Bone Tea. From 1998 to 2008, he served as an Arts Advisor to the National Arts Council. In 2000, at the request of the Singaporean government, he rearranged Majulah Singapura, the national anthem of Singapore. In the same year, the Singapore Symphony Orchestra premiered his Variants on an Ancient Tune. In 2003, he served as the composer-in-residence of the Singapore Symphony Orchestra. His piece Memories, was also commissioned and premiered by the orchestra. In the following year, the Hong Kong Chinese Orchestra commissioned and premiered his piece Jatinder's China Dream. In 2005, his orchestral piece was commissioned and premiered by the Singapore Symphony Orchestra. In 2008, he served as a judge for the ASEAN Anthem Competition. In 2009, he received the Composers and Authors Society's Meritorious Award.

== Personal life ==
Phoon is married to Phoon Soh Wah.
