= Margaret Leng Tan =

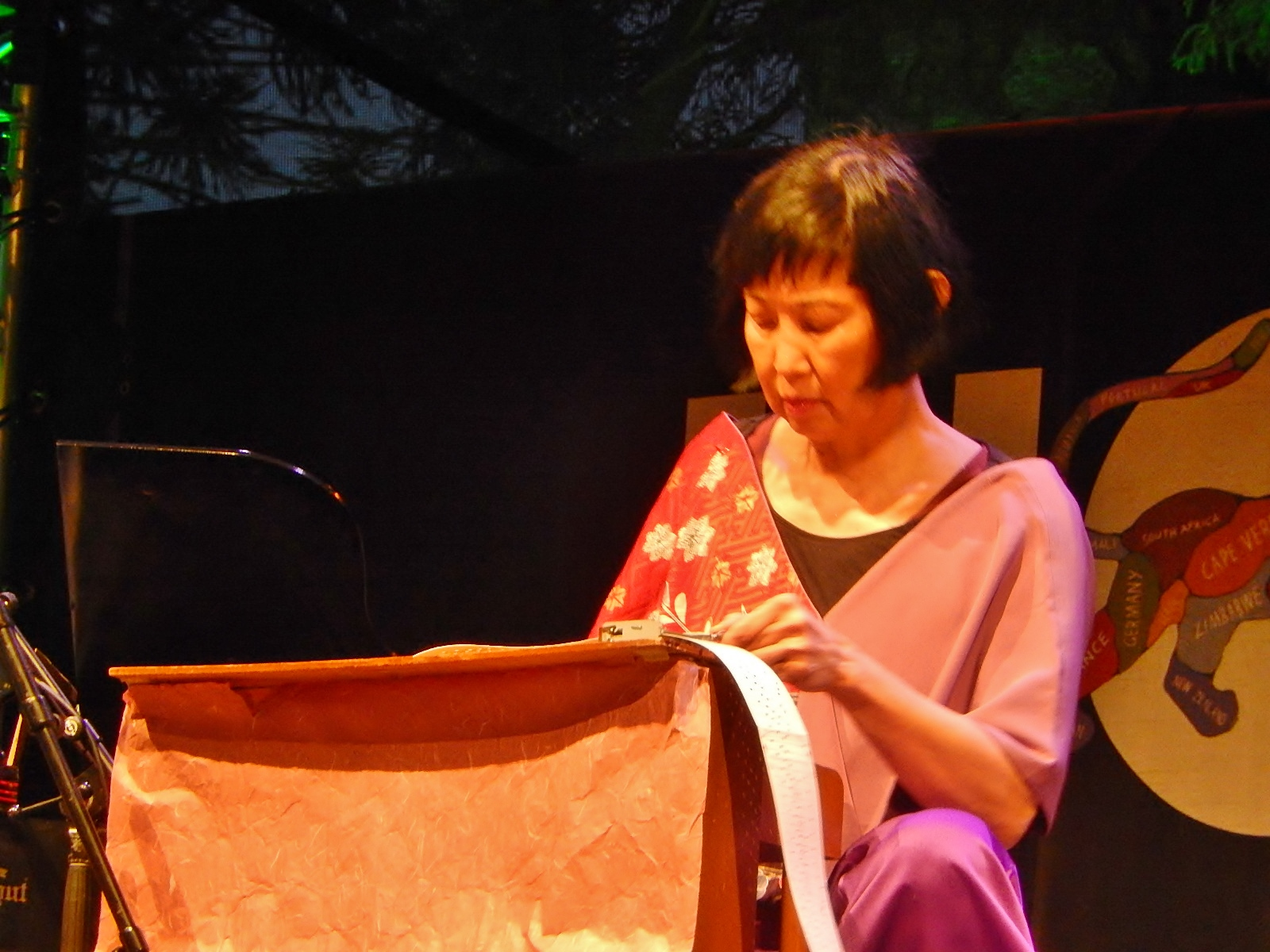
- Tan performing on toy piano in 2015

Background information
- Born: Margaret Tan Hee Leng; 1945 (age 79–80); Canada
- Genres: Classical
- Occupation(s): Pianist, Toy pianist
- Instrument(s): piano toy piano

Margaret Leng Tan (simplified Chinese: 陈灵; traditional Chinese: 陳靈; pinyin: Chén Líng) is a classical music artist known for her work as a professional toy pianist, performing in major cities around the world on her 51 cm-high toy pianos. She is also known to be a classical music performer using unconventional instruments like toy drums, soy sauce dishes, and cat-food cans.

== Early life and education ==
Tan was born in Singapore on 12 December 1945, the daughter of former Straits Times Press chairman Tan Chye Cheng, and started taking music lessons at the age of six. In 1961 the young Tan took first place in the Singapore-Malaysia annual piano competition, and won a scholarship to study at The Juilliard School at age 16 in the following year. In 1971 she became the first woman to earn a Doctorate in Musical Arts at Juilliard, and became the diva of the prepared piano, inserting nuts and bolts into the instrument and playing it inside out to rave reviews.

== Musical career ==
In 1981 Tan met John Cage, and since then they continued to work together for the last 11 years of his life. In 1984 she was awarded a US National Endowment for the Arts grant. Between 1990 and 1991 she gave retrospective concerts of Cage's music in collaboration with artist Jasper Johns. Since then she has since been hailed as "the leading exponent of Cage's music today" (The New Republic) and "the most convincing interpreter of John Cage’s keyboard music" (The New York Times). She performed Cage’s music throughout North America, Europe and Asia and in the PBS "American Masters" films on John Cage and Jasper Johns. The association with Cage also led to her enchantment with the toy piano. She made her debut on the instrument in 1993 at New York’s Lincoln Center, playing Cage's 1948 Suite for Toy Piano. Since finding this first toy piano, she continued to acquire many others, including a 37-key Schoenhut toy grand piano. She continues to, in her own words, "remain wholeheartedly intrigued by the toy piano's magical overtones, hypnotic charm, and not least, its off-key poignancy."

It was in 1993 at a thrift store in the East Village in New York Tan bought her first toy piano which cost a mere US$45. The 45-cm-high, two-octave little toy thus became her instrument to deliver the 1948 Toy Piano Suite, and her first love to toy pianos. She recorded her groundbreaking album, The Art of the Toy Piano, on Point/Polygram in 1997. In 2002 the pianist performed in Berlin on 9 March, and in New York for a separate celebration of both John Cage and composer Morton Feldman on 13 April. In that same year Tan made history as the first Singapore-born musician to play in the Isaac Stern Auditorium of the Carnegie Hall on 14 April 2002, and performed Cage's Concerto for Prepared Piano and Chamber Orchestra with the American Composers Orchestra.

Tan was also featured playing Cage's 4'33" on her toy piano in the Singapore documentary Singapore GaGa by Singaporean film-maker Tan Pin Pin. She is also never far from her toy pianos, and with a fair share of tickling stories on her travels with them. In 2001, when she was invited to perform in an abbey in Provence, France the technical staff advised her to store her toy piano away to prevent bat droppings from landing on her precious piano. In the end her piano was placed under the grand piano; this arrangement of a little piano underneath a big one reminded Tan of Matroska dolls. In another occasion, she remembered a funny sight when she carried her piano on board the plane, and had it strapped to a seat next to her.

Evans Chan's 2004 documentary, Sorceress of the New Piano: The Artistry of Margaret Leng Tan, has been invited to numerous international film festivals including Vancouver, Melbourne and AFI/Discovery Channel's SILVERDOCS, where it was nominated for Best Music Documentary. Sorceress and Chan's The Maverick Piano, which features live performances by Tan, are available as a Mode Records DVD.

Tan is the featured performer for "Inside the Piano" on the Treasures of The New York Public Library Video Series.

== Awards ==
In 2014, Tan was inducted in the Singapore Women's Hall of Fame.

In 2015, Tan was awarded the Cultural Medallion of Singapore by Tony Tan, President of Singapore.

== Personal life ==
Tan resides in Brooklyn, New York and had collected 18 toy pianos.

== Discography ==
- Somei Satoh: Litania New Albion (1988)
- Sonic Encounters - The New Piano Mode Records (1988)
- Cage: The Perilous Night, Four Walls New Albion (1990)
- Cage: Daughters of the Lonesome Isle New Albion (1994)
- Milos Raickovich New Classicism Mode Records (1995)
- The Art of the Toy Piano Point Music/Universal (1997)
- Cage: The Seasons ECM New Series (2000)
- Cage The Works for Piano 4 Mode Records (2002)
- George Crumb: Makrokosmos I and II Mode Records (2004)
- Ge Gan-ru: Polish Rhapsody BIS (2005)
- Cage The Works for Piano 7 Mode Records (2006)
- Ge Gan-ru: Lost Style New Albion (2007)
- She Herself Alone, The Art of the Toy Piano 2 Mode Records (2010)
- George Crumb: Metamorphoses (Book I), Five Pieces for Piano Mode Records (2018)
