= Han Lao Da =

Singaporean playwright (born 1947)

- 韩劳达
- Born: Ann Jong Juan; Chinese: 韩永元 pinyin: Hán Yǒngyuán; 22 October 1947 (age 79); Singapore
- Other names: Tan Tian; Chinese: 谭天 pinyin: Tán Tiān Hai Shu; Chinese: 海叔 pinyin: Hǎi Shū
- Occupations: Principal, Han Language Centre
- Spouse: Koh Hwee Peck
- Children: Ann Yong He; Ann Yun Guang
- Website: Han Language Centre

Han Lao Da (Chinese: 韩劳达; pinyin: Hán Láodá), originally named Ann Jong Juan, is a Singaporean playwright, as well as founder and principal of Han Language Centre. Han received the Cultural Medallion for his contributions in the Singaporean drama scene, and is also recognised for his xiangsheng contributions in Singapore.

== Early life and education ==
Han was born in Singapore with his ancestral roots in Wenchang, Hainan, China.

== Arts career ==
Han started composing xiangsheng plays since the 1970s, and he started studying the works of renowned xiangsheng artist Ma Ji . Han's debut play was entitled The gift ticket. The play was performed in Singapore and major towns and cities all over peninsula Malaysia. In 1984, Han got to befriend Ma Ji, and in 1986, Han also befriended noted performers like Jiang Kun and Tang Jie Zhong. After making these acquaintances, Han began to absorb all the artistic knowledge he can from these noted xiangsheng performers so that he could bring the art of xiangsheng to Singapore, and promote the local xiangsheng culture. He worked hard with other xiangsheng enthusiasts, and produced many scripts for local performances. His works garnered many local awards and won many xiangsheng competitions. He also published three xiangsheng collections and critiques containing a total of 45 xiangsheng scripts. In 2000, his article introducing Singaporean xiangsheng was published in the column on xiangsheng history, published in the Chinese Xiangsheng Network.

At the same time, Han is a noted playwright active in the Singaporean drama scene. He has written a total of nine full-length drama and many short plays.

== Business career ==
In 1993, Han founded Han Language Centre.

== Awards ==
- 1990: Cultural Medallion (Theatre), by the National Arts Council Singapore
- 1994: National Book award, by the Singapore Federation of Chinese Clan Associations
- 1995: Broadcast award, by the China Federation of Literary and Art Circles
- 2017: Singapore Chinese Cultural Contribution Award by Singapore Chinese Cultural Centre

== Published works ==
- Tan, Tian (1984). Tan Tian Xiangsheng Collection. Singapore: Wen xue shu wu. ISBN 9971-975-01-7.
- Han, Lao Da (1986). The Drama of Lao Da. Singapore: Singapore chao zhou ba yi hui guan wen jiao wei yuan hui chu ban zu. ISBN 9971-9924-7-7.
- Tan, Tian (1988). Tan Tian Xiangsheng Collection II. Singapore: Southern Arts Society. Singapore National Library (Call Number Chinese 792.2028 TT)
- Han, Lao Da (1991). Chen jia geng : ba chang hua ju. Singapore: The Chinese High School. ISBN 981-00-3255-2.
- Han, Lao Da (1991). Xinbu zouguo: 80 niandai Xinjiapo Huaya ju tan [Strolling through – the Singapore Chinese drama scene in the 1980s] (in Chinese). Singapore: Southern Arts Society. OCLC 39688689.
- Hai, Shu (1994). The story of the Merlion – Part I. Singapore: Singapore Federation of Chinese Clan Associations. ISBN 981-00-4825-4.
- Hai, Shu (1994). The story of the Merlion – Part II. Singapore: Singapore Federation of Chinese Clan Associations. ISBN 981-00-5208-1.
- Hai, Shu (1994). The story of the Merlion – Part III. Singapore: Singapore Federation of Chinese Clan Associations. ISBN 981-00-5209-X.
- Hai, Shu (1994). The story of the Merlion – Part IV. Singapore: Singapore Federation of Chinese Clan Associations. ISBN 981-00-5210-3.
- Hai, Shu (1994). The story of the Merlion – Part V. Singapore: Singapore Federation of Chinese Clan Associations. ISBN 981-00-5211-1.
- Han, Lao Da (2000). Lao Da Xiangsheng Collection III. Singapore: Singapore Asian Publications (S) Pte Ltd. ISBN 981-225-943-0.
- Han, Lao Da (2002). Interesting Conversation in Chinese. Singapore: Singapore Asian Publications (S) Pte Ltd. ISBN 981-4082-82-1.
- Han, Lao Da (2004). Lao Da School Xiangsheng Collection. Singapore: Singapore Asian Publications (S) Pte Ltd. ISBN 981-255-230-8.

== Plays that have been performed but not published ==
=== Full-length drama ===
- The sisters Jin and Yin
- The Door
- The five Libra
- The Soaring heights
- The Teochew Kangaroo
- Yelin School

=== Short plays ===
- What time is it?
- Aliens
- The Call
- Face
