= K. T. M. Iqbal =

Singaporean poet and essayist

Mohamed Iqbal (born in 1940), better known as K. T. M. Iqbal, is a Singaporean poet and essayist. He was awarded the Cultural Medallion in 2014.

== Early life and education ==
Iqbal was born in Kadayanallur, India in 1940. He and his father left for Singapore in 1951 after his mother and his three younger brothers died from cholera. He then began attending the Umar Pulavar Tamil School on Maxwell Road. He began writing poems in 1957. After his graduation, he was employed at Gattey & Bateman, an auditor's firm. When he turned 22, his father arranged for him to be married. He began attending evening classes at the Cantonment Road Primary School in 1963. He began attending Gan Eng Seng Secondary School the following year.

== Career ==
After graduating, he returned to Gattey & Bateman, which had been renamed to Coopers & Lybrand, as a clerk. A few years later, he left the firm to become a share registration officer at Singapore International Merchant Bankers Limited. In 1971, he began as a freelance songwriter for the Tamil-language Radio Singapore Children's music programme Let Us Sing. By the time he had stopped working for Radio Singapore in 1989, he had written over 200 songs for the programme. In 1975, Flowers of the Heart, a collection of his poems, was published. His second poetry collection, Mother, was published in 1984. His third, Addresses, was published in 1990. In 1995, his poem Water was selected for display in MRT trains by the National Arts Council.

In 1996, he won the Tamil category of the Montblanc-NUS Centre for the Arts Literary Award. In 1999, he won the Tamizhavel Award of the Association of Singapore Tamil Writers. His fourth poetry collection, Dreams, was published in 2000. In the same year, he served as the editor of the poetry anthology Rhythms, and Water was selected for display at the Expo 2000 at the Goethe Institute in Hanover. He received the S.E.A. Write Award in 2001. His fifth poetry collection, Fragrance of Paper, was published in 2003. His sixth poetry collection, Angels Are On The Earth, was published in 2005. In the same year, he received the Kala Ratna Award from the Singapore Indian Fine Arts Society. A poetry collection which included the English translation of his poems, The Evening Number and other Poems, was published in 2008. In 2009, he served as the associate editor of the poetry anthology Fifty on 50. In 2014, Iqbal received the Cultural Medallion. He was among the various writers featured at the 2015 Singapore Writers Festival.
