= M. Balakrishnan =

Singaporean author

Mayandiambalam Balakrishnan (commonly known as M. Balakrishnan) (born 18 September 1938) is a Singaporean author, popularly known by his pen name Ma Ilangkannan. He was the first Tamil writer to receive the South East Asian Writers Award in 1982. He was awared the Cultural Medallion in 2005.

== Early life and education ==
M. Balakrishnan in short, was born in Singapore in 1938, the eldest of three children. His family moved to Tamil Nadu State in India when he was two years old, from where, he learnt to read and write Tamil. After World War II, he returned to Singapore and continued his studies at Kalaimagal Tamil School. His family had to shift between rented houses and the uncertainty disrupted his education. Balakrishnan studied till Standard Eight and left school to help support his family by working as an office boy in the British Army. Balakrishnan continued to study in night school to pick up English and wrote for the school magazine, and short stories and articles for the Tamil newspapers.

Though his school education was hindered by circumstances, he was an avid reader of Tamil magazines and newspapers.

== Career ==
In 1964, Balakrishnan started a montly magazine Thondan (Volunteer) with local poet Paranan. The magazine lasted two issues before they stopped publication. Balakrishnan continued to work at the British Army and left it after working there for 10 years. In 1966, he became a typist with the Ministry of Culture, where he worked until 1997.

In 2005, Balakrishnan was awarded the Cultural Medallion.
