= Yip Cheong Fun =

Singaporean photographer (1903–1989)

- Born: 1903; British Hong Kong
- Died: 16 September 1989 (aged 85–86); Singapore
- Known for: Documentary photography
- Style: Portrait

Yip Cheong Fun (Chinese: 叶畅芬; pinyin: Yè Chàngfēn; 1903 – 16 September 1989) was an influential Singaporean documentary photographer, best known for his photograph "Rowing at Dawn", which was taken in 1957 in celebration of Singapore obtaining self-government, and which in his words, was to show "the dawn of a new day, new hope and new life for Singapore".

Although better known and admired for his seascapes, Yip Cheong Fun also took a lot of other award-winning photographs depicting different facets of Singaporeans' life with keen observation and a humanistic understanding of the people and events around him. In 1984 he was awarded the Cultural Medallion for his outstanding achievements and contributions to photography, for his work "identified with the Singaporean society and mirrored the nation's way of life and history".

== Biography ==
Born in Hong Kong in 1903, Yip arrived in Singapore with his migrant parents when he was seven months old. His father died when Yip was four, and his mother then had to find work to support herself and her son. But times were bad and, finding it difficult to earn a livelihood, she sent her six-year-old son to Dongguan, China, where relatives could look after him. However, the relatives were uncaring and Yip was neglected in the subsequent four years. Some kind-hearted neighbours at the house in Gongchai Street in Chashan, Dongguan, found the child starving and sick. They fed him for a while and contacted his mother in Singapore to inform her about the boy's condition. He was then brought back to Singapore, where he stayed with his mother at Sago Lane in Singapore's Chinatown. Later, he studied at a private school in Chinatown.

Yip began working as a mechanic in his younger days and later joined United Engineers as a technician and engineering supervisor. He resigned from United Engineers in 1943 when he discovered the firm was manufacturing arms for the Japanese military. He then started his own engineering workshops at Kreta Ayer Road and Kallang in 1942. In later years, he worked for Tien Wah Press as an engineering supervisor. After retiring at 70, he worked at a sundry shop with his wife, Leong Lin, in Chinatown.

Yip was passionate about photography, which started as a hobby to him when he was in his twenties. While working with United Engineers, he saved up enough money to buy his first camera – a Rolleiflex – so that he could take photos for his family album. From then on, his love for photography grew. His keenness to notice change in his surroundings helped him to record part of the cultural landscape in Singapore before the onset of urbanisation.

During the Japanese Occupation, he volunteered for service as a leader of ARPs (Air Raid Personnel) in Chinatown. His photography was disrupted because the Japanese confiscated his camera, but he took it up again when World War II was over.

Yip's interest in photography began as early as 1936. But not until 1964, when he became a member of the Photographic Society of Singapore, at the age of 50, did he pursue photography seriously and send his works for overseas competition. Over the years, he won more than 50 worldwide awards, including those listed below:

1971: Honorary Excellence Distinction conferred by Federation Internationale de l'art Photographique (International Federation of Photographic Art) 1974: Honorary Fellowship conferred by the Photographic Society of Singapore 1980: Elected as the Honorary Outstanding Photographers of the Century by the Photographic Society of New York City 1984: Awarded the Cultural Medallion for his outstanding achievements and contributions to photography.

As Vice-president of the Photographic Society of Singapore from 1966 to 1974, and as adviser to the Kreta Ayer Community Center Camera Club since 1976, Yip played an active role in inspiring and guiding many young people in the art and techniques of photography. On 16 September 1989 he collapsed on an MRT train at around midnight, after taking pictures of the Lantern Festival at the Chinese Garden, clutching a loaded camera on his hands as usual.

== Approach to photography ==
In the early 1950s, working with a mere handful of contemporaries, Yip Cheong Fun faced many difficulties, as described by Choy Weng Yang, former curator at the National Museum of Singapore. Among the difficulties were: an unsympathetic environment, scantiness of reference material, inadequate equipment, and a lack of guidance and direction. Yip's solution to all these problems was trial-and-error experimentation, backed by a passionate spirit. Yip always sought to take photographs that go beyond the surface of superficial attractiveness. His photographs carry a telling message forged by crucial elements such as content, composition, light and timing. In Yip's words, "a good picture must have the right balance and composition."

Though it was possible to improve a photograph after it was developed, Yip chose only to crop and to enlarge. He never used sophisticated darkroom techniques and took care to avoid the temptation to make a photograph through any process of manipulation. Instead, he leaned heavily on his own judgement, experience, and intuition, as noted by Choy Weng Yang: "Yip's approach to photography is not that of the photojournalist who must make news, nor the fashion photographer who must flatter, nor the industrial photographer who must explain, nor the publicity photographer who must be an image maker. His is the artist's approach free of the functional constraints and yet must reach out for something else. Yip decides to express a fragment of his imagination."

Yip also took a sincere and humanistic approach to photography. Dr. Andrew Yip, one of Yip Cheong Fun's four sons, who displays and sells some of his father's works together with his own poems at a stall near the Chinatown Heritage Center, described the elder Yip's photographic works on the website he has created for his father: "He (Yip Cheong Fun) understood how photography can be a great medium not just to record truth and beauty, but to capture the defining moments of the changes that affect all of us in any human situation, and to interpret the dynamic interplay of the elements that constitute life and the human spirit." Indeed, the humanistic approach to photography was shown throughout his seascape photography, black-and-white photography, child portraiture and documentary photography.

== Seascape photography ==
In the 1950s, Yip spent much time photographing the Chinese junks that brought him from China and Hong Kong to Singapore. Many of his photographs depict the sea and the lives of fishermen. In the 1950s, he was known as a seascape specialist. The shimmering lights and reflections on the sea's face in many of his photographs became the hallmark of his seascape works. "Rowing at Dawn", Yip's most locally and internationally recognised photograph, was taken at Tanjong Rhu, where many Chinese junks anchored during this period. Yip took a sampan with his friend in the heavy morning mist and captured this special moment using the camera Super Ikonta he bought after the Japanese Occupation. The solitary boatman rowing in the misty morning light, in his view, symbolised the new Singapore, which had just won self-government in 1957. Yip celebrated the end of colonialism and "the dawn of a new day, new hope and new beginning for Singapore", and was given the internationally acclaimed title of Outstanding Photographer of the Century (Seascapes) by the Photographic Society of New York in 1980.

== Child portraiture ==
Yip Cheong Fun often used to visit the Malay Kampongs at Geylang Lorong 3 after early morning boat trips in the 1950s. He would often take pictures of the children living there, giving them supplementary copies on subsequent visits. One photograph of which Yip was very fond shows a young boy looking straight into the camera with his hands placed on a wooden beam. His brother stood behind the child and held tightly onto the wooden beams as well. "4 hands and 2 eyes are all in one row", Yip said while touching this precious piece of photograph, "what is most outstanding is the child's eyes." Although Yip did not reveal his feelings towards this photograph, the inclusion of a wooden beam that created distance and the four hands tightly holding on to it that created tension suggested some of Yip's thoughts of childhood. Indeed, Andrew Yip, a psychologist, believes that Yip Cheong Fun's work on child portraiture was affected by his early childhood, which was filled with his memories of fleeing from floods, famine and wars in China and the difficult time living in Singapore with his mother. The photograph "A Father's Care", where a man was trying to help his daughter to get down from a large piece of rock, is deeply moving with the understanding that Yip was four when he lost his father.

Bridget Tracy Tan, Director of Gallery and Theatre in the Nanyang Academy of Fine Arts in Singapore, commented on Yip Cheong Fun's child portraiture: "Yip was known as a child-portrait photographer in his time, made famous by his many images of children, some dark, some compelling, some uncannily exhilarating, and others still reserved, impenetrable.... The depth of Yip's perception is as much about the children as it is about himself. If we read a burden of anxiety upon a face, we understand full well that Yip's childhood was not an unblemished one. If we read the light of innocence and imagination upon a face, then we know Yip's experiences bore the same if not as a child himself, then as that within his own children, all six of them. If we catch the outbreak of happiness through smiles and laughter, we know that this kind of joy is not limited to heady childhood, but lives on well into old age."

== Documentary photography ==
Dr. Kelvin Tan, president of the Singapore Heritage Society, said Yip Cheong Fun's documentary photographs are "a powerful reminder of a way of life that is probably gone for ever." Yip recorded a wide range of activities that constituted a large part of Singapore's cultural landscape in its early days. Indeed, we might see another Singapore when we look at a Taoist priest leaping through a wall of flame amid a flurry of "Hell Notes", or the silhouette of a woman heaving a cart through a torrential downpour, or an opium addict surrounded by waves of smoke, as described by the Straits Times journalist Corrie Tan.

Sensitivity to the changes in his social and physical environment, persistence in recording the changes and his passion for photography also enabled Yip to document in a large number of photographs the physical and social impact of urbanisation. He visited the kampong sites regularly, and took pictures on every aspect of life in Chinatown and its vicinity. "Chinatown was his passion and life; he would roam the streets, carrying a camera like a woman would carry a handbag," said Andrew Yip describing his father's passion for documentary photography. Yip Cheong Fun used to stand on the same spot at New Bridge Road (New Bridge Road, alongside Eu Tong Sen Street, was the meeting place of Chinese immigrants in the early 1950s) in 1955 and again in 1978 to take pictures of Chinatown. The changes in 23 years are apparent when the two images are compared.

Dr. Kelvin Tan, president of the Singapore Heritage Society, defined the documentary photography as having the specific aim of recording a present reality for future generations. "Singaporeans must be made to realize great photographs are not the sole preserve of Henri Cartier-Bresson or Alfred Stieglitz. We have our own masters too. More important, they documented our past, not someone else's." Ken Kwek, a leading feature writer of the Straits Times, wrote about the need to revive the waning art form of documentary photography and expressed his concern that "Singapore is forgetting the photo artists who spent their lives capturing a cultural landscape that would be rapidly effaced in the name of economic progress." Yip, in his view, was among the few photographers to have "registered the pain of modernization" poignantly. Kwek also used Yip's late 1960s photograph of an old tree crumbling in the foreground of a burgeoning metropolis as an example of the emotional schisms of urbanisation.

== Contemporaries ==
David P. C. Tay, the 1982 Cultural Medallion recipient and President of the Photographic Society of Singapore has commented on Yip and his works: "Over the last two decades I have known Mr. Yip, I have been deeply impressed by his ability to express his experience through photographic prints, as well as to show us there is more to pictures than meets the eye."

Ang Chwee Chai, the 1983 Cultural Medallion recipient, said: "Yip loves capturing the spirit and emotions of people in different moods, as well as the atmosphere of dawn. These have been reflected in many of his artistic works which he received much acclaim for his creativity and individuality."

Yip also learned from some of his contemporaries. His street-style approach to documentary photography was influenced by his friend and contemporary Henri Cartier-Bresson from France, who was famous for his photo-journalism.

Other contemporary photographers include Lee Lim, who gained inspiration for his photography through Chinese painting, and Kouo Shang Wei, who was fond of architectural photography and was also interested in the subject of Samsui Women.

== Publications ==
- Tan, Bridget Tracy; Yip, Cheong Fun, 1903-1989; Singapore. National Library Board; Singapore Heritage Society (2006), An ingenious reverie : the photography of Yip Cheong Fun, National Library Board, ISBN 978-981-05-5737-9
- Yu, An-jin; 유안진; Yip, Cheong Fun, 1903-1989; Singapore. National Library Board; Singapore Heritage Society (1991), Sollo esŏ dyuet ŭro : Yu An-jin esei, Tongsŏ Munhaksa, ISBN 978-981-05-5737-9
- Yip, Andrew; Yip, Cheong Fun, 1903-1989 (2009), A poetic vision : the photography of Yip Cheong-Fun, ServiceWorld Centre, ISBN 978-981-08-2836-3
- Yip, Cheong Fun (1986), Yip Cheong Fun's pictorial collection, [C.F. Yip
- Keye, Andre W; Yip, Cheong Fun, 1903-1989 (2004), Chinatown : different exposures, Fashion21, Publications Division : Distributed by MarketAsia Distributors (S), ISBN 978-981-05-0575-2
- Yip, Andrew; Yip, Cheong Fun (2006), Singapore Chinatown in pictures = Hua shuo niu che shui (2nd ed.), Fashion 21, ISBN 978-981-05-5602-0

== Influence ==
Yip has many disciples and taught at both the Photographic Society and the Kreta Ayer Camera Club for decades. The former Deputy Prime Minister and Foreign Minister, Mr. S. Rajaretnam studied photography with him. The former Chief Architect of the Housing and Development Board, Mr. Tony Tan was also noted to be his disciple. Photographers such as Tan Yik Yee and Mr. Low Soon Leong, who taught at the SAFRA camera club, were also influenced by Yip's works and teaching. In 2015, Yip was awarded the Tribute Award in recognition of his contributions to art, culture and heritage of Singapore by the Minister for Information and the Arts, Mr. Lawrence Wong in a public ceremony held at Empress Place.

Yip has influenced not only people enthusiastic about photography, but also people interested in the preservation of Singapore's memory of the past, among them Chong Wing Hong, for example. As a veteran columnist with Chinese daily Lianhe Zaobao, Chong compiled a book of essays to preserve his memories of the Chinatown where he grew up. Blooms in Glimpse: Story of Kreta Ayer is a 179-page book containing 34 essays in Chinese and 22 black-and-white photographs by Yip Cheong Fun. "He (Yip Cheong Fun) managed to crystallize my memories of Kreta Ayer in his pictures", Chong said. Chong especially emphasised one photograph taken by Yip that consists of a silhouette of a woman heaving a cart through a torrential downpour, seeing the person in the straw hat =as a fitting symbol of Singapore, more apt than even the Merlion. Chong said, "The picture represents how Singaporeans once braved the storms to build up this country, and it still represents our fighting spirit today."
