= Iskandar Jalil =

Iskandar Jalil (born 5 January 1940) is a Singapore ceramist. He was awarded the Cultural Medallion for Visual Arts in 1988.

== Early works ==
Contrary to the famous belief, Iskandar's early works was first made in the teacher training college instead of Japan. The artist describes his early works as "crude but honest works. They show no philosophy. I didn't think that much about color or ideas when I made them. The philosophy and aesthetics come in later."

== Career ==
Iskandar grew up at Kampong Chantek at Bukit Timah and studied at Victoria School. He had trained and worked initially as a maths and science teacher.

Iskandar was given a Colombo Plan scholarship in 1966 to study textile printing and weaving in India. In 1973, he was awarded a second Colombo Plan scholarship to study ceramic engineering in Japan. Thus began his passion for pottery. Since the 1970s, Iskandar had exhibited his work in Malaysia, Taiwan, Hong Kong, Japan, and Sweden. Besides being a prolific potter, he also influenced young artists through his teaching.

He taught at the Baharuddin Vocational Institute and later at Temasek Polytechnic's School of Design until his retirement in 1999. He also taught at community centres and the Nanyang School of Fine Arts. He has been an external examiner for colleges in Australia and Malaysia. He still gives weekly lectures on pottery at the National University of Singapore. In addition, he also participated in community projects, such as helping to fund the Singa Kiln Project in Siem Reap, Cambodia, in 2004.

A highly influential instructor-mentor, Iskandar occupies a pivotal place in Singapore's modern ceramics art history. The characteristic features of Iskandar's works include tactile, rich surfaces, use of twigs as embellishments, use of Southeast Asian motifs and Jawi calligraphy, use of Iskandar Blue, his one-hand technique and local clay, his admiration of Japanese ceramics aesthetics and philosophy (e.g. Mingei Craft Movement). Iskandar has produced large public art works alongside the modest chawan bowl.

Iskandar's work is featured in the collections of many international public and private collections, such as those by the National Museum of Sweden, Sultan of Brunei, former American President George Bush, and the Governor of Hong Kong. His work is also included in several collections in Singapore, including those by Senior Minister Lee Kuan Yew, National Museum of Singapore, several banks, statutory boards and educational organisations.

In 1988, Iskandar was awarded the Cultural Medallion for Visual Arts.

Some of his larger works can be seen in public places like the MRT wall mural in Tanjong Pagar MRT station (1988), and the wall mural in Changi Airport Terminal Two (1990). His works are also displayed at the Istana.

In 2009, Iskandar was awarded the Berita Harian Achiever Award given by Berita Harian.

In August 2014, Iskandar received the Japanese Foreign Minister's Commendation award for his contribution to the promotion of Japanese culture in Singapore. Over the last two decades, he has taken 200 disciples to Japan to nurture their interest in ceramic art and given them a chance to experience Japanese culture.

In 2015, Iskandar was awarded the Order of the Rising Sun (Gold Rays with Rosette) from the Emperor of Japan, "in recognition of his significant contributions towards the cultural exchange and mutual understanding through the pottery between Japan and Singapore"

== Personal life ==
Iskandar is married to Saleha bte Amir and they have a son and daughter.

In September 2014, Iskandar revealed that he was diagnosed with Stage 4 prostate cancer since the beginning of the year.

== Awards ==
- 1977: Special Award, the National Day Art Exhibition
- 1988: Cultural Medallion for Visual Arts
- 1994: Fellow, Centre for the Arts, National University of Singapore
- 1998: Pingat Apad, Angkatan Pelukis Aneka Daya
- 2002: Berita Harian Achiever of the Year award
- 2014: Japanese Foreign Minister's Commendation Award
- 2015: Order of the Rising Sun, Gold Rays with Rosette, from the Emperor of Japan
