= Wang Sui Pick =

Singaporean calligrapher (1904–1998)

Wang Sui Pick (1904 — 18 May 1998) was a prominent calligrapher in Singapore. He was awarded the Cultural Medallion in 1993.

== Early life and education ==
Wang was born in Anxi, Fujian in 1904. His parents moved to Singapore, and he joined them there after graduating from a high school in Xiamen. While in high school, he developed an interest in finger calligraphy. After spending three-and-a-half years teaching in schools, he returned to Xiamen to attend Xiamen University, and graduated from the university with a law degree.

== Career ==
After graduating, he spent sixteen years teaching at various schools across Fujian. Wang returned to Singapore in 1954 and was employed at the Nanyang Girls' High School as a teacher. In 1961, he was appointed the principal of the Chong Hua High School in Kluang, Malaysia. He was appointed the principal of the Chong Hwa Independent High School in Kua Lumpur in 1967. He retired from 1970 and spent a decade practising finger calligraphy. In 1977, he became an advisor to the Tai Guan Ong Clan Association, a role which he held until his death. In 1980, he joined the San Yi Finger Painting Society and the Chinese Calligraphy Society of Singapore. Tan Siah Kwee, a prominent calligrapher who was serving as the president of the latter organisation, later became one of Wang's largest supporters.

In 1981, Wang held his first solo exhibition. Within the first three days of the exhibition, 80 percent of his works were sold. A book on his calligraphy was published in conjunction with the exhibition. Following the success of the exhibition, he participated in various calligraphy exhibitions held across Asia. In the following year, he began judging national calligraphy competitions organised by the Chinese Calligraphy Society of Singapore and the Ministry of Culture. In the same year, became a part-time lecturer of the Running Style Course, which was organised by the Extramural Studies Department of the National University of Singapore. He also began demonstrating calligraphy in various local schools and community centres. In 1983, second book on his calligraphy was published. This was followed by a third book in 1985. He held a solo exhibition in Xiamen and Anxi in 1987. In 1988, he held another solo exhibition in the Singapore Chinese Chamber of Commerce and Industry Building. He was awarded the Cultural Medallion for Visual Arts for his contributions to calligraphy in Singapore in 1993. In the same year, he donated 30 pieces of his calligraphy to the National Gallery Singapore. In 1997, he held his fourth solo exhibition, becoming the oldest Chinese calligrapher to hold an exhibition. In 1997, he donated all 40 pieces of his calligraphy from his first solo exhibition to the Chinese Calligraphy Society of Singapore. He donated another five pieces of his calligraphy to the Singapore Art Museum.

== Death ==
Wang died on 18 May 1998, leaving behind five sons and two daughters.
