= Tan Lip Seng =

Singaporean photographer

Tan Lip Seng (simplified Chinese: 陈立诚; traditional Chinese: 陳立誠; 26 July 1942 – 29 April 2025) was a Singaporean photographer known for his slide photography, photomontage, and semi-abstract colour works. He received the Cultural Medallion in 1985 for his contributions to photography. He was also awarded the Royal Photographic Society's Fellowship (FRPS) in 1970 for colour photography, and received the Society's Fenton Medal in 1998.

== Career ==
Tan took up photography in his youth and later worked as a medical photographer at the University of Singapore. Alongside his professional work, he became known for his salon photography and colour slide work.

Tan developed from earlier black-and-white montage experiments into a distinctive colour practice involving layered transparencies and multiple exposures, producing semi-abstract images that became a hallmark of his style.

He was a successful international salon exhibitor. According to National Gallery Singapore, he was recognised as one of the Photographic Society of America's top ten colour slide exhibitors from 1969 to 1988, and his colour slides were accepted more than 6,000 times and won more than 1,000 awards at international salons between 1962 and 1997.

Tan's work was included in major institutional presentations of Singapore and Southeast Asian photography. In 2022, The Straits Times reported that his award-winning works from 1965 to 1970 were featured in National Gallery Singapore's exhibition Living Pictures: Photography in Southeast Asia, describing them as prints of montages made from 35mm transparency slides and contact prints, sometimes with added colour layers.

== Death and legacy ==
Tan died on 29 April 2025 at the age of 82. His death was reported in Singapore's Chinese-language press, including Shin Min Daily News and Lianhe Zaobao, which described him as a Cultural Medallion recipient and summarised his long career in photography, including his medical-photography work and his distinctive colour photographic style.

Professional photography societies also published obituary notices after his death. The RPS Journal noted that Tan had served as the Royal Photographic Society's overseas representative for Singapore and had promoted the Society locally, while the PSA Journal highlighted his long service to the Photographic Society of America and his honours within the organisation.

== Photographic practice ==
Tan developed an experimental approach to colour photography from the late 1960s, using layered transparencies, high-contrast films and colour-derivation techniques. A 1972 Straits Times Annual profile described him as a leading Singapore exponent of contemporary photography and reported that he began experimenting with bas-relief effects in 1967 before progressing to high-contrast film, toning and diazochrome derivations. He used altered and intensified colours to enhance mood and visual expression in his images. Tan also employed a technique in which two films were mounted slightly out of register to emphasise selected edges and forms.

His colour montages typically combined a Kodachrome transparency with another photographic or graphic-arts film, including Kodalith ortho film, fine-grain positive film or diazotype film. Tan's work as a medical photographer familiarised him with materials such as Kodalith and diazotype films, which were used professionally in the production of projection slides and visual aids. His involvement with the Photographic Society of Singapore also provided opportunities for the exchange of photographic techniques and participation in international photo salons.
