= Kam Kee Yong =

Malaysian violinist

Kam Kee Yong (Chinese: 甘琦勇; born 28 February 1938) is a violinist, conductor, visual artist and educator. He founded the Singapura String Orchestra and the People's Association String Orchestra. He was awarded the Cultural Medallion in 1984 for his contributions to music in Singapore.

== Early life and education ==
Kam was born the eldest of six children on 28 February 1938 in Penang, Malaysia. His father was schoolteacher and freelance jazz musician Kam Beng Soo. He attended the Li Tek School from 1946 to 1953. From 1954 to 1957, he studied at the Chung Ling High School. His father began teaching him the violin when he was ten years old. He then studied under Louis Lim until he was fifteen. He would play the violin and the drums in his father's jazz band. He came to Singapore in 1958 and began studying painting at the Nanyang Academy of Fine Arts the following year on a scholarship obtained from a friend. However, he only attended two lessons before he left the academy as he disliked the way he was being taught. He held a violin recital in Penang later that year to raise funds as he was seeking to study music overseas. Prominent rubber tycoon and philanthropist Tan Boon Peng attended the recital and helped Kam in raising money.

Kam began studying music at the Royal Academy of Music in London, England in 1960 on a scholarship from several prominent rubber philanthropists. His teachers at the academy included Frederick Grinke, Molly Mack, Watson Forbes and Alan Bush. In 1963, he composed String Quartet No. 2 in D minor, which premiered at the academy on 5 December. He won both the John E. West Composition Prize and the Gowland Harrison Award for the piece. He graduated from the academy with a Licentiate in Music. In the same year, he represented Malaysia at the Commonwealth Day performance held at the Commonwealth Institute. While in London, he continued to paint. He held several exhibitions and sold some of his paintings.

== Career ==
After graduating from the academy, he returned to Penang, and then to Singapore. He participated in the Dimitris Mitropoulos Competition for Conducting in 1969 and 1971. In 1970, he founded the Singapura String Orchestra, which held its first performance in 1972 at the Singapore Conference Hall. The event also featured guitarist Alex Abisheganaden, cellist Anne Tan and pianist Ng Kok Cheow as guest artists, as well as solo performances from several younger musicians, including Lynnette Seah. The TOKK Ensemble commissioned him to revise Kuang Xiang Qu for solo violin with piano, harp and percussion in 1975. His revision was performed by the ensemble during their Asia concert tour. In a review of a 1976 performance of Kam's Huai Ku Chau Ben Tchit, Violet Oon of the New Nation wrote that his compositions are "like a breath of fresh air in the stale atmosphere of local music", and that he "tries to capture the essence of his Chinese heritage". In 1978, he toured Australia under the Cultural Award Scheme and performed at several universities and conservatories there. In the same year, he composed Suan Lin Tze, a tone poem named after the Siong Lim Temple in Toa Payoh. The piece was first performed by the Avon Youth Orchestra at the Victoria Theatre and Concert Hall on 28 July. In 1981, he established the People's Association Children's String Orchestra and began serving as its conductor. He founded and became the director of the Kam Kee Yong School of Music and Children's Art in the same year. He was commissioned by the Ministry of Culture to compose The Five Sentiments for ballet and orchestra in the following year. It premiered at the Singapore International Festival of Arts. During the festival, he conducted a music workshop where he performed his Sentiments for Orchestra. He was awarded the Cultural Medallion in 1984. In 1985, he recorded his Chinatown Suite and Marine Parade Suite with the Children's String Orchestra. The recordings were then released by WEA.

In 1989, Kam and his family moved to Toronto, Canada. In the following year, he founded the Avant Garde School of Children's Art and Music there. He taught at the school from 1990 to 2000. Throughout the 1990s, he held solo exhibitions for his art in both Toronto and Singapore. In 1992, Huai Gu, a sonata of his, was premiered by North/South Consonance in New York City. He became an associate member of the Canadian Music Centre in 1993. His daughter, violinist Kam Ning, performed Huai Gu in British Columbia and Ottawa in 1999. The next year, he published Colour and Sound, an art book. During an interview with The Business Times in the same year, he stated that his music and his art "complement each other" and that they "can't be separated". Kam Ning and pianist David Laughton recorded and released the album Cicada: The Complete Works for Violin and Piano by Kam Kee Yong in the following year. In November 2010, the Singapore Symphony Orchestra performed six of his works during a performance featuring Kam Ning as a guest soloist.

Kam has performed in England, Taiwan, South Korea and Hong Kong. His works have also been performed by the Seoul Philharmonic Orchestra and the Delos String Quartet.

== Personal life ==
Kam is married to Jean Van. Violinist Kam Ning and drummer Kam Lei are his children.
