= Tan Choh Tee =

Singaporean artist

- 陈楚智
- Citizenship: Singaporean
- Occupation: Artist
- Years active: 1976–present
- Notable work: Yan Dang Mountains (雁荡山, 2006), triptych, oil on canvas, 72.5 × 182 cm
- Awards: Cultural Medallion for Visual Arts (2006); Asia Visual Arts Award, Korean National Cultural Research Organisation (2006); Creative Visual Art Award, Nanyang Academy of Fine Arts (2005); Special Award, National Day Art Exhibition, Ministry of Culture (1976)

Tan Choh Tee is a Chinese-born Singaporean artist. Born in Guangdong China in 1942, he immigrated to Singapore in 1953, and enrolled himself into the Nanyang Academy of Fine Arts (NAFA) in 1958. He is a highly regarded but low profile second-generation Singaporean artist.

== Career ==
=== Conversion to Full-time Artist ===
In 1976, Tan Choh Tee made the decision to leave his career as a book designer and pursue his passion for art professionally. His extensive oeuvre includes numerous paintings that depict the nostalgic beauty of traditional Singaporean neighborhoods, including Chinatown, Trengganu Street, Jalan Besar, and Geylang. In 1984, Tan Choh Tee began teaching at Nanyang Academy of Fine Arts. His artistic career includes nine solo exhibitions and participation in over 50 group exhibitions in countries such as Russia,Germany, France, the United Kingdom, Japan, Korea, Taiwan, Hong Kong, and Indonesia.

=== Old Singapore: up till the 1980s ===
Tan Choh Tee resigned from his job as a book designer to become a full-time artist in 1976 because of a deep frustration with the rapid demolition of Singapore's heritage. Witnessing the country's fast-paced urban redevelopment, he felt an urgent need to capture and "immortalize" old landscapes—particularly in Chinatown—before they were permanently destroyed by bulldozers. In the early 1970s, Choh Tee realized that historic buildings and shops were vanishing faster than he could paint them on weekends or in his spare time when he was still working as a book designer. His insistence on painting en plein air required significant time that his full-time job did not allow. This prompted him to quit his stable career to dedicate himself fully to preserving these scenes on canvas.

=== Asia: 1980s onwards ===
Tan Choh Tee began painting scenes outside Singapore during the 1980s, expanding his repertoire from his initial focus on "old Singapore" scenes. He started venturing to Thailand, Malaysia, Indonesia, Taiwan and China to paint, always using a plein-air approach to capture local scenes and customs. Every now and then, he would still revisit sites within Singapore.

=== Paris: 1998 & 2025 ===
Tan Choh Tee's three-month residency in Paris in 1998 was a pivotal moment in his career, as he was selected as the first alumni of the Nanyang Academy of Fine Arts to stay in the school's apartment at the Cité Internationale des Arts. This no strings attached stint allowed him to immerse himself in the global art scene, meeting artists from around the world and conducting extensive study tours of major French museums. In the Oral History Interviews conducted by National Archives Singapore, he mentioned that he spent the first two months visiting museums, learning as much as he could from all the masterpieces. Choh Tee was also given a special pass which allowed him to enter the museums freely without having to queue. The trip reinforced his commitment to plein-air painting and his ability to capture fleeting light and atmosphere using his signature realist-impressionist style. This international exposure contributed significantly to his artistic prestige, preceding his receipt of the Cultural Medallion in 2006.

Little is known about Tan Choh Tee's trip to Paris in 2025, except that it was a trip sponsored by a collector, and that the artist paid a visit to the Singapore Embassy in Paris at the start of the trip.

=== Germany: 2024 ===
In June 2024, Tan Choh Tee stayed at the residence of a long-time Chinese collector in Germany and created a series of oil paintings. The creation was accidental as the artist's original intention of the trip was a vacation. However, Choh Tee found inspiration in the scenery that he encountered at Germany, and decided to paint the scenes with locally bought canvases and oil paints. This resulted in eight masterpieces - two of which were given to the host in Germany. The remaining six were brought back to Singapore as the showpieces of an exhibition. These six painting were bought by two Singaporean collectors even before the exhibition started.

=== Awards and Notable Collectors ===
Tan Choh Tee received the Cultural Medallion for Visual Arts in 2006. His artworks are featured in prestigious collections such as the National Museum of Singapore, the Brunei Museum, several other art galleries and private institutions, with UOB holding one of the largest collections with around 28 pieces.

== Partial exhibitions ==
- 1978: Cologne Exhibition, Klockner-Humboldt, Deutz A.G. Museum, Germany.
- 1979: Art in Action, The National Museum, Singapore.
- 1999: One Man Art Exhibition, Apollo Art Gallery, Taipei, Taiwan.
- 2007: The Shanghai Art Fair, Shanghai, China.
- 2007: Imagining The City, Singapore Art Museum, Singapore.
- 2010: Art Expo Malaysia 2010, Kuala Lumpur, Malaysia

== Works ==
Tan Choh Tee's paintings generally fall into one of the following three categories:

1. En plein air
2. Still life
3. Nudes

Also, his works are usually around 60 cm by 70 cm or smaller. Bigger sizes are rare, with diptych being much harder to come by. Triptych, which can be a superior form of art presentation when used appropriately because it breaks the static nature of a single image thus creating a "visual journey" that a standalone canvas cannot achieve, represents the pinnacle of what Choh Tee is trying to achieve in his artistic pursuit. This format is particularly effective for panoramic expansion, allowing a landscape to feel immersive and vast.

== Personality and Reputation ==
Tan Choh Tee is renowned for being a highly principled artist who persists in perfecting his practice while avoiding the limelight and extensive social interaction. As a result, few of his collectors have actually met him in person. He stated in mandarin, “I am not good at socialising, and I am not able to manage if there is too much of it. So I’ll leave it to the art gallery owners to help me deal with the publicity.” When asked whether his decision to avoid such events would have a negative impact on himself as well as the art galleries who represent him, he replied that, because he is not comfortable with socialising, speaking too much might not be beneficial, and that he preferred to let his works speak for themselves.

There are also numerous anecdotal accounts suggesting that Choh Tee was not financially motivated when it came to the sale of his works. He mentioned that he would not sell his paintings immediately after they were completed. In fact, he disliked it when onlookers offered to buy his paintings while he was in the midst of painting, and would usually ignore such offers because he found them disruptive to his creative process and a source of unnecessary stress. There were also many commercial requests urging Choh Tee to paint old Singapore scenes again after these scenes had been demolished, using photographs as references. However, he refused such requests, insisting that he will not paint from photographs because he had no emotional connection to them. There was also an account from a former gallery staff member who shared that Choh Tee was the only Singaporean artist she knew who did not appear particularly excited after learning that his paintings had been sold. In fact, he often took a long time to collect his payment.

One of the most elaborate descriptions of Tan Choh Tee’s personality was given by Tan Chee Lay, an associate professor in the Department of Asian Languages and Culture at the National Institute of Education, when he recounted his first encounter with Tan Choh Tee in 2025. He described the artist as 大隐于市 — “the greatest hermit hides in the city” — a Chinese idiom typically used to describe someone of exceptional ability who prefers to remain low-profile. He suggested that this was likely the reason he had never met Choh Tee in person, even though he had admired his oil paintings for many years. Subsequently, Assoc. Prof. Tan stated that the most appropriate framework through which he could describe both Choh Tee’s works and his personality was the twin concepts of studium and punctum introduced in Camera Lucida, a book written by Roland Barthes. He explained that Choh Tee’s realist-impressionist style, his ability to portray the characteristics of buildings, and his incorporation of relevant details enable viewers to recognise the subject matter, historical context, cultural meaning, and other elements that fall under the concept of studium. However, Assoc. Prof. Tan remarked that it is the punctum in each of Choh Tee’s works that truly moved him. Assoc. Prof. Tan further extended the idea of punctum to describe Choh Tee’s personality. He used the phrase 择善固执 — “choosing what is good and holding persistently to it” — a Chinese idiom that describes the admirable moral quality of recognising righteous principles and adhering to one’s convictions even in the face of difficulties or opposition. According to Assoc. Prof. Tan, Choh Tee’s recurring phrase during their brief encounter was “要么就不做，要做就做到最好” — “Do it to the best of one’s ability, or not at all.” He regarded Choh Tee's single-minded dedication to his artistic pursuit as a form of punctum, which he described as "震撼" ("profoundly striking"). He concluded by stating that the encounter with Choh Tee was an inspiration to him and motivated him to emulate the artist’s approach. However, the outcome convinced him that painting in the manner of Choh Tee was "遥不可及" (an almost unattainable aspiration). This in itself is a testament, as Assoc. Prof. Tan Chee Lay is an accomplished artist in his own right.
