= Phan Wait Hong =

Singaporean opera singer (1914–2016)

- 潘月红
- Born: Pan Lan Zhen; 1914; Shanghai, China
- Died: 1 September 2016 (aged 101–102)

Phan Wait Hong (1914 – 1 September 2016) was a veteran Peking opera performer in Singapore. Known as the grande dame of Peking opera in Singapore, she received the Cultural Medallion for Chinese Opera in 1992.

== Biography ==
Phan was born in Shanghai, China. Her father's surname was Zhao, but she followed her mother's surname as a child. Phan started learning Peking opera when she was 9 – 10 years old and went to Singapore at the request of a local opera troupe when she was 14. Phan joined a Singapore troupe and grew prolific as an actress. She started playing leading roles in opera houses and tea houses in Singapore in the late 1930s. By the 1940s and 1950s, after the Japanese occupation, she was touring Malaya and Indonesia with a professional troupe.

Known for her laosheng (old man) roles, Phan made her name with leading roles of Emperor Han Xian Di in Emperor Han Xian Di Plans to Curb Cao Cao’s Power (Chinese: 逍遥津), as well as in Thrashing the Dragon Robe (Chinese: 打龙袍). The actress kept a low profile by the late 1950s, but continued to perform and teach students with several amateur Peking opera troupes. In her latter years, Phan took on the role of laodan (old lady) as well.

Phan was a recipient of the 1992 Cultural Medallion for Theatre/Chinese Opera and was inducted to the Singapore Women's Hall of Fame in 2014.

Phan died on 1 September 2016 of a heart attack.
