= Eric James Watson =

Welsh musician

Eric James Watson (born 1946) is a Singapore-based Welsh musician, composer, conductor, music, technologist and pedagogue. He was awarded the Cultural Medallion in 2019.

== Early life and education ==
Watson was born in Cardiff, Wales but grew up in Middlesbrough, Yorkshire, England. He studied composition and conducting at the Trinity College Of Music at Greenwich, London, England and won the Ricordi prize in 1967.

== Career ==
After graduation, Watson taught music in schools and then became a conductor and pianist in musical theatre at London’s West End theatre.

Watson was the composer and music director of the 2001 Singapore National Day Parade (NDP). He also wrote and arranged orchestral music with four orchestras, Singapore Symphony Orchestra, Singapore Chinese Orchestra (SCO), an Indian and a Malay ensemble, for the 2007 Singapore NDP.

Watson was also a senior lecturer at the Nanyang Academy of Fine Arts.

In 2006, Watson won the inaugural Chinese Orchestral Composition organised by SCO.

From 2016 to 2018, he was the composer-in-residence of SCO.

Watson was awarded the Cultural Medallion on 15 October 2019.

== Personal life ==
In 1991, Watson moved to Singapore to be with his Singaporean wife. He later became a Singapore permanent resident.
