= Rama Kannabiran =

Tamil-language Singaporean writer (b. 1943)

Rama Kannabiran (born 27 December 1943) is a Singaporean writer. He has been awarded the Cultural Medallion, the S.E.A. Write Award and the Mont Blanc Literary Award.

== Early life ==
He arrived in Singapore from India in 1953. He studied at Raffles Institution. When he was fifteen, he entered a short story competition held by the Tamil Murasu, and won the second prize.

== Career ==
In April 1968, Kannabiran was convinced by his wife to return to writing. From 1968 to 1978, he wrote several short stories. In 1972, his short story Twenty-five Years won him the gold medal at a competition held by the Tamil Nesan. In 1980, two collections of his short stories, Twenty-five Years and Other Stories and For the Sake of Uma and Other Stories, were published. These were followed in the following year by the short story collections The Odorous Wind and Other Stories and The Sozhan Doll. In 1982, Twenty-fire Years and Other Stories won the Book Award for Tamil Fiction of the National Book Development Council. In 1988, he represented Singapore as an Honorary Writing Fellow at the International Writing Programme held by the University of Iowa. He was awarded the S.E.A. Write Award in 1990. In 1992, Pedestal, a collection of two novellas, was published. In 1997, he was awarded the Mont Blanc Literary Award. In 1998, he was awarded the Cultural Medallion.

Kannabiran has also taught at the Rosyth School.

== Personal life ==
Kannabiran is married. He has a son and a daughter.
