= Isa Kamari =

Singaporean writer and musician

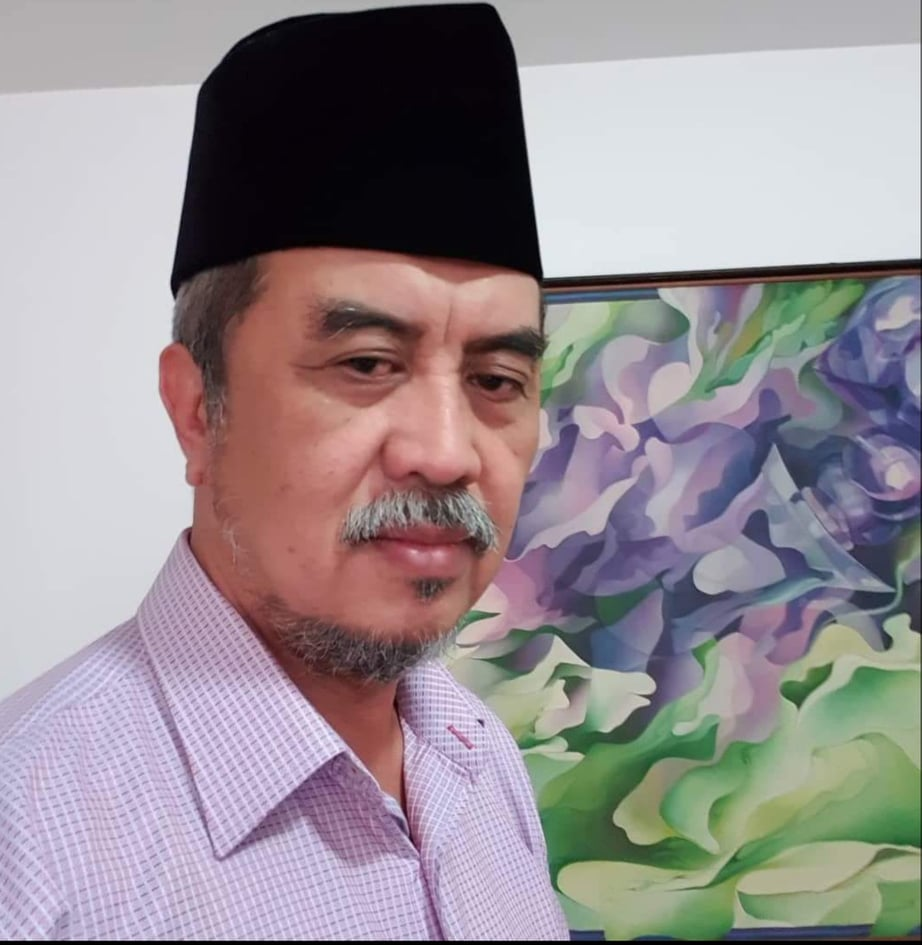
Isa Kamari is a Singaporean Malay-language writer and winner of the Southeast Asian Literary Award (2006). Photo from the archive of V.A. Pogadaeva. Made in Singapore 2018

Isa Kamari (born 1960) is a Singaporean writer. He was awarded the Cultural Medallion in 2007.

== Early life and education ==
Kamari was born in Singapore in 1960. He studied at the National University of Singapore, where he obtained his bacherlor's degree in architecture in 1988. He later studied at the National University of Malaysia, where he obtained a Master of Philosophy in Malay Letters in 2008.

== Career ==
In 1993, his poetry collection Sumur Usia was published. In the same year, he won the Merit Award at the Anugerah Persuratan, which was organised by the Malay Language Council. Sketsa Minda, a collection of his short stories, was published in the following year. In 1995, he again won the Merit Award at the Anugerah Persuratan. In the same year, he won the National Book Development Council Award for Sumur Usia and the Merit Award of the Saadon Ismail Award. In 1997, his short story Permetuan won the Hadiah Sastera at the Anugerah Persuratan. In the following year, his novel Satu Bumi was published. The novel won him the Merit Award at the Anugerah Persuratan in 1999. It was later translated into both Chinese and English. In 2001, his essay Milik Siapa Bumi Yang Satu Ini won the Hadiah Sastera. In 2003, his novels Menara, Kiswah and Tawassul. Menara won the Merit Award at the Anugerah Persuratan in 2003 and was later translated into English, Kiswah was shortlisted for the Singapore Literature Prize in 2004 and the English translation of Tawassul was published in 2009. He wrote the 2003 television drama Dua Wajah and the 2004 television drama Mengejar Bayangan. He is a member of the spiritual music trio Sirrfillsirr, which released its first album, Cinta Arafah, in 2005.

In 2006, he was awarded the S.E.A. Write Award. In the same year, his novel Atas Nama Cinta and his poetry collections Ka'bah, Lorong Wahyu and Cinta Arafah were published, and his debut play Pintu, was staged at The Arts House. The English translation of Atas Nama Cinta was published in 2009. He also served on the Malay Language Learning and Promotion Committee of the Ministry of Education. In 2007, he was awarded the Cultural Medallion. In the same year, his novel Memeluk Gerhana was published. The novel was later translated into English. His second play, Sidang Burung, was staged at The Esplanade in 2008. The play was adapted from The Conference of the Birds, a poem by Sufi poet Attar of Nishapur. In 2009, he won the Tun Seri Lanang Award and his novel Rawa was published. The novel was later translated into English and Chinese. In 2010, Celupan, a collection of his short stories, was published. In the same year, Sirrfillsirr released its second album, Kurnia. In 2011, his novel Duka Tuan Bertakhta was published. Its English translation was published in 2013. In 2014, his novel Selendang Sukma was published. In 2016, his English novella Tweet was published. In 2022, Maladies Of The Soul: Stories, a collection of his short stories, most of which were originally written in Malay before being he translated them into English, was published.

He is a deputy director in the Architecture (Design) Division of the Land Transport Authority.

== Personal life ==
Kamari is married to Sukmawati Sirat, and has two daughters. Sirat has translated several of his works.
