= Chua Soo Bin =

Chua Soo Bin, also spelt Chua Soo-Bin, (Chinese: 蔡斯民; born 1932) is a Singaporean fine-art photographer and recipient of the Cultural Medallion in 1989. Chua was described by The Straits Times as "one of the most sought-after commercial photographers" in Singapore.

== Early life ==
Chua was born 1932 in Singapore. He is the oldest of six children. His father worked at a factory, and his mother was a dressmaker. Chua attended Chong Zhen Primary School, and did not pursue further academic education. He studied art at the Nanyang Academy of Fine Arts.

== Career ==
Chua started his career as a photographer in 1950. As an amateur photographer working for an agency, Chua was cited as "the youngest cameraman in Malaya to be awarded the degree of A.R.P.S [Associate of the Royal Photographic Society of Great Britain]". Chua turned professional in 1972. He served as a judge for the 7th Open Photographic Exhibition organised by the Singapore Art Society, as well as the 40th Singapore International Salon of Photography. His photographs have been showcased in Britain, China and Singapore. In 1990, Chua established the Soo Bin Art Gallery, which displays artworks by contemporary Chinese artists; he is credited with introducing Chinese contemporary art to Singapore. Its paintings fetching tens of thousands of dollars, Soo Bin Art Gallery moved from Halifax Road to Hill Street in August 2000. Chua is the Singapore Gallery Association's Chairperson.

== Personal life ==
Around 1989, Chua experienced a stroke, which he recovered from quickly. He is married to Choo Hsien (née Liew). They have three children – Cher Wei, Cher Tzoen, and Cher Him. He is the owner of two country houses in Chengdu, China, as well as five warehouses in Singapore. Chua is an avid collector, owning more than twenty luxury watches in addition to around a hundred bottles of wine.
