= Tay Teow Kiat =

Chinese music director and conductor

Tay Teow Kiat (simplified Chinese: 郑朝吉; traditional Chinese: 鄭朝吉; pinyin: Zhèng Cháo Jí; born 1947) is the Music Director of East Zone Schools’ Chinese Orchestra Development Centre, President of Singapore Chinese Instrumental Music Association, Music Director of Nanyang Academy of Fine Arts (NAFA) City Chinese Orchestra (CCO), Music Director of Dingyi Chamber Ensemble and Resident Conductor of Dunman High School Chinese Orchestra (DHSCO). He is considered to be the founding father of Chinese orchestral music in Singapore.

== Education ==
Tay studied the sanxian under Yang Hao Ran, an accomplished musician of traditional Southern Chinese music, in the 1960s. In 1980, he studied conducting and music theory under the esteemed musician and educator Professor Li Yi of the Shanghai Conservatory of Music, as well as the conductor Professor Cao Peng.

Tay received his PhD in Chinese music conducting from the Beijing Normal University in 2005.

== Career ==
Since 1985, Tay was invited to conduct numerous professional Chinese orchestras in places such as Shanghai, Tianjin, Shanxi and Shandong as a guest conductor. He has also been invited as a guest or judge in international Chinese music conferences and competitions held in Chicago, Beijing and Shanghai.

Under Tay's leadership, the NAFA City Chinese Orchestra (NAFA CCO) and Dunman High School Chinese Orchestra (DHSCO) has received a high degree of recognition and acclaim from both local and foreign critics. His creatively programmatic concerts have delighted local audiences, and enhanced the interaction between the music communities in Singapore and China.

Since 1982, Tay has conducted the DHSCO on performance tours in Thailand, Hong Kong, Taiwan, Malaysia, Brunei, Beijing, Shanghai, Guangzhou, Zhanjiang, Tianjin, Guilin, Shenzhen, Nanjing, Suzhou and Jiangyin. He has also conducted the NAFA CCO in concerts in Beijing and Tianjin in 1996, Jilin and Beijing in 2007, and Taiwan in 2013.

In 1992, the Chinese music magazine People’s Music in an article on Tay, described his conducting as “...meticulous, precise and sensitive... yet graceful and refined. His insightful understanding and grasp of traditional music culture enables him to render different music styles accurately, bringing out the essence of each piece of music through the orchestra... one cannot help but be impressed by the calibre of his conducting, and his ability to train an orchestra”.

In addition to developing the two orchestras under his baton, Tay has also contributed immensely in training many young musical talents in Singapore. Some of them have gone on to become professional musicians and young conductors in their own rights. The two orchestras under him and many of his students have won numerous gold medals like “Best Performance Awards”, “Best Orchestra Awards”, as well as the top three prizes in various National Music Competitions and the Singapore Youth Festival Chinese Music Competitions. Their participation and achievements have helped raise the standard of Chinese music in Singapore and established a firm foundation for further excellence.

For his contributions, Tay was awarded the National Day Efficiency Medal in 1989 and the Commendation Plaque (by the Extra Curricular Activities Centre, ECAC) for music and dance activities in 1991. He was also the recipient of the National Arts Council Cultural Medallion in 1993 and the National Day Award-Long Service Medal (Education Service) in 1997.

Tay is an honorary committee member of the China Chinese Music Society, honorary advisor of the Tianjin Musicians’ Association, Honorary conductor of the Beijing Cui Wei Primary School Traditional Music Orchestra, honorary leader and guest conductor of the Shanxi Drama School Chinese Orchestra, guest conductor of the Tianjin Conservatory of Music Chinese Orchestra, guest conductor of the Shandong Jinan Qianwei Chinese Orchestra, artistic advisor of Shandong Heze Chinese Orchestra Middle School and guest professor of Shanxi Arts Academy and Shanxi Training College of Arts.
