= Wong Meng Voon =

Singaporean writer

Wong Meng Voon (born 27 July 1937) is a Singaporean writer who writes under the pen name Meng Yi. He is a co-founder of the Singapore Association of Writers and was the first Chinese-language writer to be awarded the Cultural Medallion.

== Early life and education ==
Wong was born on 27 July 1937 in Perak, Malaysia. He and his family later relocated to Pahang to avoid the Japanese invasion of Malaya. He began his primary school education there in 1946. He then moved to Penang, and where he began attending the Han Chiang High School. He began submitting his literary works to Chinese-language publications in both Malaysia and Singapore. He won several prizes for some of his submissions. He then returned to Pahang to become a teacher, but left for Singapore to study at Nanyang University shortly after in 1958. He received his Bachelor of Arts degree in Chinese literature from the university in 1961, after which he became a secondary school teacher and an editor the Ming Pao. He obtained his honours degree there in 1966, and his Master's degree in 1968. He received his Doctor of Philosophy degree from the University of Washington in 1975.

== Career ==
In 1969, Wong published the short story collection When I Met Huilan Again, which was well received. In the following year, he published I Want to Live, which was also well received. In 1970, he co-founded the Singapore Association of Writers, after which he moved to America. He returned to Singapore in 1976 and was made the president of the association, a role he held for 20 years. He also served as the association's honorary president, the vice-president of the Asian Chinese Writers Association, the president of the World Chinese Writers Association, and the charter president of the World Chinese Mini Fiction Research Association. He was also an assistant at the Ministry of Education.

In 1981, he was awarded the Cultural Medallion, becoming the first Chinese-language writer to have been awarded the award. In the same year, he was awarded the S.E.A. Write Award. He also left the Ministry of Education to join the Stamford College Group, and published Glimpses of the Past, a collection of his short stories. In 1991, he published The Happy Nest, which featured a different style of writing than his previous works. In 1993, he published The Sun Brushes Against Me, a prose and short story collection, and From Summertime to Wintertime at Water Curtain Cave Secondary School a short story and micro-novel collection. In 1997, he published the prose and short story collection Oh! Eastern City.

Wong officially retired in 2000, after which he continued to give lectures on modern Chinese literature at the National University of Singapore and the Singapore Institute of Management. He edited A Preliminary Study of the History of Singapore Chinese Literature, which was published in 2002. In the same year, he was made a member of the Arts Advisory Panel of the National Arts Council. He was awarded the Whole-Life Accomplishment on World Chinese Mini-Fiction Award by the World Chinese Mini-fiction Research Association in 2008, the Life-long Achievement Award for Micro-novels at the Zhengzhou Micro-novels Festival in 2011, and the Contribution Award at the World Conference on Chinese Micro-novels in 2018.

== Personal life ==
Tan married Tan Hua Sok in 1964. Together, they have a son and a daughter.
