= Madhavi Krishnan (dancer) =

Singaporean dancer

- Born: 1941
- Occupation: Dancer
- Awards: Cultural Medallion in 1979

Madhavi Krishnan (born 1941) is a Singaporean dancer and actress. She was both a founding member and the principal dancer of the National Dance Theatre Company. She was awarded the Cultural Medallion in 1979 and was inducted into the Indian Hall of Fame Singapore in 2022.

== Career ==
Krishnan began winning prizes at dance competitions at the age of five. At the age of 14, she travelled to Chennai, India to learn the Kathakali dance under dancer Gopinath Thangamani, and the Bharatanatyam dance under dance instructor T.V. Soundarajan. She toured India and Southeast Asia with her roommate Ganga. While performing in Chennai, she was spotted by actor and comedian T. S. Durairaj, and appeared in his 1963 drama film Aayiram Kalathu Payir. She then went on to appear in over 30 films. Most of the films she appeared in were in Tamil, but some were either in Telugu or Malayalam.

Krishnan returned to Singapore in 1970 and became both a founding member and the principal dancer of the newly-established National Dance Theatre Company. With the company, she performed in Moscow, Kharkiv, Tehran, Jakarta, Korea, various locations across Western Europe and the United States. She choreographed Thaipusam for the Adelaide Festival in 1971. She was awarded the Cultural Medallion under the dance category in 1979.

Krishnan was inducted into the Indian Hall of Fame Singapore in 2022.

== Personal life ==
Krishnan lives in Perth, Australia with her husband, Rajalingam Chinniah, a doctor employed at the Fiona Stanley Hospital in Murdoch, a suburb of Perth, and her daughter, Anjali Chinniah, a lawyer.
