= Teo Bee Yen =

Singaporean photographer

Teo Bee Yen (born 1950 in Fujian, China) is a photographer from Singapore.
