= Lin Chen (chess player) =

Chinese chess grandmaster (born 1988)

Personal information
- Born: September 14, 1988 (age 38) Jiangsu, China

Chess career
- Country: China
- Title: Grandmaster (2016)
- FIDE rating: 2466 (October 2026)
- Peak rating: 2533 (January 2016)

Lin Chen (Chinese: 林晨; born September 14, 1988) is a Chinese chess grandmaster.

== Chess career ==
In August 2015, Lin participated in the Asian Continental Chess Championship. By the sixth round, he was leading alongside Surya Shekhar Ganguly, and they drew their games against each other. In the seventh round, he lost to Abhijeet Gupta. Lin finished 24th in the Blitz championship out of a field of 83, and also defeated Salem Saleh in their encounter. He finished 4th in the Rapid championship.

In December 2015, Lin was able to hold Wesley So to a draw in the Qatar Masters.
