= Cultural Medallion =

Singaporean cultural award

- Awarded for: Individual's distinctive contributions to the development of Singapore's cultural landscape
- Sponsored by: National Arts Council
- Date: 1979–present
- Country: Singapore
- Presented by: President of Singapore
- Reward: SGD $80,000
- Website: www.nac.gov.sg/singaporeartsscene/culturalMedallion/overview.html

The Cultural Medallion (Malay: Pingat Budaya) is a cultural award in Singapore conferred to those who have achieved artistic excellence in dance, theatre, literature, music, photography, art and film. It is widely recognized as Singapore's pinnacle arts award.

== History ==
The award was instituted in March 1979 by Minister for Culture Ong Teng Cheong and administered by the National Arts Council. The awards was given by the Minister for Culture.

Since 2006, the award was presented by the President of Singapore instead of the Minister for Information, Communications and the Arts (previously known as Minister for Culture). On 20 October Minister for Information, Communications and the Arts Lee Boon Yang announced that project grant for the award is revised to S$80,000 upwards from S$50,000, giving recipients better opportunities to create major works.

From 2013, in an effort to recognise multi-disciplinary artists, it was announced that recipients of the Cultural Medallion and Young Artist Award will no longer be categorised according to art forms.

== List of Cultural Medallion recipients ==
Year	Category	Name	Ref
1979	Dance	Madhavi Krishnan	
1979	Theatre	Bani Bin Buang	
1979	Music	Choo Hoey	
1979	Music	David Lim Kim San	
1979	Literature	Edwin Nadason Thumboo	
1979	Art	Wee Beng Chong	
1981	Dance	Goh Soo Khim	
1981	Theatre	Joanna Wong Quee Heng	
1981	Music	Ahmad bin Ja'afar	
1981	Literature	Wong Meng Voon	
1981	Art	Lee Hock Moh	
1981	Art	Ng Eng Teng	
1982	Theatre	Lin Chen	
1982	Music	Leong Yoon Pin	
1982	Literature	Goh Poh Seng	
1982	Photography	David Tay Poey Cher	
1982	Art	Georgette Chen Liying	
1983	Theatre	Christopher Henry Rothwell Allen	
1983	Music	Vivien Goh	
1983	Literature	Arthur Yap	
1983	Photography	Ang Chwee Chai	
1984	Theatre	S. Varathan	
1984	Music	Kam Kee Yong	
1984	Photography	Yip Cheong Fun	
1984	Art	Thomas Yeo	
1985	Theatre	Low Ing Sing	
1985	Literature	Lee Tzu Pheng	
1985	Photography	Tan Lip Seng	
1985	Art	Tay Chee Toh	
1986	Dance	Goh Choo San	
1986	Theatre	Almahdi Al-Haj Ibrahim	
1986	Theatre	N Palanivelu	
1986	Music	Paul Abisheganaden	
1986	Literature	Wong Yoon Wah	
1986	Art	Pan Shou	
1986	Art	Teo Eng Seng	
1987	Dance	Som Said	
1987	Theatre	Max Le Blond	
1987	Music	Teng Mah Seng	
1987	Literature	Muhammed Ariff bin Ahmad	
1987	Photography	Lee Lim	
1987	Art	Tan Swie Hian	
1988	Dance	Lim Fei Shen	
1988	Theatre	Tay Bin Wee	
1988	Music	Alexander S. Abisheganaden	
1988	Literature	Singai Mukilan (N Abdul Rahman)	
1988	Photography	Chua Soo Bin	
1988	Art	Iskandar Jalil	
1989	Dance	Neila Sathyalingam	
1989	Theatre	Kuo Pao Kun	
1989	Photography	Foo Tee Jun	
1989	Art	Goh Beng Kwan	
1990	Dance	Santha Bhaskar	
1990	Theatre	Han Lao Da	
1990	Music	Lim Yau	
1990	Literature	Chew Kok Chang	
1990	Photography	Peng Seng Wu	
1990	Art	Anthony Poon	
1990	Art	Ong Kim Seng	
1992	Dance	Ying E Ding	
1992	Theatre	Phan Wait Hong	
1992	Music	Choo Hwee Lim	
1992	Art	Wang Sui Pick	
1993	Music	Tay Teow Kiat	
1995	Dance	Goh Lay Kuan	
1995	Art	Han Sai Por	
1996	Music	Phoon Yew Tien	
1996	Literature	Lew Poo Chan (Dan Ying)	
1997	Theatre	Lou Mee Wah	
1997	Literature	Ho Minfong	
1998	Literature	Rama Kannabiran	
1999	Literature	Abdul Ghani Hamid	
1999	Art	Chua Ek Kay	
2000	Art	Tan Siah Kwee	
2001	Art	Tan Kian Por	
2001	Music	Yan Hui Chang	
2002	Music	Jeremy Monteiro	
2003	Art	Lim Tze Peng	
2003	Theatre	Ong Keng Sen	
2003	Literature	Yeng Pway Ngon	
2004	Photography	Teo Bee Yen	
2005	Film	Jack Neo	
2005	Literature	M. Balakrishnan (MA. Ilangkannan)	
2005	Music	Dick Lee	
2005	Visual Arts	Chng Seok Tin	
2005	Visual Arts	Lee Wen	
2006	Art	Tan Choh Tee	
2006	Music	Lynnette Seah	
2007	Film	Eric Khoo	
2007	Literature	Isa Kamari	
2008	Literature	Chia Hwee Pheng	
2008	Literature	P. Krishnan	
2008	Music	Iskandar Mirza Ismail	
2009	Dance	Angela Liong	
2009	Literary Arts	Tham Yew Chin	
2009	Music	Lan Shui	
2009	Visual Arts	Ang Ah Tee	
2010	Music	Liang Wern Fook	
2010	Literary Arts	Suratman Markasan	
2010	Visual Arts	Amanda Heng	
2011	Music	Kelly Tang	
2011	Visual Arts	Lim Yew Kuan	
2011	Theatre	Atin Amat	
2011	Music	Yusnor Ef	
2012	Literary Arts	J.M. Sali	
2012	Music	Jennifer Tham	
2012	Theatre	Thirunalan Sasitharan	
2012	Visual Arts	Ho Ho Ying	
2012	Visual Arts	Milenko Prvacki	
2013	Theatre	Ivan Heng	
2013	Literary Arts	Mohamed Latiff Mohamed	
2013	Music	Tsung Yeh	
2014	Theatre	Alvin Tan	
2014	Visual Arts	Chong Fah Cheong	
2014	Literary Arts	K. T. M. Iqbal	
2015	Visual Arts	Chua Mia Tee	
2015	Theatre	Haresh Sharma	
2015	Literary Arts	Lim Hung Chang (Lin Gao)	
2015	Music	Margaret Leng Tan	
2016	Visual Arts	Koh Mun Hong	
2016	Music	Asiah Aman (Nona Asiah)	
2017	Theatre	Djamal Tukimin	
2017	Music	Law Wai Lun	
2018	Music	Louis Soliano	
2018	Dance	Low Mei Yoke	
2019	Music	Eric James Watson	
2020	Visual Arts	Sarkasi Said	
2020	Visual Arts	Vincent Leow	
2021	Literary Arts	Chia Joo Ming	
2021	Music	Rahimah Rahim	
2022	Dance	Aravinth Kumarasamy	
2022	Theatre	Kok Heng Leun	
2023	Literary Arts	Suchen Christine Lim	
2023	Dance	Osman Abdul Hamid	
2023	Literary Arts	Meira Chand	
2024	Music	Ghanavenothan Retnam	
2024	Visual Arts	Siew Hock Meng	
2025	Visual Arts	Nai Swee Leng	
2025	Theatre	Goh Boon Teck	

== See also ==
- Culture of Singapore
