= Singai Mukilan =

N. Abdul Rahman (1922 — 1992), better known by his pen name Singai Mukilan, was a poet. He was awarded the Cultural Medallion in 1988.

== Early life ==
Mukilan was born in Cholapuram, India in 1922. He left India for Malacca in 1938, where he began working at a provision shop.

== Career ==
In Malacca, he was active in the Malayan Dravidian Association and the Malaccan Tamil's Reform Association. His first poem was published in the Kudi Arasu, a weekly magazine published by Periyar. At the age of 18, his first two volumes of poetry, Tamil Oil Geetham Part 1 and Tamil Oil Geetham Part 2, were published by the Malaccan Tamil's Reform Association in 1939. His third volume of poetry, Dravida Mani Geetham, was published in 1940. During the Japanese occupation, he published poems which supported the withdrawal of British forces from India in Tamil language periodicals in Singapore. He also served as a signaller of the Malayan headquarters of the Indian National Army.

In 1964, he published another volume of poetry, Indian National Army Songs. His next volume of poetry, Ithaya Malar, was published in Singapore in 1952. In 1954, he published his sixth volume of poetry, Thuddikum Ullam. His seventh volume of poetry, Ithaya Osai, was published in 1960. His eighth volume of poetry, Manitha Chuvadu, was published in 1975. In 1976, he published Uruvaga Kathaiga, a collection of prose.

He was awarded the Cultural Medallion for Tamil literature in 1988. His poems were published in the Tamil Nesan, the Tamil Malar, and the Tamil Murasu. He also served as the proofreader of the Tamil Murasu.
