= LGBTQ literature in Singapore =

LGBTQ themes are found in Singaporean literature, including literary works of fiction, such as novels, short stories, plays and poems. It also includes non-fiction works, both scholarly and targeted at the general reader, such as dissertations, journal or magazine articles, books and even web-based content.

== Access ==
Although Singapore lacks a dedicated gay book publisher or gay bookshop, it does have at least one dedicated gay library, Pelangi Pride Centre, which is open weekly to the public.

== Plays ==
The increasing boldness of Singapore writers in sympathetically addressing LGBTQ themes is intertwined with the growth of English-language theatre from the mid-1980s. It was in theatre that writers first challenged the cultural taboo surrounding homosexuality. A fairly regular stream of gay plays were staged in Singapore throughout the 1990s, raising the public profile of sexual minorities.

- Lest the Demons Get To Me (1993) by Russell Heng depicts a dilemma in which a male-to-female transsexual resents having to dress up as a man to perform funeral rites as her dead father's only son.
- Private Parts (1994), a comedy by Michael Chiang, addresses the theme of Singapore society's capacity to come to terms with gender minorities in the form of transsexuals. The Straits Times reported that "Private Parts, with its remarkable performances and poignant message, is a special production that should not close until every person in this country has seen it". The play has also been performed in Mandarin.
- Invitation to Treat Trilogy by Eleanor Wong tells the story of Ellen Toh, a law partner, coming to terms with her homosexuality. The trilogy consists of Mergers and Accusations (1995), Wills and Secession (1996), and Jointly and Severably.
- Asian Boys Trilogy (2001–2007) features three disparate plays written by Alfian Sa'at and directed by Ivan Heng. The first installment, Asian Boys Vol.1 was staged in 2001 to rave reviews, not only on its artistic merit but also its relevance to the incumbent societal concerns. Following this was Landmarks: Asian Boys Vol.2, which premiered in 2004. A collection of eight short stories, this montage explores the myriad gay experiences of Singaporeans, albeit mostly clandestine. One of the stories, Katong Fugue, was made into a short film in 2006. Finally, the last of the trilogy, Happy Endings: Asian Boys Vol.3, played at the Drama Centre, at National Library, Singapore from 11 to 29 July 2007.

== Novels ==
Novels with LGBTQ themes began emerging in Singapore literature scene in the 1990s.

- Peculiar Chris (1992) by Johann S. Lee (Cannon International, 1992 ISBN 981-00-3557-8), follows a young athlete and national serviceman's angst-filled struggles with boyfriends, discriminatory institutions and death, as well as his coming out into the gay and lesbian community.
- Different Strokes (1993), by David Leo, portrays victims of AIDS
- Abraham’s Promise (1995) by Philip Jeyaretnam follows a father's rejection of and then coming to terms with his son's homosexuality. This is no exploration of the world of a gay man, for the homosexual character hardly speaks. Its intellectual touchstone is the political culture of post-colonial Singapore where many feel marginalised with little promise of respite in personal or professional life. (ISBN 0-8248-1769-9)
- Glass Cathedral (1995) by Andrew Koh (ISBN 978-981-08-9932-5)
- Bugis Street by Koh Buck Song.
- Different Strokes (1993) by David Leo. While David Leo wrote a homophobic short story in News at Nine, this book is based on an objective journalist's experience when he interviewed a gay AIDS patient. (ISBN 981-00-4755-X)
- Quiet Time (2008) by Johann S. Lee (Cannon International, 2008 ISBN 978-981-08-1703-9), The concluding part of Lee's Singaporean queer triptych which began with Peculiar Chris. About a gay man's paternal instincts and gay activism, set against the civil rights events of 2007.
- The Last Lesson of Mrs de Souza (2013) by Cyril Wong (ISBN 978-981-07-6232-2) is a quiet narrative with an unreliable narrator about a student coming out to a teacher, with disastrous consequences.

== Short stories ==
LGBTQ-themed stories are found in different collections of short stories. Examples are:

- Corridor: 12 Short Stories (1999) by Alfian Sa'at, (Raffles Editions ISBN 981-4032-40-9) contains several stories with LGBTQ themes. 'Pillow' looks at a difficult inter-generational relationship. 'Cubicle' is about the physical intimacy two lesbian students often steal in a public toilet. A flamboyant transvestite character appears in 'Bugis'. Finally, 'Disco' deals with an older man who is starting to discover the youth-dominated gay club scene. This book won the 1998 Singapore Literature Prize Commendation Award.
- Cross-straits experiences by Alfian Sa'at, simply titled "Bugis" in a Singapore-Malaysia collection, The Merlion and the Hibiscus.
- "Drum", a somewhat homophobic short story by David Leo in News at Nine which is modeled after Herman Melville's Billy Budd.
- Let Me Tell You Something About That Night, by Cyril Wong, a collection of surreal, urban to mythical fairy tales dealing with issues of queerness and desire, including a story that puts a gay twist on the Chinese myth about the Dragon King (2nd Edition published by Ethos Books in 2012). By the same author, Ten Things My Father Never Taught me and Other Stories, which includes both fictional and autobiographical stories about queer characters and growing up gay (published by Epigram Books in 2014 and launched at the Singapore Writers Festival).

== Poetry ==
Cyril Wong came out into the scene in 2000 with poetry that was confessional in style but universal in scope. Completely "out" in newspaper and magazine interviews, he is the first and only openly gay poet to win the National Arts Council's Young Artist Award for Literature and the Singapore Literature Prize. His poetry collections (including Unmarked Treasure, Tilting Our Plates to Catch the Light, and The Lover's Inventory) are published by Firstfruits, Ethos Books and Math Paper Press in Singapore.

Alvin Pang's "The Scent of the Real", refers to Wong's sexuality as a fact, not as something disgusting or abject. Toh Hsien Min and Yong Shu Hoong have written poems about friends coming out to them in "On a Good Friend's Admission that he is Gay" and "A Friend's Confession". Both were suspicious that their friends wanted sexual relations with them.

Gwee Li Sui in the eponymous book with the poem "Who wants to buy a book of Poems" refers to the stereotype used on poets as limp-wristed and "ah kua". In the poem, "Edward", he depicts the life of a cross-dresser during the time Bugis Street was being redeveloped.

Ng Yi-Sheng's poetry collection, last boy, contains many lyrical poems celebrating and reflecting on gay love and sexuality.

== On the Internet ==
- The Yawning Bread is a collection of essays on various topics, particularly Singapore LGBTQ issues. It was started in November 1996 by activist Alex Au and has grown to be an influential site for intellectual comment on gay issues in Singapore.
- Founded by Sean Foo, Dear Straight People is an LGBTQ media platform that first made a name of itself through its coming out stories. Over the years, it has gained prominence as one of Asia's leading LGBT publications.
