= AIPF =

AIPF may refer to:

- Asia Injury Prevention Foundation, a nonprofit organization based in Hanoi working to combat the growing traffic crisis in Southeast Asia
- Austin International Poetry Festival, an unjuried four-day poetry festival in Austin, Texas, that involved poetry readings, workshops, open mics, poetry slams, and haiku
- All in pre-flop, a state of play in the poker variation No Limit Texas hold 'em, meaning a player bets all of their money or chips on a hand before seeing any of the community cards
