= Aaron Maniam =

Singaporean academic, civil servant and poet

Aaron Shahril Yusoff Maniam
- Born: 1979 (age 46–47)
- Occupation: Academic
- Writing career
- Language: English

Aaron Shahril Yusoff Maniam (born 1979) is an academic, poet, and former civil servant. He is presently an academic with the Blavatnik School of Government at Oxford University and is a Senior Fellow for Advanced AI at the Centre for Future Generations, a Brussels-based think tank.

== Biography ==
Maniam attended Raffles Institution and Raffles Junior College, and was awarded the Singapore Public Service Commission’s Overseas Merit Scholarship in 1998. He graduated from Somerville College, Oxford, with double First Class Honours in Philosophy, Politics and Economics (PPE) in 2001. At Somerville, he was a Coombs Scholar and held the Mary Somerville prize for academic excellence. In 2000, he was President of the Oxford Economics Society in 2000. He went on to receive a Master of Arts degree in International and Development Economics from Yale University in 2002, and a PhD in Public Policy from Oxford University.

Maniam is an alumnus of the Gifted Education Programme, and the Creative Arts Programme (CAP) jointly organised by the Gifted Education Branch, Ministry of Education and NUS Centre for the Arts. He was mentored by Lee Tzu Pheng and Ho Poh Fun.

Maniam joined the Singapore government in 2004 where he first served with the North America Desk (2004–2006) and Singapore's Embassy in Washington DC (2006–2008). He was the principal coordinator for Congressional liaison and issues relating to the Middle East. In 2008, he was posted to the Strategic Policy Office (SPO) at the Public Service Division to work on scenario planning and analysing long-term trends relevant to Singapore. In January 2010, he was appointed the first Head of the Singapore Government’s Centre for Strategic Futures (CSF). He led a team that authored Conversations for the Future: Volume I, a history of Singapore's strategic planning from the 1980s and organised Singapore's inaugural “Foresight Conference” in October 2011.

In July 2011, Maniam was appointed Director of the Institute of Policy Development (later renamed the Institute of Public Sector Leadership) at the Civil Service College (CSC), and in 2012, he initiated the CSC Applied Simulation Training (CAST) Laboratory, an experiment to apply principles of “serious play” to training public officers to deal with complex environments. He subsequently served as Deputy Secretary at the Ministry of Communications and Information.

== Literary career ==
In 2003, Maniam won the First Prize for English poetry in the National Arts Council’s Golden Point Award. His first poetry collection, Morning at Memory’s Border, was shortlisted for the Singapore Literature Prize in 2007 and his second poetry collection, Second Persons, was published in 2018 under firstfruits publications.

His work has been featured in the online journals Stylus and Softblow; Over There, a collection of Singapore and Australian poetry; From the Window of Our Epoch, a bilingual collection of Singapore and Malaysian poetry; as well as&words and Little Things: A Poetry Anthology. In 2009, he was one of 50 poets featured in Fifty on 50, a collection to mark Singapore's 50th anniversary of internal self-government.

Maniam has read his poetry at the Austin International Poetry Festival and for Australia's ABC Radio. The French government invited him as a featured poet to the 35th Festival Franco-Anglais de Poésie in June 2011, and published his work in the bilingual journal La Traductiere as well as the French Journal des Poètes. In May 2014, he was one of the writers featured in the University of Hong Kong’s Becoming Poets: The Asian English Experience, which describes the creative process of a range of writers in various Asian countries. In August 2015, three of his poems were featured in From Walden to Woodlands, an anthology of interfaith nature poetry in Singapore.

== Works ==
Poetry:

- Morning at Memory's Border (firstfruits publications, 2005) ISBN 981-05-3610-0
- Second Persons (firstfruits publications, 2018) ISBN 978-981-11-5737-0
