= Nicky Moey =

Singaporean writer

- Born: 26 April 1964 (age 62); Singapore
- Citizenship: Singaporean
- Occupation: Writer
- Writing career
- Period: 1986 - 1992
- Notable work: Songs of Suspense

Nicky Moey is a Singaporean writer, best known for his collections of horror fiction and thriller stories.

== Early life and education ==
Moey was born on 26 April 1964. Growing up, he spent his leisure playing marbles, flying kites, catching fighting spiders and keeping a variety of pets, including aquarium fish. He studied at Sembawang Hills Estate School (1971–1976), Raffles Institution (1977–1980) and National Junior College (1981–1982). He graduated with a Bachelor of Science in physics from the National University of Singapore in 1989.

== Career ==
Moey took an interest in reading when he was fourteen, when he read The Hound of the Baskervilles by Sir Arthur Conan Doyle, and began writing stories at nineteen. After graduation, Moey worked as a feature writer in Shusse, a now-deregistered magazine publishing house, for a year.

In 1986 Moey published his first book, Let's Play Games to little fanfare. This collection of 13 short stories, which range from horror to crime to fantasy, was in 1990 re-issued as Pontianak: 13 Chilling Tales, with higher sales. The Singapore Police commissioned him to dramatise some of their cases, which were published in 1987 in the book, 999: True Cases from the CID, which was a national bestseller. He was chosen by Times Book International because of his unique and snappy narrative style. This was followed in 1988 by another collection of fiction stories, Sing a Song of Suspense, re-issued as Songs of Suspense in 1990.

In 1991, commissioned by the Shell Group of Companies in Singapore, Moey wrote their commemorative book, The Shell Endeavour: First 100 years in Singapore and a year later had his first novel Princess of Darkness published. In January 1994, he published his third collection of fiction stories, Army Ghost Stories and Other Tales. His 2003 collection Lurking In the Dark comprises three new stories, five stories from Sing a Song of Suspense and five from Army Ghost Stories and Other Tales.

In 2001, Moey was a featured writer in the Singapore Writers Festival, organised by the National Arts Council.

After a break, in 2014, The Travelling Companion and Other Stories, a collection of seven non-horror fiction stories, was published. It was regarded as milder and a "surprising diversion from his usual ghost and horror stories" by book reviewers. In 2017, Moey published Asian Ghost Stories: and More, a collection of some of the ghost stories from his earlier books.

Moey is regarded as one of the "most prominent and popular writers of the horror genre in the Singapore literary scene." Cyril Wong has compared his writing on supernatural elements to Stephen King, further commenting that Moey's horror books are good, and "about more existential things and growing up." Other reviewers have described him as having a "mastery of the macabre." His style has also been described as having a "satirist's touch" while weaving his storied with moral lessons through an eye for detail on traditional folklore and cultural superstitions.

== Personal life ==
Moey is married, and has a daughter, Nicolette Moey. He is a Christian, and his daughter studied in Marymount Convent School for Primary education.

== Works ==
- Moey, Nicky (1986). Let's us play games. Singapore: Times Books International. ISBN 9971-65-364-8. OCLC 18553553.
- Moey, Nicky (1990). Pontianak : 13 chilling tales (Rev. ed.). Singapore: Times Book International. ISBN 981-204-188-5. OCLC 26041422.
- Moey, Nicky (1991). The Shell endeavour : first 100 years in Singapore. [Singapore]: Designed and published for Shell Companies in Singapore by Times Editions Pte. Ltd. ISBN 981-204-307-1. OCLC 29415799.
- Moey, Nicky (1992). Princess of darkness. Singapore: Times Books International. ISBN 981-204-371-3. OCLC 27801146.
- The Lake (1992, unpublished short story)
- Moey, Nicky (1994). Army ghost stories : and other tales. Singapore: Promethean Integrated. ISBN 981-00-5301-0. OCLC 31882484.
- Moey, Nicky (2000). 999 : true cases from the CID. Singapore: Times Books International. ISBN 981-204-204-0. OCLC 53811652.
- Moey, Nicky (2003). Lurking in the dark : 13 tales of terror. Singapore: Promethean Integrated. ISBN 981-04-8954-4. OCLC 52943812.
- Moey, Nicky (2014). The travelling companion and other stories. Singapore. ISBN 978-981-09-1132-4. OCLC 900138518.
- Moey, Nicky (2017). Asian Ghost Stories: and More. Singapore: Popular. ISBN 9789811139925. OCLC 1009362216.
