= Unmarked Treasure =

Poetry book by Cyril Wong

- First edition
- Author: Cyril Wong
- Language: English
- Publisher: Firstfruits Publications and Math Paper Press
- Publication date: 2004 and 2012
- Publication place: Singapore
- Pages: 111
- ISBN: 978-981-05-0408-3

Unmarked Treasure is a poetry collection by the Singaporean poet Cyril Wong, held together by memories about family life and intimate relationships, charged with intense emotions surrounding love, death and exploration of an emptiness within the self.

This book marks the first time that an openly gay poet has won both the National Young Artist Award for Literature and the Singapore Literature Prize. As commented on by the poet/playwright Robert Yeo, the book contains "poems about parental displeasure and homosexual relations" but the work also allows the author "to deliberately blur distinctions between the real (Cyril Wong) and the persona (the poet who 'wonders at his own existence'.) The result is a distancing that layers the poems and renders them more fraught and complex and encourages, indeed demands, repeated reading."

== See also ==
- Singapore gay literature
