= This Is What Inequality Looks Like =

Anthology of essays on inequality in Singapore

- Author: Teo You Yenn
- Language: English
- Subject: Sociology
- Publisher: Ethos Books
- Publication date: January 2018
- Publication place: Singapore
- Pages: 288
- Awards: Singapore Literature Prize Creative Nonfiction Shortlist
- ISBN: 978-981-14-3749-6
- Website: https://teoyouyenn.sg/this-is-what-inequality-looks-like/

This is What Inequality Looks Like is an anthology of essays related to inequality in Singapore written by associate professor of sociology at the Nanyang Technological University, Teo You Yenn, drawing on interviews and experiences with low-income Singaporeans over the period of three years. It was published in January 2018.

== Background ==
Initially, Teo had wanted to write a book on poverty in Singapore, but as she conducted her research, she took note of the contrasts between the lives of low-income individuals and her own. Eventually, she decided to write the book to be about inequality. As research for the book, Teo interviewed over 200 individuals from families in low-income residential areas. These interviews spanned over three years, and in total she made 90 visits to the families, each lasting around three hours.

== Synopsis ==
This is What Inequality Looks Like is an ethnographic study of low-income individuals and families in Singapore. The book contains 12 essays, written as chapters. It recounts the experiences of both the poor in Singapore as well as social service workers who have interests in the poor. It also provides commentary on the experiences, challenging national narratives of the economy of Singapore, and puts forth policy suggestions to reduce the effect of inequality in a social democratic manner. In an appendix on the research methodology used, Teo stated that she avoided using surveys, interviews, and quantitative methods, choosing instead to rely on casual conversation.

== Reception and legacy ==
The book is a best seller in Singapore, selling over 20,000 copies and lasting 38 weeks on The Straits Times bestsellers list. It was referenced in Parliament by Nominated Member of Parliament Kuik Shiao-Yin in 2018. As a result of the book, Teo was nominated for The Straits Times Singaporean of the Year award. It was shortlisted for the 2020 Singapore Literature Prize Creative Nonfiction Award.
