= Stroke (disambiguation) =

A stroke (a "brain stroke" or "brain attack") is a medical condition in which poor blood flow to the brain results in cell death.

Stroke or stroking may also refer to:

== Arts, entertainment, and media ==
- Stroke (composition), a 2010 orchestral composition by Joan Tower
- Stroke (film), a 1992 Canadian short film
- Stroke (journal), a cardiology journal
- Stroke: Songs for Chris Knox, a 2009 benefit compilation album
- "The Stroke", a 1981 song by Billy Squier
- The Strokes, a rock band
- "Stroke", a 2019 song by Banks from III
- "Strokin'", a 1986 song by Clarence Carter
- "Stroke" (poem), a 1965 poem by Vincent Buckley

== Health conditions ==
- Myocardial infarction or heart stroke
- Heat stroke, a condition caused by overexposure to the sun

== Sports ==
- Rowing stroke, the action of moving an oar through the water to propel a boat forward
- Stroke (position), in the sport of rowing, the rower seated closest to the stern
- Stroke, a scuba diver who is not following the rules of Doing It Right
- Stroke play, a scoring system used in golf
- Swimming stroke, a swimming style

== Writing and graphics ==
- Stroke (CJK character), part of a Chinese character
- Stroke, a trace of ink in handwriting
- Stroke, a line that makes up part or all of a letter in typeface anatomy
- Stroke, one of the two basic methods of drawing a path in vector graphics
- Bar (diacritic) or stroke, a line drawn across a grapheme.
- Slash (punctuation), the typographical character, is also known as a "stroke"

== Other uses ==
- Stroke (engine), a single action of some engines
- Stroke, the recognition, attention or responsiveness that one person gives another in transactional analysis

== See also ==
- Different Strokes (disambiguation)
