= Lions in Winter =

Book by Wena Poon

- First edition
- Language: English
- Publication date: 2007

Lions in Winter is the debut collection of short stories by Singapore-born, United States-based writer Wena Poon. The book was first published in 2007 by MPH Group Publishing.

The collection was a Straits Times best-seller in Singapore. It was longlisted for the 2008 Frank O'Connor International Short Story Award and shortlisted for the 2008 Singapore Literature Prize.

The collection contains 11 short stories which touch on Singaporeans and former Singaporeans making a living in the West.

The short stories are:

- "Kenny's Big Break"
- "The Man who was Scared of ATMs"
- "Addiction"
- "Those Who Serve, Those Who Do not"
- "Lions in Winter"
- "Dog Hot Pot"
- "The Shooting Ranch"
- "The Move"
- "The Toys"
- "The Hair-Washing Girl"
- "Mrs. Chan's Wedding Dinner"
