= Philip Kim =

Phil, Phillip or Philip Kim may refer to:

- Phillip Y. Kim (born 1961), American writer
- Philip Kim (physicist) (born 1968), South Korean-American recipient of Oliver E. Buckley Prize
- Philip Kim (breakdancer) (born 1997), Canadian 2024 Olympic gold medalist, a/k/a Phil Wizard
- Phil Kim, South Korean motor racer who competed in 2021 and 2022 Superrace Championship
