= Paul Tan (poet) =

Singaporean poet

Paul Tan Kim Liang
- Born: 1970 (age 55–56)
- Occupations: Writer, Deputy Chief Executive of National Arts Council
- Writing career
- Language: English

Paul Tan Kim Liang (born 1970) is a Singaporean poet and current deputy chief executive of the National Arts Council (NAC) of Singapore.

== Biography ==
Tan only started writing poetry seriously during National Service. He attained his Bachelor of Arts (Second Upper Honours) in English Language and Literature from the National University of Singapore. During his undergraduate years, Tan won consecutive first prizes in the NUS Literary Society poetry competition in 1992 and 1993. He graduated with a Master of Arts in culture and communications from the University of East Anglia in 2004.

He worked as a broadcast journalist with the Television Corporation of Singapore (now Mediacorp). He then worked as Deputy Head, Editorial Promotion and Branding with the Singapore Press Holdings between 2004 and 2007. He also served as the Director (Strategic Marketing and Communications) in the Singapore Tourism Board until 31 January 2011. He was appointed as the festival director of the Singapore Writers Festival (SWF) in 2010 and served as the festival director of the SWF between 2011 and 2014, handing the position over to poet Yeow Kai Chai. He was then appointed as the NAC's deputy chief executive, taking over from Yvonne Tham.

== Literary career ==
Tan's early work has been described as having "a unique disposition for observation and reflection, with the occasional cheekiness and lightly interrogative gesture." His first poetry collection, Curious Roads (1994), won the Commendation award at the Singapore Literature Prize 1993. Curious Roads focuses largely on the poet's growing up years and his time during national service and has been described as "personal".

Tan's second poetry collection, Driving Into Rain (1998), won the Merit award at the Singapore Literature Prize 1997. His second collection seeks to project the poet's relationship with the larger world and according to poet Dr Cyril Wong, "regularly stops short of divulging enough about the poet’s persona for readers to enter a more rewarding and connective relationship with the poetry".

Tan's third collection, First Meeting of Hands, represented a departure from his previous style of writing and contains poems that "achieve a balance between social critique and the characterisation of a distinct and authentic—even if disillusioned and resentful—Singaporean voice".

Tan has also penned the lyrics to the National Day Parade 2012 song "Love at First Light", composed by Iskandar Ismail, and sung by Olivia Ong and Natanya Tan.

Tan's fifth collection, When the lights went off, captures the sentiment of middle age and the poet's changing priorities towards love and mortality.

== Works ==
=== Poetry ===
Title	Year	Publisher	ISBN
Curious Roads	1994	EPB Publishers	ISBN 9971005743
Driving Into Rain	1998	Raffles Editions	ISBN 9971008548
First Meeting of Hands	2006	firstfruits	ISBN 9810563108
Seasonal Disorders/Impractical Lessons	2014	firstfruits	ISBN 9789814189545
When the Lights Went Off	2018	Landmark Books	ISBN 9789814189866

=== Short stories ===
Title	Venue	Year
Jasmine's Father	Quarterly Literary Review Singapore	2001
The Oriental Grocer	Quarterly Literary Review Singapore	2006
