= Tilting Our Plates to Catch the Light =

- Author: Cyril Wong
- Language: English
- Publisher: Firstfruits Publications and Math Paper Press
- Publication date: 2007 and 2012
- Publication place: Singapore
- Pages: 101
- ISBN: 978-981-05-9385-8

Tilting Our Plates to Catch the Light is a poetry collection by the Singaporean poet Cyril Wong about "two lovers who are in the process of losing each other," bringing into play his background in music, intermingling the lives of gay male-partners with the tribulations of lovers distant and near, including the romance between "two shape-shifting Hindu deities", Shiva and Mohini (the female-incarnation of Vishnu). It brings into focus the experience of living with H.I.V. within the homosexual context. The book was chosen by The Straits Times as among the best five books of 2007 and described by the reviewer as "a luminous symphony".

== See also ==
- Singapore gay literature
- Cyril Wong
