= Colin Cheong =

Singaporean writer and teacher

Colin Cheong Wye Mun (Zhen Wai Mung) is a Singapore writer born in 1965. He has written or edited nearly 30 books, four of which have won national awards. He won the Singapore Literature Prize in 1996 for his novel, Tangerine.

== Early life and education ==
The older of three children born to two teachers, Cheong attended Victoria School, Anderson Secondary School, Hwa Chong Junior College, Ngee Ann Polytechnic and National University of Singapore.

At the age of 15, he interned at the now defunct newspaper New Nation and contributed to an army magazine, Pioneer, during his National Service days. From Secondary 3 till the year before he graduated from university, he was a photographer and stage actor. Furthermore, he has shown keen interests in Science, eugenics in particular. These experiences had significant influence on his future writing.

== Career ==
=== Teaching career ===
Cheong had previously taught at Victoria Junior College, Hwa Chong Junior College, and School of the Arts. He compiled books for corporate clients on his days off. He is also an editor of the One Association magazine.

Cheong currently teaches Theory of Knowledge, English Language & Literature and Literature in the International Baccalaureate Diploma Programme at Singapore International School in Hong Kong.

In January 2025, Cheong launched a YouTube channel titled "The Colin Cheong Collection", which features literature work analysis to assist students.

=== Writing career ===
In 1989, Cheong published his first novel, The stolen child : a first novel. The novel was highly commended during the National Book Development Council Singapore's 1990 awards.

In 1990, Cheong published his second novel, Poets, Priests & Prostitutes.

== Personal life ==
Cheong has a son who is a film director, and a daughter. Cheong is an active cosplayer and is interested in Japanese culture. He used to study ballet at Singapore ballet academy.

== Works ==
- Cheong, Colin (1989). The stolen child: a first novel. Singapore: Times Books International.
- Cheong, Colin (1990). Poets, priests and prostitutes: a rock fairytale. Singapore: Times Books Internat. ISBN 978-981-204-152-4.
- Blinken, James (1991)
- Life Cycle of Homo Sapiens, Male (1992)
- Seventeen (1996)
- Pictures of the Unsaid (1996)
- Void Decks and Other Empty Places (1996) - Singapore Literature Prize Commendation 1995
- For Gail (1996)
- Tangerine (1997) - Singapore Literature Prize 1996
- Living on Pryston (1998)
- The Man in the Cupboard (1999) - Singapore Literature Prize 1998; adapted into a TV movie for the series AlterAsians II
- Polite Fiction (2011)
- The Verifiable (2011)
- McKenzie's Question (2011)
- School of the arts Literature review paper exercise (2011)
- Earthly Locks (2012)
- Compilation of Shakespeare reviews (On audio, purchase on Amazon.com) ( 2013)
