= Tania De Rozario =

Singaporean writer and visual artist

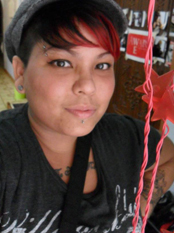
- Born: 20 February 1982 (age 44); Singapore
- Education: BA (Fine Art), RMIT (Australia)
- Occupations: Visual artist and writer
- Writing career
- Notable awards: Georgette Chen Arts Scholarship (Singapore, 2000), Winston Oh Travel Award (SouthEast Asia, 2001), National Arts Council Golden Point Award (2011), National Arts Council Arts Creation Fund (2012)

Tania De Rozario (born 20 February 1982) is a writer and visual artist, generally emphasising themes of gender, sexuality, loving and losing.

== Biography ==
Tania De Rozario was born on 20 February 1982. Tania De Rozario has showcased her visual art at spaces such as the Esplanade, The Substation, as well as the Singapore Philatelic Museum. She is also the co-founder/curator of Etiquette, Singapore's first annual arts event focused on feminist issues.

Tania is a 2011 Hedgebrook alumna and winner of the National Arts Council Golden Point Award for English poetry (2011). Her poetry and prose can be found on the Santa Fe Writers Project, SOFTBLOW, Moving Words Journal, Quarterly Literary Review Singapore and GASPP: A Gay Anthology of Singapore Poetry & Prose.

As an art educator, Tania De Rozario teaches drawing at The Substation and tutors in Contemporary Contextual Studies at LASALLE College of the Arts.

She has been involved with curatorial projects such as Sugar & Spice – A Literary Showcase (part of AWARE), and was a featured author in Singapore Writers Festival 2012.

Of her art, Tania De Rozario states that she has "always been interested in starting conversations about sex, gender and sexuality through art and writing. . .the quickest way to engage people is to come from personal places of love, loss and desire. . .when people are able to relate to certain common aspects of relationships, gender becomes a secondary issue." Tania adds that she wishes to "create spaces in which people can approach gender and sexuality from points of commonality, not difference."

In 2014, Tania's Tender Delirium (Math Paper Press, 2013) was shortlisted for the Singapore Literature Prize. The book is "a confessional collection of poems and short prose about estranged lovers, despairing mothers, queer desire and obsessive longing."

== Selected publications ==
- Dinner on Monster Island: Essays (Harper Perennial, 2024) ISBN 0063299666
- Somewhere Else, Another You (Math Paper Press, 2018) ISBN 9789811186639
- And the Walls Come Crumbling Down (Math Paper Press, 2016) ISBN 9789810983697
- Tender Delirium (Math Paper Press, 2013) ISBN 9789810747831
- "My Jericho", GASPP: Gay Anthology of Singapore Poetry & Prose, Oct 2010

== Awards ==
- SPH-NAC Golden Point Award – Winner (English Poetry), 2011
- Writer-In-Residence, Hedgebrook, (Washington State), 2011
