= Nothing Gained =

2013 novel by Phillip Y. Kim

First edition

Nothing Gained is a novel written by investment banker Phillip Y. Kim. It was first published by Penguin Australia in association with Penguin China in 2013.

== The Book ==
Nothing Gained is a financial thriller set largely in Asia, with flashbacks to New York and with a trip through Europe as well. It is truly international in terms of setting and characters. The book is largely based on the real life world of investment banking that author Phillip Y. Kim has inhabited for over twenty-five years whilst working at companies such as Lehman Brothers and Morgan Stanley.

Hong Kong features significantly in the novel with specific reference to locations and brands that exist in real life. Underlying themes of the novel include moral responsibility in the corporate and financial world. Food and beverages feature prominently in the novel partly due to the author’s gastronomical interest, and partly as something that goes hand-in-hand with the business of entertaining in the world portrayed in Nothing Gained. Travel also features prominently.

Phillip Y. Kim initially self-published Nothing Gained under a different title before it was acquired by Penguin Books (China).
