= Wena Poon =

American novelist

Wena Poon (方慧娜, born 1974) is a lawyer and novelist based in the United States. She writes English-language fiction. Her work has been seen by academics in the UK, US and Singapore as representative of the transnationalism of her generation.

== Biography ==
Poon began writing novels and plays in her early teens. She obtained her degrees in English literature and law from Harvard University. She is a corporate finance lawyer by profession. Born and raised in Singapore, she has lived in Hong Kong, New York, Boston, San Francisco and Austin. Her family is of Chinese Teochew descent and has lived in Singapore for five generations. According to Poon her grandmother and the story of her family as well as her home country during WWII served as a major inspiration to her as a writer. She speaks English, French, Mandarin, Teochew, Cantonese and Hokkien and reads Japanese script. These languages are sometimes used in her English-language fiction. She claimed that she had grown up with multilingual radio broadcasts and television series including M*A*S*H. Poon herself described her childhood as "audio-visual". She is a photography enthusiast and has incorporated some of her photographs as illustration to her novella "Kami and Kaze". Poon is also a fan of anime, manga as well as the works of the film director and actor Takeshi Kitano.

== Literary prizes ==
Since her first book was released in 2008, Poon has won the Willesden Herald Short Story Prize (UK), and has been nominated for the Frank O'Connor Award (Ireland), Le Prix Hemingway (France), the Bridport Prize in Poetry (UK), the Singapore Literature Prize, and the Popular Readers Award (Malaysia).

== Short fiction collections ==
Lions in Winter (2007) portrays the Singapore Chinese diaspora in America, Canada, Australia and England. It was published in the US and Europe by Salt Publishing London and in Asia by MPH Group Publishing. It was a Straits Times best-seller in Singapore, was longlisted for the 2008 Frank O'Connor International Short Story Award and shortlisted for the 2008 Singapore Literature Prize.

In 2009, Poon released The Proper Care of Foxes. Using Voltaire's "Il fault cultiver notre jardin" as a theme, the stories take place in Singapore, Hanoi, Hong Kong, London, New York, and Palo Alto. The title story is about a high-flying young London banker who was laid off during the recession and his chance encounter with an old classmate from Malaysia. Published by Ethos Books, it earned her a second longlist nomination for the Frank O'Connor International Short Story Award and another nomination for the Singapore Literature Prize.

In 2013, Poon released Maxine, Aoki, Beto + Me, her third short fiction collection featuring stories and her black and white photographs from around the world. Most of the stories have been previously published in international literary anthologies and journals in 2010–2012, including "The Architects", winner of the Willesden Herald Prize in London and "Dialogue Between Novillera and Minotaur", shortlisted for the Prix Hemingway in France.

== Theater ==
Poon's novel Alex y Robert was commissioned by a Singapore theatre director originally for the stage. It was acquired by BBC Radio 4 and made into a 10 episode radio drama starring veteran BBC American actress Lorelei King. A short story spinoff from Alex y Robert, Dialogue Between Novillera & Minotaur, was translated in French and performed in the ancient Roman amphitheater in Nimes, France. It was shortlisted for France's Hemingway Prize and later published by Avocats du Diable in a French anthology called Pas De Deux (September 2011).

Poon's great-granduncle was the head of a Chinese Teochew opera troupe in Malaysia during the golden era of Chinese opera in the 1930s. Poon incorporated Teochew opera in her latest English play The Wood Orchid, which was performed at Westminster Abbey, London, as part of the Bush Theatre's October 2011 project "Sixty Six Books". The authentic Chinese opera costumes in the play were sourced from Manchester. The play is for 4 actors, based upon a chapter of the King James Bible. The title refers to Hua Mulan, the Chinese woman warrior. The play was published by Oberon Books London in a book called 66 Books: 21st Century Writers speak to the King James Bible (October 2011).

== Novels ==
In 2016, Poon released 4 new novels, among which are "Chang'an: A Story of China & Japan" (長安), about a Mandarin-speaking Japanese army doctor who hides in Communist China for decades as a Chinese man, and "Shonanto no Ramen" (吃麵民族), about the shared love of ramen noodles between the Chinese and the Japanese, set against the backdrop of war during the Japanese occupation of Singapore. The novels explore the history of China and Japan's intimate but fractious relationship.

Poon is bilingual and writes in English. However, "Shonanto no Ramen" is her first book written in both English and Chinese.

In 2015, Poon published a novel, "Cafe Jause: A Story of Viennese Shanghai", about a Viennese cafe run by Hungarian and Viennese Jews in 1936 Shanghai. It was launched at the China Bookworm Literary Festival in Beijing, Chengdu and Suzhou. In 2014, Poon released a novel called "Kami and Kaze" (神と風). Set in 1948 Kyoto, the novel is about the American occupation of Japan and the relationship between an Allied administrator, Kate Schroeder, and her young Japanese driver, Nakamura Shinji. It examines white racism against the Japanese and the power of the words "kamikaze" in the Western imagination.

Poon's 2010 novel, Alex y Robert, is a 21st-century novel about a young woman from Texas who goes to Spain to break into the male-dominated world of bullfighting. It was adapted by BBC Radio 4 for serialisation over two weeks for its Book at Bedtime radio show. The series ran from 6–17 September 2010. Alex y Robert was launched on 12 July at the London Literature Festival to favourable reviews.

In 2013, Poon released the sequel to Alex y Robert called Novillera. The novel comments on gender, tradition and modernity and explores the ancient bull ranching culture of Spain.

In 2012–2015, Poon wrote a trilogy of Chinese-Japanese sword-fighting novels as a humorous, modern response to classical Ming plays, Kun opera, wuxia television shows, and samurai films. They are published as "The Adventures of Snow Fox & Sword Girl", "Voyage to the Dark Kirin", and "The Marquis of Disobedience". The trilogy is a rumination on the history of the Chinese diaspora and their idea of a mythic China. It also examines the warrior or bushido code and its meaning for modern society and for women.

In 2009, Poon published four novels in her New York sci-fi series, The Biophilia Omnibus. During Christmas 2009, CNN's online magazine voted it the Best Book Gift of the Year in Singapore. The New Straits Times compared Biophilia to the works of film director Terry Gilliam in its book review. The series has been exhibited at the Alternative Press Expo in San Francisco.

== Poetry ==
Poon's poetry has been published in anthologies, magazines and newspapers in Asia and Australia. In 2010, she was shortlisted for the Bridport Poetry Prize in the UK.

== Education and writing fellowships ==
Poon graduated magna cum laude and Phi Beta Kappa from Harvard University with an honours degree in English Literature. She received a Juris Doctor degree from Harvard Law School and continues to practice law. In Singapore, she attended Nanyang Girls Primary, Raffles Girls Primary, Raffles Girls School and Raffles Junior College, where she was a Humanities Scholar. She was in the Gifted Education Program in Singapore. She is a fellow of the Hawthornden Castle writing fellowship in Scotland, and a visiting fellow of the International Writing Workshop of Hong Kong Baptist University. In 2011, she was awarded a writer's residency by French literary press Avocats du Diable in the bullfighting region of southern France.

== Bibliography ==
- "Still Two Hundred Miles of Deep Wood to Chang'an", in "Manoa Journal: Starry Island: New Writing from Singapore", University of Hawaii Press, Hawaii, August 2014.
- "Shotaro and Haruka", in The Lion & the Aardvark, Stoneskin Press, London, November 2012.
- "The Wood Orchid", in Sixty-Six Books: 21st Century Writers speak to the King James Bible, Oberon Books London, October 2011.
- "Maxine, Aoki, Beto and Me", and "Fideua", both in Asia Literary Review, Hong Kong, June and September 2011.
- "The Architects", in Willesden Herald New Short Stories 4, edited by Stephen Moran, Pretend Genius Press, USA, April 2010.
- "Camera Obscura" in Riptide: Short Stories with an Undercurrent, Vol. 5, edited by Jane Feaver, University of Exeter, UK, 2010
- "Justin & the Cenotaph", "The Man Who Was Afraid of ATMs", and "Kenny's Big Break" in Telltale: 11 Stories, edited by Dr Gwee Li Sui, Ethos Books Singapore, July 2010, an official Cambridge O Level Text in Singapore
- "Justin & the Cenotaph", Notes From The Underground, a short story magazine distributed on the London Tube, UK, 2009.
- "Mrs Chan's Wedding Day", in Quarterly Literary Review of Singapore, edited by Toh Hsien Min, Singapore, 2002, subsequently reprinted in An Historical Anthology of Literature in Singapore, edited by Angelia Poon, NUS Press, 2009.
- "The Move", in The Merlion & The Hibiscus, edited by Dipika Mukherjee, Kirpal Singh, M.A. Quayum, Penguin Books, India, 2002, subsequently reprinted in the following anthologies: Island Voices: A Collection of Short Stories from Singapore, edited by Angelia Poon, Sim Wai Chew, Learners Publishing, 2007 (textbook)
- "Lions In Winter", reprinted in English Empowers Learners textbook, by PanPac Education, 2010.
- "Starfish", in Tumasik: Contemporary Writing from Singapore, edited by Alvin Pang, USA 2009, published by the International Writing Program at the University of Iowa.
- "Kenny's Big Break", in Silverfish New Writing – Collateral Damage, edited by Sharon Bakar, Silverfishbooks Kuala Lumpur, Malaysia, 2004; a shorter version of which appeared in:
- KrisFlyer – The Magazine of Singapore Airlines, 2003.
- "Dog Hot Pot", in Silverfish New Writing, Silverfishbooks, Kuala Lumpur, Malaysia, 2007.
- "Addiction", in Silverfish New Writing 6, edited by Dipika Mukherjee, Silverfishbooks Kuala Lumpur, Malaysia, 2006
- "Those Who Serve; Those Who Do Not", in From Boyz II Men: A Literary Anthology of National Service in Singapore, edited by Koh Buck Song and Umej Bhatia, Landmark Books, Singapore, 2003
- "The Man Who Was Afraid of ATMs", in Yuan Yang – A Journal of Hong Kong and International Writing, Hong Kong University, Hong Kong, 2004
- "New Order", in Quarterly Literary Review of Singapore, edited by Toh Hsien Min, Singapore, 2009.

Wena Poon's poetry has appeared in the following publications:

- Readings on Readings: New Malaysia Writing, ed. Sharon Bakar and Bernice Chauly, "On Riding the Eastern & Oriental Express between Singapore and Malaysia", Malaysia, February 2011.
- Asian Cha, "Copernicus for an Asian Grandmother", Hong Kong, 2010
- Stylus Poetry Journal, "Guo Jia/Country Family", October 2004
- Bangladesh Daily Star, Sunday Times Literary Supplement, "Bury", Vol. 5 Num. 348, 21 May 2005.
