= You Jin =

- 尤今
- Born: Tham Yew Chin; 1950 (age 75–76); Ipoh, British Malaya
- Education: Nanyang University
- Occupation: Writer
- Writing career
- Language: Chinese, English
- Period: 1970-present
- Genre: Novel
- Notable works: Jinse Daishu; Release Your Happiness; Even The Heart Soars

Chinese name
- Chinese: 尤今
Transcriptions
Standard Mandarin
- Hanyu Pinyin: Yóu Jīn

Alternative Chinese name
- Traditional Chinese: 譚幼今
- Simplified Chinese: 谭幼今
Transcriptions
Standard Mandarin
- Hanyu Pinyin: Tán Yòujīn
- Wade–Giles: Tham Yew Chin

Tham Yew Chin (Chinese: 谭幼今; born 1950), known by her pseudonym You Jin (尤今), is a Singaporean writer. She received the Cultural Medallion Award in 2009 for her contributions to Singapore's literary arts scene.

== Early life and family ==
Tham was born 1950 in Ipoh, British Malaya. Her family relocated to Singapore when she was eight years old. Moving to Singapore, she suffered from a language barrier as she only spoke Cantonese. Her father was a construction worker, and her paternal grandfather was an immigrant from then-poverty-torn China.

== Career ==
Tham has published close to 160 literary works under the pseudonym of You Jin. In 2009, she received the Cultural Medallion in literary arts for the first time. Tham contributed an essay titled A Fish in Water for former Prime Minister of Singapore Lee Kuan Yew's 2012 book, My Lifelong Challenge: Singapore's Bilingual Journey.

In 2012, Tham's writing was translated into English for the first time. Her 2004 collection of short stories, 听, 青春在哭泣 : 短篇小说, was translated by Sylvia Li-chun Lin and published by Epigram Books as Teaching Cats to Jump Hoops as part of its Cultural Medallion series. Her 2005 autobiography, A Life in Words (文字就是生命} was then translated by Shelly Bryant and published in 2016 by the same company, marking the fourth time she would win the award.

In 2014, three of Tham's books, Jinse Daishu (金色袋鼠), Release Your Happiness (释放快乐) and Even The Heart Soars (心也飞翔), entered the Singapore Literature Prize shortlist for Chinese fiction and non-fiction. Eventually, Even The Heart Soars (心也飞翔) won a merit award for Chinese non-fiction.

== Awards ==
- 1982: National Book Development Council of Singapore Book Award
- 1991: National Book Development Council of Singapore Book Award
- 1991: Singapore Chinese Literary Award (from the Singapore Literature Society)
- 1996: Montblanc-NUS Centre for the Arts Literary Award
- 2009: Cultural Medallion for Literature

== Selected works ==
- 词选赏析 (1973, 华文中学教师会)
- 电神和雷魔 : 泰国民间故事 / The Tale of Lightning and Thunder (1980, 彩艺出版公司)
- 大胡子的春与冬 (1989, 新亚出版社) ISBN 9971803984
- 风筝在云里笑 (1989, 东升出版社, 热带出版社) ISBN 7536013183
- 尘世浮雕 (1990, 成功出版社) ISBN 9813088192
- 含笑的蜻蜓 (1991, 教育出版公司) ISBN 9971002469
- 方格子里的世界 : 尤今的足迹 (1992, 四川文艺出版社) ISBN 7541109312
- 灯影內的人生 : 尤今散文选粹 (1992, 四川文艺出版社) ISBN 9787541109164
- 百年苦乐 (1993, 新亚出版社) ISBN 997180767X
- 家在新加坡 : 尤今散文新作 (1993, 四川文艺出版社) ISBN 7541110620
- 结局 (1993, 吉林人民出版社) ISBN 978-7-206-01902-9
- 活在羊群里的人 (1994, 新亚出版社) ISBN 9971807904
- 长屋生涯原是梦 (1995, 浙江文艺出版社) ISBN 7533908155
- 瑰丽的旋涡 (1995, 教育出版公司) ISBN 9971005514
- 回首叫云飞风起 (1995, 浙江文艺出版社) ISBN 7533908384
- 跌碎的彩虹 (1996, 教育出版公司) ISBN 9971007460
- 华义文圃. 第十期, 学海无涯 (1997, 华义中学中文学会) OCLC 426281524 ISSN 0129-0983
- 荒谷 (1997, 新亚出版社) ISBN 9812252533
- 大地的珠宝 (1998, 新亚出版社) ISBN 978-981-225-346-0
- 黑色的稻米 (1999, 2000, SNP Editions) ISBN 9971010364
- 吹笛子的人 (2001, 重庆出版社) ISBN 753665233X
- 豆花不撒谎 (2005, 玲子传媒) ISBN 9814157562
- 大地的耳朵 (2007, 玲子传媒) ISBN 9789814200585
- 缤纷城事 (2008, 四川人民出版社) ISBN 9787220074981
- 缤纷城事 : 随尤今的足迹, 听都市的声音 (2008, 玲子传媒) ISBN 9789814243063
- 爱恨交缠的瘀痕 (2010, Pearson Education South Asia Pte Ltd) ISBN 9789810626525
- 爱是一朵花 (2010, 江苏文艺出版社) ISBN 9787539936345
- 寸寸土地皆故事 (2010, 新加坡青年书局) ISBN 9789810864132
- 等待国旗的人 (2010, 新加坡青年书局) ISBN 9789810864125
