= Boey Kim Cheng =

Singapore-born Australian poet

Boey K. Cheng
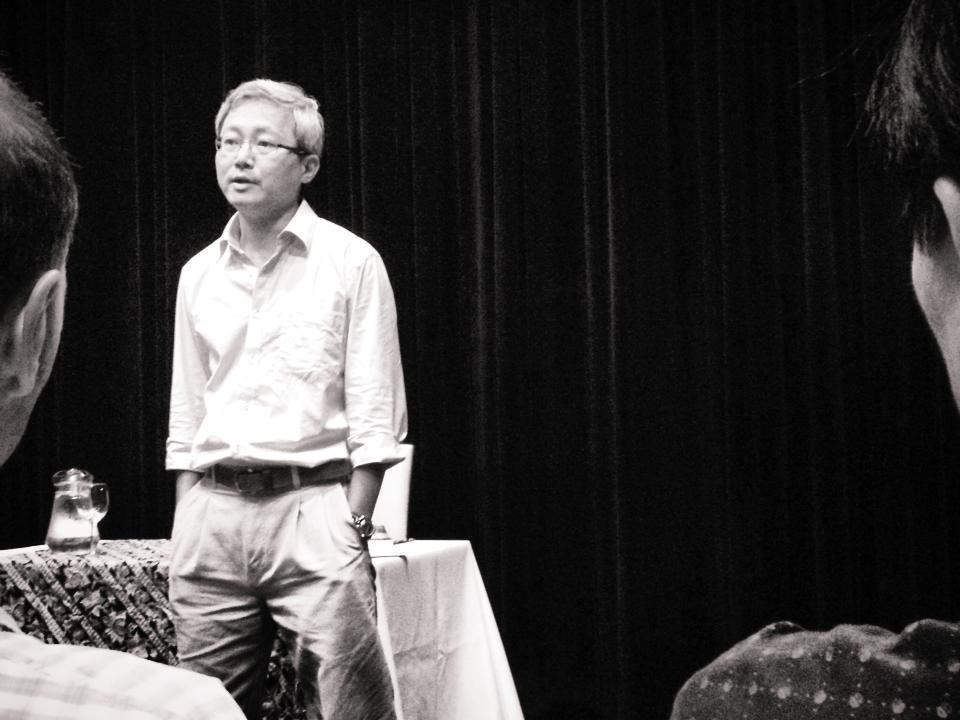
- Poet Boey Kim Cheng at Nanyang Technological University, 2013
- Born: 1965 (age 60–61); Singapore
- Education: National University of Singapore
- Occupations: Poet, Teacher

Boey Kim Cheng (梅健青; born 1965) is a Singaporean Australian poet.

As a student, Boey won the National University of Singapore Poetry Writing/Creative Prose Competition and has since received the National Arts Council's Young Artist Award (1996). He taught creative writing at the University of Newcastle in Australia from 2003 to 2016. In 2016, Boey joined the Nanyang Technological University, where he was associate professor at the School of Humanities, but stepped down as Head of its English department in 2020.

== Early life ==
Boey was born in Singapore in 1965. He received his secondary education at Victoria School and graduated with Bachelor of Arts and Masters of Arts degrees in English Literature from the National University of Singapore. In 1993, he won a scholarship from the Goethe-Institut to pursue German. He was sponsored by the United States Information Agency to attend the International Writing Program at the University of Iowa. Boey embarked on a doctoral program with the National University of Singapore which he later discontinued. He entered the workforce and was employed by the Ministry of Community Development as a probation officer.

Disillusioned with the state of literary and cultural politics in Singapore, Boey left for Sydney with his wife in 1997 and became an Australian citizen. He completed his PhD studies with Macquarie University.

== Career and achievements ==
In 1987, while studying as an undergraduate, Boey won the first and second prizes at the National University of Singapore Poetry Writing/Creative Prose Competition. At age 24, he published his first collection of poetry. Somewhere-Bound went on to win the National Book Development Councils (NBDCS) Book Award for Poetry in 1992. Two years later, his second volume of poems Another Place received the commendation award at the NBDCS Book Awards. In 1995, Days Of No Name, which was inspired by the people whom he met in the United States, was awarded a merit at the Singapore Literature Prize. In recognition of his artistic talent and contributions, Boey received the National Arts Council's Young Artist Award in 1996. After a long hiatus, Boey returned with his fourth volume of poetry in 2006. After the Fire deals primarily with the passing of his father in 2000. Boey's works have also appeared in anthologies like From Boys to Men: A Literary Anthology of National Service in Singapore, Rhythms: A Singaporean Millennial Anthology of Poetry and No Other City: The Ethos Anthology of Urban Poetry. In 2009, Boey released a book of travel essays and autobiographical reminisces, Between Stations, and in 2012, Boey returned with a fifth volume of poetry, Clear Brightness, which was selected by The Straits Times as one of the best books of 2012. Boey returned to Singapore in 2013 as one of the Nanyang Technological University's writers-in-residence. In 2014, he co-edited the anthology Contemporary Asian Australian Poets.

His own sense of restlessness about his life in Singapore is reflected prevalently in his poems. According to him, Singapore's rapid growth and his swift economic success were achieved at a cost. His feelings of displacement and disconnection with the past occurred precisely because places where one experienced his or her sense of belonging are now gone.

Boey's works are highly regarded by both the academic and writing communities in Singapore. Writer Shirley Lim remarked that he is the "best post-1965 English language poet in the Republic today". Angelia Poon argues that Boey's poems have "wrestled with the idea of travel as an inevitable part of poetic being and negotiated the multiple meanings of place as geographical location, private memory, personal association, and past fragment". Besides travel, family plays a large part in Boey's poems–in particular, the figures of his deceased father and grandmother. Boey says that his poems about them are "attempts to memorialize them, to deal with their disappearance. It’s like giving myself a second chance, for me to see them, and they to see me, in the light of what has passed. With forgiveness. And love. You are afraid to lose them, the images, the very sense of who they are." At the same time, Boey resists the label of 'autobiographical poet', describing himself as a "poet of experience".

Boey's poems are on the A-level syllabus for English literature in Singapore. His poem "The Planners" was included in the international O-level Literature in English and International General Certificate of Secondary Education syllabi from 2013 to 2015, and 2017 and 2018, while "Reservist" will be tested from 2017 to 2019. In addition, the New York University Sydney has Boey's Between Stations on its reading list.

In 2014, Boey served as one of the English Poetry judges for the Singapore Literature Prize. In October 2017, Boey's first novel, Gull Between Heaven and Earth, a fictionalised biography of Chinese poet Du Fu, was published by Epigram Books.

Boey's The Singer and Other Poems won the 2023 Kenneth Slessor Prize for Poetry.

== Works ==
Poetry

- Somewhere-Bound (Times Books International, 1989)
- Another Place (Times Books International, 1992)
- Days of No Name (EPB Publishers Pte. Ltd., 1996)
- After the Fire: New and Selected Poems (Firstfruits, 2006)
- Clear Brightness (Epigram Books and Puncher and Wattman, 2012)
- The Singer and Other Poems (Cordite Books, 2022)

Non-fiction

- Between Stations: Essays (Giramondo, 2009)

Fiction

- Gull Between Heaven and Earth: A Novel (Epigram Books, 2017)

Anthologies (as editor)

- Initio: An Anthology of Creative Writing from the University of Newcastle (Writers Club of University of Newcastle, 2004)
- Contemporary Asian Australian Poets (Puncher and Wattman, 2013)
- To Gather Your Leaving : Asian Diaspora Poetry from America, Australia, UK & Europe (Ethos Books, 2019)
