= Namiko Chan Takahashi =

Singaporean painter

Namiko Chan Takahashi 陈高桥洋子
- Born: 1974 (age 51–52); Singapore
- Education: Art Students League of New York, United States
- Known for: Oil painting
- Movement: Contemporary art
- Awards: 2006: Winner, UOB Painting of the Year Award. 1999: Winner, UOB Painting of the Year Award. 1998: Philip Morris ASEAN Art Awards.

Namiko Chan Takahashi (Chinese: 陈高桥洋子; Hawaiian: Alaka’i Kapuananiokekukui; born 1974) is a Singaporean contemporary artist. Specialising in realist portrait painting, Takahashi won the United Overseas Bank Painting of the Year Award in 2006 for the painting of a nude woman, Charisse. She is an elected member of the International Realism Guild.

== Early life and education ==
In 1974, Takahashi was born in Singapore to a Japanese mother and a Peranakan father. Takahashi studied at the National Junior College (1991–1992), enrolling in the Art Elective Programme.

Takahashi read law at the National University of Singapore Faculty of Law. Though she did well in her course of study, Takahashi did not have plans to become a lawyer, working with textiles and in theatre at the university. Takahashi went into jewellery-making and sold her pieces to fellow undergraduates.

After graduating in 1997, Takahashi started a pupillage at a local law firm, only to leave six months later. She continued to sell her own bridal jewellery designs and taught jewellery-making to save some money to further her studies at the Art Students League of New York. In 1999, she received an arts grant from the National Arts Council, which helped fund her education at the League.

In New York, Takahashi studied painting under US artists such as Harvey Dinnerstein, Ronnie Landfield, Daniel Greene and Mary Beth McKenzie at the League. Takahashi graduated from the League in May 2002 and returned to Singapore.

== Career ==
In November 2001, Takahashi showcased a series of expressionist oil paintings in her exhibition My Life as an Artist in Context with the Will of God at the Art Seasons Gallery. These paintings were created during her years with the Art Students’ League of New York. She had also donated her artwork titled Uma to the law faculty in honour of her teachers there. In turn, the faculty purchased the painting titled Untitled 4, in memory of two former faculty members who have died, Ricardo Almeida and Peter English.

On September 9, 2006, Takahashi won the UOB Painting of the Year competition with her painting Charisse.

With her husband, poet Aaron Lee, she co-founded the Christian contemporary a cappella group Agapella, a home-grown 14-member contemporary Christian ensemble made of young professionals.

A portrait of her friend and local singer Kit Chan was used as album cover illustration for Kit Chan's Dreamscape album.

Known as Alaka’i Kapuananiokekukui Namiko, she directs the Singapore branch of a Hawaiian Hula Dance school called Laniakea, together with her husband. She had trained in ballet, flamenco and Middle Eastern dance for many years. She teaches hula auana, hula hahiko, and hula ho'ano under the direction of Kumu Lei.

== Art ==
Charisse, a nude painting of a black woman representing "inner strength and determination of women of substance", was of Takahashi's friend and muse at the Art Students League of New York. Takahashi received the award from President of Singapore S R Nathan at the prize presentation ceremony held at the Esplanade.

== Major exhibitions ==
Dates	Title	Location
2001	My Life in Context with the Will of God	Art Seasons Gallery, Singapore
20 November - 18 December 2003	F R I E N D S / P H A S E S : Portraits and Nudes	The Art Gallery, National Institute of Education, Singapore
23–29 July 2007	Meeting	Jendela, Esplanade, Singapore
2 August - 2 September 2007	Parables	Art Seasons Gallery, Singapore
