= Ho Poh Fun =

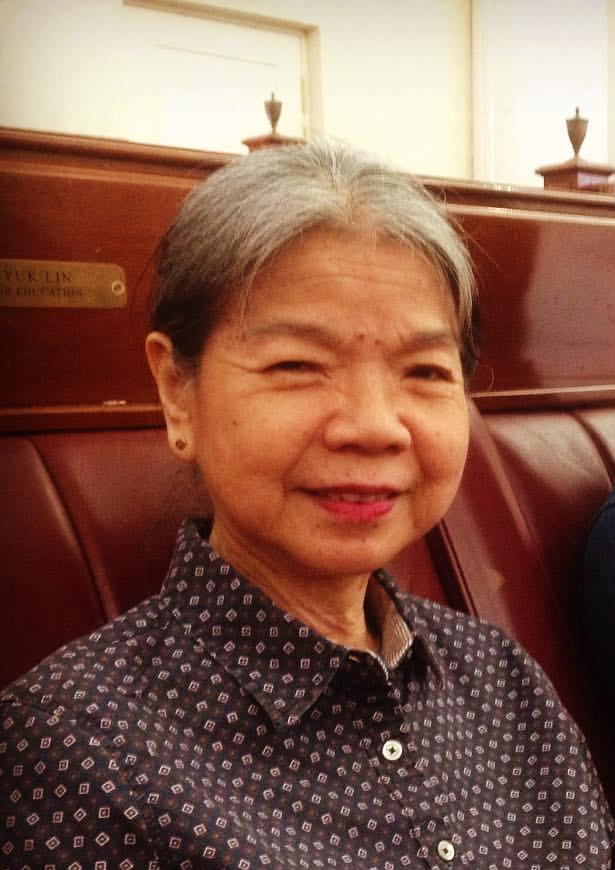
- Ho in 2016
- Born: 17 October 1946; Singapore
- Died: 12 March 2018 (aged 71)
- Education: National University of Singapore
- Writing career
- Language: English
- Genre: Poetry
- Notable works: Katong and Other Poems (1994)

Ho Poh Fun (17 October 1946 – 12 March 2018) was a Singaporean poet and writer. Her first and only poetry collection, Katong and Other Poems, won a Commendation Award at the 1996 National Book Development Council of Singapore's Book Awards. Ho taught for two decades at Raffles Junior College. She died in 2018, aged 71.

== Early life and education ==
Ho was born on 17 October 1946 in Singapore to a family of Hakka Chinese descent. She was the second of four children, two boys and two girls. Ho's father was a laboratory technician while her mother was a homemaker. As a child, Ho was briefly placed in foster care in Dhoby Ghaut, but later grew up around Katong and Marine Parade. She attended Haig Girls' School and Tanjong Katong Girls' School, before transferring to pre-university classes at Raffles Institution as part of its earliest batch of female students.

Aged 34, Ho enrolled as a mature student at the National University of Singapore (NUS), obtaining a bachelor's degree and a master's degree in English. While in university, Ho was the publications secretary of the NUS Literary Society and editor of its journal Focus. She was also part of a creative writing group that included Lee Tzu Pheng and Leong Liew Geok.

== Career ==
Immediately after taking the A-level examinations in 1965, Ho became a teacher, first at Katong Girls' School and later at Mount Vernon Secondary School. She also taught at Raffles Junior College for 20 years. When addressing her students, Ho tended to refer to herself in the third person as "Miss Ho".

In 1983, Ho's short story "When the Tabebuia Bloomed at Soo Chow Gardens" — told from the perspective of a sexagenarian stroke survivor — won second prize at an annual short story writing competition organised by the Ministry of Culture. Ho's poems were also regularly published in Singaporean daily newspaper The Straits Times in the late 1980s and early 1990s. Her first and only poetry collection, Katong and Other Poems, was published in 1994 and dedicated to her master's degree supervisor Arthur Yap. It won a Commendation Award in poetry at the 1996 National Book Development Council of Singapore's Book Awards.

After the release of Katong, Ho produced little new work and "vanished from the public eye as a writer" by the 2000s. However, she remained a strong supporter of creative writing in Singaporean literature, establishing the Creative Writing Club at Raffles Junior College as well as the Afternoon of Poetry and Music, its yearly gathering of aspiring writers from educational institutions countrywide. Alumni of the Creative Writing Club include poets such as Alfian Sa'at, Ng Yi-Sheng, and Joshua Ip. Ho remained involved in the Creative Arts Programme residential seminar organised by the Ministry of Education, mentoring poets such as Aaron Maniam.

Ho retired from teaching in 2008. She died on 12 March 2018, aged 71. A posthumous collection of her works, titled Waves Rising: Collected Works of Ho Poh Fun & Responses and edited by Singaporean literary researcher Ann Ang, was published six years later in 2024.

=== Analysis ===
According to Ann Ang, "there has been scarce critical attention to Ho's work", which "comprises a substantial body of modernist ecological writing that departs from Singapore's human-centered and utilitarian environmental policies of the same period." She adds that it "resists epistemic categories that give primacy to the human as citizen and subject of capitalist sociality." Likening Ho to fellow Singaporean poet Wong May, Ang argues that "their work is marginalized within the canon of Anglophone writing of Singapore, which, in its short trajectory, is dominated by the attempt to articulate national and social imaginaries, however dissonant or divergent in later years."

== Selected publications ==
=== Fiction ===
- Tanjong Rhu and Other Stories (1986)

=== Poetry ===
- Katong and Other Poems (1994)
