= Mohamed Latiff Mohamed =

Singaporean Malay poet and writer (1950–2022)

- Born: 20 March 1950; Singapore
- Died: 13 October 2022 (aged 72); Melbourne, Australia
- Occupations: Poet, writer
- Writing career
- Language: Malay

Mohamed Latiff Mohamed (20 March 1950 – 13 October 2022) was a Singaporean Malay poet and writer.

== Biography ==
Mohamed Latiff Mohamed was born in Singapore on 20 March 1950. He was educated at Guillemard Malay School, followed by Tun Seri Lanang Secondary School and Kaki Bukit Secondary School.

== Career ==
After his secondary education, Mohamed Latiff studied at the Teachers Training College and taught at several primary and secondary schools before moving to Curriculum Development Institute of Singapore (CDIS) to design course materials for the Malay-language secondary curriculum. He retired in 1999 to focus on writing full-time.

== Literary career ==
Mohamed Latiff first started writing at the age of 16, and his poem Kepincangan (“Handicaps”) was published in the school magazine. He also published his first short story Ani cintamu masih usang (“Ani, your love is still outdated”) in the entertainment magazine Bintang dan lagu.

Mohamed Latiff noted that "[o]ne should not simply write about 'beautiful' things, but should seek to correct the wrongs that one sees in society." His poems tackle the social issues facing the Malay community in Singapore and he strongly believes in the power of literature to combat against racial discrimination in Singapore. This has led to friend and fellow Malay writer S.N. Masuri calling Mohamed Latiff a "poet of protest" and "an angry young man." His poetry collection Segumpal api selingkar pelangi: puisi-puisi pilihan 1967–1977 (translated as A Crackle of Flames. A Circle of Rainbows: Selected Poems 1967-1977) features gruesome imagery such as blood and pus to convey the harsh realities of discrimination and mistreatment of the poor, especially the Malay community. In spite of his work attempting to highlight the oppression of the Malay community, he was also critical of the community's pace of progress in keeping up with globalisation.

Mohamed Latiff was also the author of nine novels and short story collections, including Batas Langit (1996) and Ziarah Cinta (1998) which have been translated into English as Confrontation (2013) and The Widower (2015) respectively. His novels depict the struggles of the Malay community in post-independence Singapore. His novel Dalam keasingan, which used symbolic characters and a style that was more akin to poetry, was adapted into a stage play by Teater Ekamatra in 1990. His short story collection Nostalgia yang hilang: cerpen-cerpen pilihan 1982–2002 (2004) was later translated into English by Nazry Bahrawi.

Mohamed Latiff was an active and longstanding member of Angkatan Sasterawan '50 (Asas '50) where he helped to develop Malay literature and culture, protect the rights of its members while introducing innovations in literature. He was awarded the Anugerah Munsyi Abdullah award for his contributions to creative writing.

Mohamed Latiff was a three-time Singapore Literature Prize winner, winning twice for poetry (2004 and 2008) and once for a short story collection (2006). He received the Cultural Medallion in 2013 for his contributions to Singaporean Malay literature.

== Personal life ==
Mohamed Latiff was married to Jamaliah Mohamed Noor. They had two sons. Mohamed Latiff died in Melbourne, Australia on 13 October 2022.

== Works ==
=== Poetry ===
- Segumpal api selingkar pelangi: Puisi-puisi pilihan 1967–1977 (Solo Enterprises, 1978)
- Pralina (Oblivion): Antologi puisi (puisi-puisi pilihan 1978–1983) (The International Cultural Study & Development Centre for Asia (Pusat Studi & Pengembangan Kebudayaan Asia), 1983)
- Danau sukma: Sajak-sajak pilihan 1983–1987 (Angkatan Sasterawan ’50, 1988) ISBN 9810002335
- Bagiku sepilah sudah: Kumpulan puisi-puisi pilihan 1990–2002 (Pustaka Nasional, 2002) ISBN 9971774631
- Bila rama-rama patah sayapnya: Puisi pilihan 2002–2006 (Angkatan Sasterawan '50, 2007) ISBN 9789810590789
- Bangsaku di hari lahirku (Angkatan Sasterawan '50, 2011) ISBN 9810886497
- A Crackle of Flames, A Circle of Rainbow: Selected Poems 1967–1977 (Tr. Zakaria Ali and Muhammad Herwanto Johari) (Ethos Books, 2017) ISBN 9789811151804

=== Fiction ===
- Kota air mata (Penerbitan Solo Enterprise, 1977)
- Di puncak rindu (Solo Enterprises, 1978)
- Sandyakala (The International Cultural Study & Development Centre for Asia, 1984)
- Dalam keasingan (Marwilis Publisher & Distributors, 1989) ISBN 9838310859
- Batas langit (Pustaka Cipta Sdn Bhd, 1996) ISBN 9679974944
- Ziarah cinta (Dewan Bahasa dan Pustaka, 1998) ISBN 9836259325
- Nostalgia yang hilang: cerpen-cerpen pilihan 1982–2002 (Pekan Ilmu Publication Sdn Bhd, 2004) ISBN 9832567297
- Ziarah rindu (Pustaka Nasional, 2004) ISBN 9971775018
- Confrontation (Tr. Shafiq Selamat) (Epigram, 2013)
- The Widower (Tr. Alfian Sa'at) (Epigram, 2015)
- Lost Nostalgia (Tr. Nazry Bahrawi) (Ethos Books, 2017) ISBN 9789811153013

== Awards ==
- 1998: Montblanc-NUS Centre for the Arts Literary Award.
- 1999: Malay Literary Award consolation prize for Batas langit (Malay Language Council of Singapore).
- 2002: Southeast Asian (SEA) Write award.
- 2003: Tun Seri Lanang Award (Malay Language Council of Singapore, Ministry of Information, Communications and the Arts).
- 2004: Singapore Literature Prize for Bagiku sepilah sudah (poetry collection).
- 2006: Singapore Literature Prize for Nostalgia yang hilang (short-story collection).
- 2008: Singapore Literature Prize for Bila rama-rama patah sayapnya (poetry collection).
- 2009: National Arts Council Special Recognition Award.
- 2013: Cultural Medallion
