= Different Strokes =

Different Strokes may refer to:

- Diff'rent Strokes, an American television series
- Different Strokes (film), a 1998 American film
- Different Strokes (album), a 1985 album by Alison Krauss
- Different Strokes, a 1972 album by the Nite-Liters
- "Different Strokes", a 1967 song by Syl Johnson
- Different Strokes, a 1993 novel by David Leo

== See also ==
- "Different strokes for different folks", a 1966 quotation by Muhammad Ali
- "Different strokes for different folks", a lyric from the 1968 song "Everyday People" by Sly and the Family Stone
  - Different Strokes by Different Folks, a 2005 album by Sly and the Family Stone
- Different Strokes for Different Folks, a 1972 album by Don Covay and the Jefferson Lemon Blues Band
