= Suratman Markasan =

Singaporean poet and novelist (1930–2024)

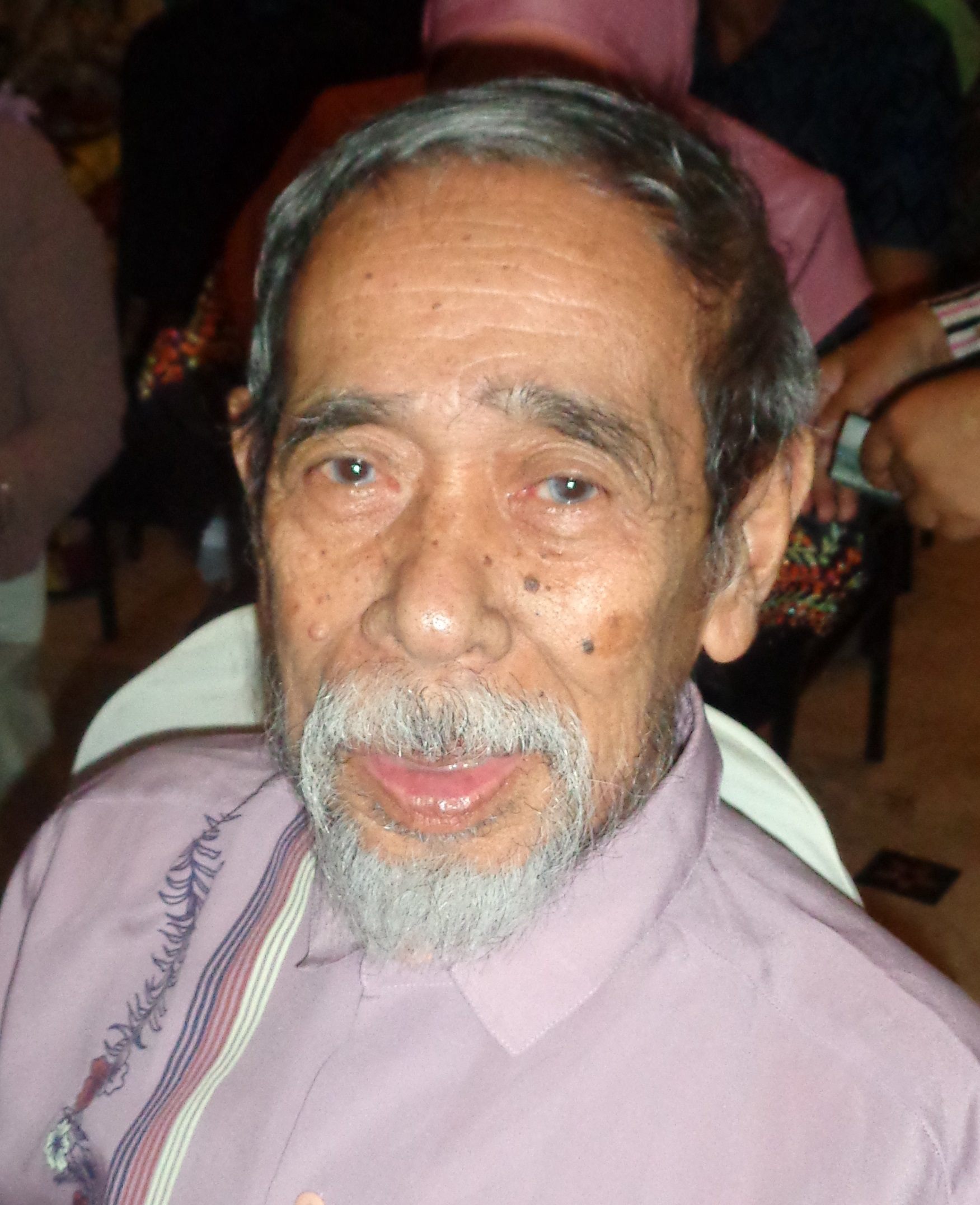
- Suratman Markasan in 2016
- Born: Suratman bin Markasan; 29 December 1930; Singapore, Straits Settlements, British Malaya
- Died: 27 February 2024 (aged 93); Singapore
- Occupations: Poet, novelist
- Known for: Literary pioneer
- Notable work: Mekar dan Segar (1959); Tak Ada Jalan Keluar (1962); Subuh Hilang Senja (1989); Dunia Bukan Kita Punya (2011)
- Awards: Cultural Medallion; Southeast Asian Writers Award; Mastera Literary Award; Singapore Literature Prize

Suratman bin Markasan (29 December 1930 – 27 February 2024) was a Singaporean poet, novelist and literary pioneer. He was awarded the Cultural Medallion, the S.E.A. Write Award, the Anugerah Sasterawan Mastera and the Singapore Literature Prize. He was also known by his pen names S. Markasan and Suman Mali.

== Biography ==
=== Early life and education ===
Suratman was born in Singapore on 29 December 1930 to Malay parents of Javanese descent. As a child, he attended Malay schools in the 1940s. After graduating from secondary school, he was employed as a trainee teacher at Sekolah Melayu Pasir Panjang or known as the Pasir Panjang Malay School. He then attended Sultan Idris Training College in Perak, British Malaya (present-day Malaysia) and graduated from the school with a teaching certificate in 1950.

=== Early career and literary development ===
After graduating from the Sultan Idris Teachers' College (now known as the Sultan Idris Education University) in Tanjung Malim, Perak, Malaysia, Suratman returned to Singapore and began his career as a teacher at the Sekolah Melayu Teluk Blangah. During this time, he joined the Singapore Malay Teachers' Union and Angkatan Sasterawan '50. In 1954, he wrote his first poem, Hati yang Kosong, and in 1959, he published his first poetry collection, Mekar dan Segar. His debut novel, Tak Ada Jalan Keluar, was written in 1958 and published in 1962. From 1961 to 1968, he taught at Pasir Panjang Secondary School and later at Swiss Cottage Secondary School.

In 1968, Suratman enrolled in Nanyang University and graduated in 1971 with a Bachelor of Arts in Malay and Indonesian Studies. During this time, he served as the vice-president of the Singapore Malay Teachers' Union (1970–1976) and as the editor of Majalah Sasterawan (1971–1973), which was published by Angkatan Sasterawan '50. From 1976 to 1980, he worked as a Special Inspector of Schools and as a language and literature consultant at the Ministry of Education. His notable publications during this period included Antologi Mata Hari Kota (1979) and Persidangan Penulis ASEAN 1977 (1977).

=== Leadership and academic contributions ===
In 1980, Suratman was appointed Director for Malay and Tamil Studies at the Ministry of Education. From 1981 to 1985, he served as a full-time lecturer at the National Institute of Education, continuing part-time until 1995. He also chaired the Language and Literature Committee of Majlis Pusat Singapura (1981–1986) and held roles at MENDAKI as chairman of the Information and Publishing Department (1981–1987). His publications during this era included Gerak dan Dialog (1982), Gema Temasik (1983), and Bahasa dan Sastera Nusantara: Sejarah dan Masa Depannya (1984).

Between 1986 and 1988, Suratman served as the Pro tem President of the Malay Language Teachers Association and deputy president of Majlis Pusat Singapura and Angkatan Sasterawan '50. Notable publications included Jalan Permulaan (1986), Tiga Warna Bertemu (1987), and Temasik (1987).

In 1989, he received the prestigious S.E.A. Write Award and published his second novel, Subuh Hilang Senja.

=== Later career and recognition ===
Significant achievements marked Suratman’s later career. He published Tiga Lelaki (1995), Di Bumi Mana (1994), and Penghulu yang Hilang Segala-galanya (1998). Awards included the Montblanc-NUS Centre for the Arts Award (1997) and the Tun Sri Lanang Literary Award (1999). His works from this period, such as Stories From Southeast Asia (1997) and Kembali Kepada Al-Quran (2000), cemented his legacy as a writer and editor.

In 2010, Suratman was awarded the Cultural Medallion and published Puisi-puisi Perjalanan. His later works included Dunia Bukan Kita Punya (2011) and Puisi Luka dan Puisi Duka (2004). In 2022, he and historian Wang Gungwu became the oldest recipients of the Singapore Literature Prize, further solidifying his place in Singapore’s literary history.

== Personal life and death ==
Suratman Markasan was married. His wife died in 1981. He died on 27 February 2024, at the age of 93.
