= Death of a Perm Sec =

2016 novel by Wong Souk Yee

- First edition
- Author: Wong Souk Yee
- Language: English
- Genre: Political Thriller, Mystery
- Published: 2016 (Epigram Books)
- Publisher: Epigram Books
- Publication date: April 2016
- Publication place: Singapore
- Media type: Book
- ISBN: 978-981-49-0140-6

Death of a Perm Sec is a 2016 novel written by Singaporean playwright, former political detainee, and former chairman of the Singapore Democratic Party Dr Wong Souk Yee. The book depicts the mystery and fallout surrounding the demise of the Permanent Secretary of the housing ministry, Chow Sze Teck, after he was accused of accepting millions of dollars in bribes over his career. The novel explores the dark heart of power politics, from the country’s tumultuous post-independence days to the socio-political landscape of the 1980s. Death of a Perm Sec was one of four finalists for the inaugural Epigram Books Fiction Prize in 2015, and was subsequently shortlisted for the Singapore Literature Prize in 2018.

== Plot summary ==
Set in 1980's Singapore, the novel examines the death of Permanent Secretary of the housing ministry, Chow Sze Teck, who was accused of accepting millions of dollars in bribes over his career. While the death first appears to be suicide by a cocktail of alcohol, morphine and Valium; doubts emerge as new facts come to life. With an ongoing investigation by a Criminal Investigation Department inspector who might not be what he seems, the family discovers there may be far more sinister circumstances behind Chow's death, that reach to the very top of government.

== Development ==
=== Origins ===
Death of a Perm Sec was written while Wong was pursuing a PhD in creative writing and literature at the University of New South Wales, as part of her doctoral studies. The novel was initially entitled Expelled, before taking on its current title. Upon the novel's completion in 2004, Wong submitted the manuscript to a local publisher but was rejected. Sharing on her decision to submit the novel for publication in 2015, Wong said:

"I didn't try again until Epigram offered the $20,000 prize. Then I thought, what the heck, since I already wrote it, I'll just give it a shot. I have nothing to lose,"

=== Historical Inspirations ===
In interviews, Wong has shared that writing Death of a Perm Sec tapped on her interest to rediscover Singapore's post-independence history, as well as the death of former Minister for National Development Teh Cheang Wan in 1986. The novel, Wong said, "[is] set in the 1980s, but there are flashbacks to the 1960s, when Singapore was rolling toward independence." This historical period, Wong commented, was not widely covered in local literature "till the last few years, there have been more books, fiction and nonfiction, that touch on the history of our independence - who were the real heroes, who were the unsung heroes." Wong has cited historical events such as Singapore's merger with Malaysia and Operation Coldstore as events she sought to depict in the novel. Of the motivation to write Death of a Perm Sec, Wong said:

"I want[ed] to find out more about my own country's history and write about our political history and the what-ifs and what-could-have- beens, while also looking at how political developments can have personal consequences."

== Reception ==
Death of a Perm Sec was shortlisted for several awards upon its release, including:

- Shortlisted for the inaugural Epigram Books Fiction Prize, 2015
- Shortlisted for the Popular Readers' Choice Awards - English (Adult) Books Category, 2016
- Shortlisted for the Singapore Literature Prize, 2018

Death of a Perm Sec has received praise from individuals such as Singaporean poet and playwright Alfian Sa'at, former president of the Law Society of Singapore Philip Jeyaretnam, and former Amnesty International Prisoner of conscience, Chew Kheng Chuan. Singaporean playwright and senior research fellow at the Institute of Policy Studies Tan Tarn How cited Death of a Perm Sec as his favourite book of 2017.
