= The Lover's Inventory =

Poetry collection by Cyril Wong

- First edition
- Author: Cyril Wong
- Language: English
- Publisher: Math Paper Press
- Publication date: 2015 and 2018
- Publication place: Singapore
- Pages: 60
- ISBN: 978-981-09-4560-2

The Lover's Inventory is a poetry collection by the Singaporean poet Cyril Wong inventorying objects, places, sensations, and other memorabilia that serve as springboards for memory and philosophical insight; its Confessional verse "confesses without dreary interrogation...in which masks slip on and off in pure, poetic theatre", while the poetry's openness has been transformed into "a defiant act against cultural hypocrisy." The book is "a self-portrait built out of an inventory of intimacies", offering "a critical and tender exploration of how love and sex both help and prevent us from fully understanding ourselves and each other." The book received the Singapore Literature Prize for English poetry in 2016.

== See also ==
- Singapore gay literature
- Cyril Wong
