= Madeleine Lee (writer) =

Investment manager and poet in Singapore

Madeleine Lee is an investment manager and poet in Singapore.

== Early life and education ==
Lee was educated at Raffles Girls School and subsequently at Hwa Chong Junior College.

Lee has written poetry since she was 13. She was mentored by novelist Suchen Christine Lim. Lee's writing was said to be greatly influenced by her maternal grandmother, who single-handedly ran the family's bumboat business and brought up her six children.

Lee eventually graduated in the United Kingdom with a Bachelor of Arts in Economics (Hons) and Accounting, and a Master of Business Administration in Finance. She is a Chartered Financial Analyst. In 2002, Lee received a prestigious Eisenhower Fellowship.

== Career ==
Lee has sat on the boards of public and private companies in Singapore. She was the treasurer of the United Nations Development Fund for Women Singapore, and the president of the Raffles Girls School Alumni. She has been active in the Yong Siew Toh Music Conservatory of the National University of Singapore, the Singapore Symphony Orchestra and the International Women's Forum. She was also the deputy chief investment officer of the Investment Office of the National University of Singapore.

As a writer, she has performed internationally at major literary festivals, including the Indonesia International Poetry Festival 2008, the Ubud Writers Festival 2009, the Melbourne Writers Festival 2010, and the Hanoi Poetry Festival 2013. She has also been consistently featured in the Singapore Writers Festival since 2003. Her collections have also been variously adapted, with y grec and one point six one eight being adapted for the stage by Cake Theatrical Productions in 2007 and 2013. In 2015, she was selected to represent Singapore writers in the Writing the City series of short films and interviews.

Lee's work has also been adapted into other forms. The poem blue was interpreted into visual art, while the poem negative light was interpreted in dance by the Montreal Dance Troupe in 2004. Other poems like coffee, caesura, and ultraviolet were also adapted into film by Arts Central (2005), the Paris Poetry Festival (2012) and by Writing the City (British Council, 2015) respectively. In 2005 she co-produced the play 2nd Link with W!LDRICE and in 2011 produced Moving Worlds, an anthology featuring Singapore poetry on the MRT.

Lee also collaborated with two other Singaporean writers in 2003 for the creation of the National Online Repository of the Arts (NORA) within the National Library Board. The project sought to build and develop an online platform to showcase digitised literary works by prominent Singapore artists which were previously unpublished, out-of-print or inaccessible to the masses. NORA was launched in early 2009.

== Works ==
Poetry
Year	Title	Notes
2003	A Single Headlamp	This was Lee's first collection of published poetry.
2004	fiftythree/zerothree	One of the poems in this collection, "Coffee", was adapted into a short film and broadcast in the programme A Thousand Words on the then Arts Central channel of Mediacorp, Singapore.
2005	y grec	Co-written by playwright Eleanor Wong, the book was inspired by a 10-day vacation they took together in Greece in 2004. The book was subsequently adapted into a theatre piece by Cake Theatrical Productions and performed at The Arts House in December 2007 as part of the 2007 Singapore Writers Festival.
2008	synaesthesia	The poem 'blue' in this collection was also interpreted into visual art/paint.
2013	pantone125	This book is a two-poem anthology centered around the preservation of Singaporean landmarks such as the Bukit Timah railway tracks and Bukit Brown Cemetery.
2013	one point six one eight	This book was also adapted into a theatre piece by Cake Theatrical Productions in 2013. One of the poems, 'ultraviolet', was also adapted into film by Writing the City in 2015.
2015	flinging the triplets	This volume of poetry comprises a collection of works arising primarily from Lee's stint in 2015 as Writer-in-Residence at the Singapore Botanic Gardens.
2017	square root of time	This volume of poetry was mathematical disciplines. Each section of the book after terms related to mathematics, for instance 'mean' and 'chance'.
2018	regarding	This volume of poetry was written in response to the National Gallery Singapore's exhibition, as part of its Words on Art series. The series is dedicated to articulating the intersections between visual and literary art. Lee was the Gallery's first poet-in-residence 2017-18.
