= Yong Shu Hoong =

Poet and educator from Singapore

- Born: 1966 (age 59–60)
- Education: St. Gabriel's Primary School; Raffles Institution; Raffles Junior College; National University of Singapore; Texas A&M University
- Occupations: Poet, tutor at Nanyang Technological University

Yong Shu Hoong (born 1966) is a Singaporean poet and educator.

== Biography ==
Yong was born in Singapore in 1966. He grew up in a bilingual household and published his first story in a Chinese student literary magazine.

Yong studied Computer Science at the National University of Singapore (NUS) after his National Service, and worked as a programmer at the Development Bank of Singapore in 1990. It was at NUS that he began writing. He was a contributor to the campus newspaper, and would regularly publish tabloid articles.

Two years later, Yong left his job at DBS and enrolled in Texas A&M University to read for a Masters in Business Administration. Hee started writing poetry in the form of love songs, emulating New Wave bands he looked up to like Duran Duran and Spandau Ballet. Later, he joined the literary magazine Inkshed Press.

Yong is a part-time tutor at Nanyang Technological University, and is a regular contributor to newspapers like The Straits Times and My Paper.

== Literary activities ==
In 1994, Yong submitted a manuscript of forty to fifty poems to the Singapore Literature Prize and was shortlisted. It was through this that he met Enoch Ng, who would prove instrumental in his literary career. Ng's eventual founding of Firstfruits Publications gave Yong a platform on which to present his work, and his shrewdness of editing provided Yong with a literary rigor he had not been exposed to previously. Enoch would go on to publish four of Yong's poetry collections under the publishing house Firstfruits Publications.

Yong's work has also appeared in journals like the Quarterly Literary Review Singapore, Asia Literary Review, and anthologies like Language for a New Century (2008) and Balik Kampung (2012).

Apart from writing, Yong has also contributed to the growth of the literary scene in various ways. In 2001, Yong founded subTEXT, a forum for readings by authors. He also managed the Mentor Access Project through Mediaexodus Limited Liability Partnership, which provided aspiring writers exposure to the Singaporean literary scene, and gave them access to guidance from older writers.

== Works ==
Poetry
Title	Year	Publisher	ISBN	Notes
Isaac: Poems	1997	Firstfruits Publications	ISBN 978-981-00-9473-7	
Isaac: Revisited	2001	Ethos Books	ISBN 9810437048	
Dowhile	2002	Firstfruits Publications	ISBN 9810468628	
Frottage	2005	Firstfruits Publications	ISBN 9810528892	Singapore Literature Prize for English Poetry (2006)
From Within the Marrow	2010	Firstfruits Publications	ISBN 978-981-08-6033-2	
The Viewing Party	2013	Ethos Books	ISBN 978-981-11-0974-4	Singapore Literature Prize for Poetry (2014)
Lost Bodies: Poems Between Portugal and Home	2016	Ethos Books	ISBN 978-981-11-0974-4	with Phan Ming Yen, Heng Siok Tian and Yeow Kai Chai
Right of the Soil	2018	Ethos Books	ISBN 978-981-09-6092-6	

Prose
Title	Year	Publisher	ISBN	Notes
The Adopted: Stories from Angkor	2015	Ethos Books	ISBN 978-981-09-4458-2	with Phan Ming Yen, Heng Siok Tian and Yeow Kai Chai

Edited Anthologies
Title	Year	Publisher	ISBN	Notes
Passages: Stories of Unspoken Journeys	2013	Ethos Books	ISBN 978-981-07-7695-4	
Here Now There After	2018	Marshall Cavendish	ISBN 978-981-47-7903-6	
