= Let Me Tell You Something About That Night =

2009 short-story collection by Cyril Wong

- Author: Cyril Wong
- Language: English
- Publisher: Transit Lounge and Ethos Books
- Publication date: 2009 and 2012
- Publication place: Singapore
- Pages: 140
- ISBN: 978-0-9805717-1-4

Let Me Tell You Something About That Night is a short-story collection by the Singaporean poet Cyril Wong. His first published foray into prose and listed by The Straits Times as among the best five books of the year, described by the reviewer as possessing "the sharp bite of contemporary issues", the book "takes fairytales and works them into a surreal lustre" and "gestures to a time before fairytales were saccharine fantasies", while a few stories also deal openly with sexuality: "The Boy with the Flower That Grew out of His Ass is a fable of wounding poignancy about homophobia; The Queen & Her Eventual Knowledge of Love is a post-mortem coming-out story."

== See also ==
- Singapore gay literature
- Cyril Wong
