= Phillip Y. Kim =

American novelist

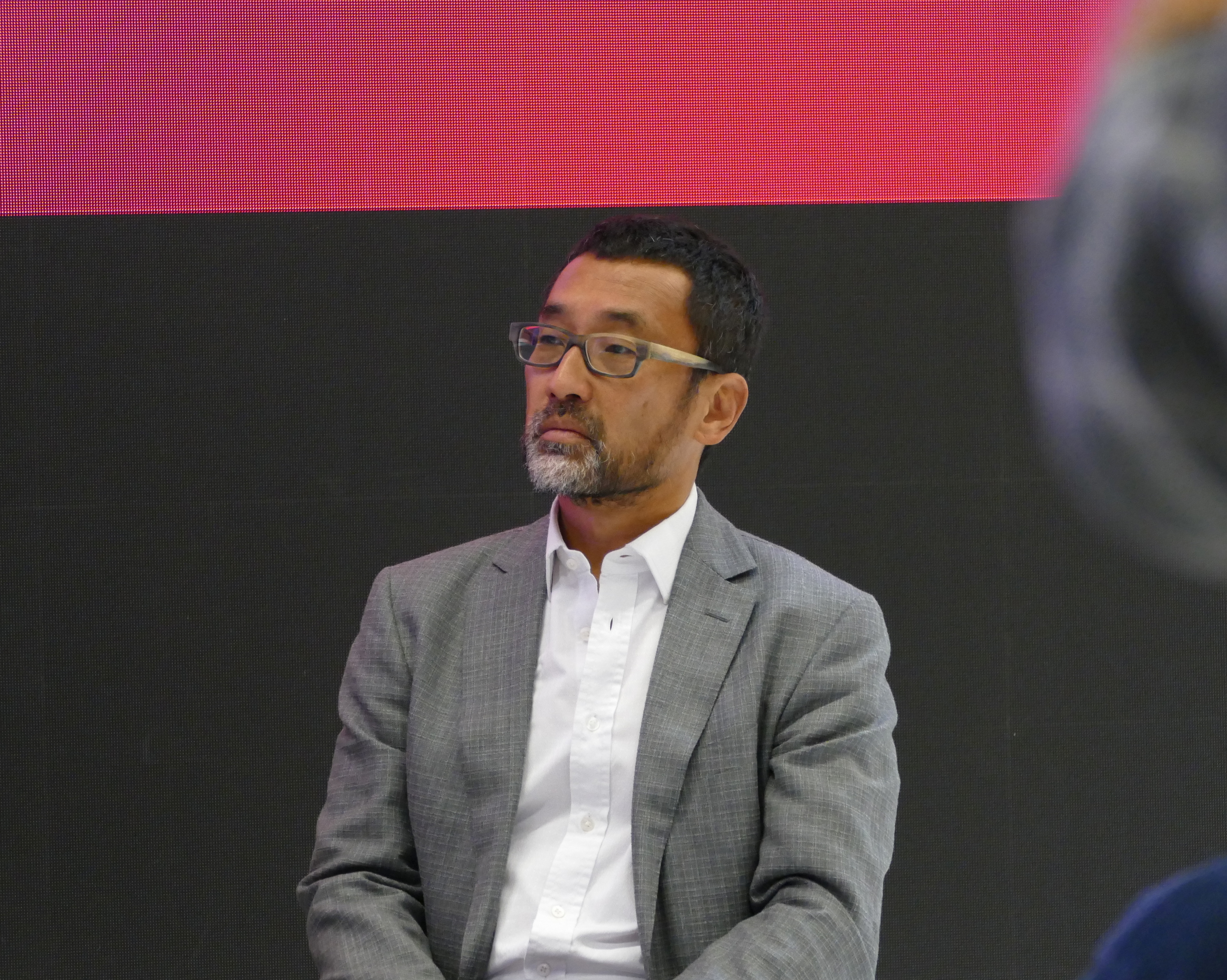
- Born: 1961 (age 64–65); Seoul, South Korea
- Education: University of California at Berkeley
- Occupations: writer and editor

Phillip Y. Kim (born 1961) is a South Korean-born American writer and editor in London. His first novel, an Asian financial thriller titled Nothing Gained, was published by Penguin Books in Australia and Asia in 2013. Since 2015, Kim has been co-owner and Managing Editor of the Asia Literary Review. In 2020, he acted as Project Manager and Senior Editor for an autobiography by dancer, actor and artist Sergei Polunin, FREE: A Life in Images and Words, published by teNeues Media.

== Biography ==
Phillip Y. Kim was born in Seoul, South Korea. He immigrated with his family to the United States at the age of one, first to Berkeley, California, and then to Washington, D.C.

Kim graduated from the University of California at Berkeley in 1985 and pursued a career in investment banking. He joined Lehman Brothers that same year. In 1992 Kim moved to Hong Kong with the company. He left Lehman Brothers in 1998 and went on to work at Morgan Stanley before shifting his focus to boutique investment banks. He moved to London in 2015, where he has focused on several writing and editing projects.

== Writing life ==
Kim's writing initially drew largely on his experiences of working in finance and living in Asia. He initially self-published his first novel, Nothing Gained, under a different title before it was acquired by Penguin Books (China). He has also written several short stories some of which have been published in anthologies in Hong Kong.

Since moving to the UK in 2015, he has been active in promoting contemporary Asian literature through his involvement with the Asia Literary Review and serving on an advisory board with Asia House in London. He has acted as moderator and speaker at numerous literary events focused on Asian authors, including book launches and participation on literary panels at forums such as the London Book Fair and the Gothenburg Book Fair in Sweden.

In 2017, he cooperated with the British Council on the publicity and London launch event related to an anthology of fiction from Myanmar entitled Hidden Words, Hidden Worlds.

In 2018, he and South Korean author Krys Lee co-edited a special issue of the Wasafiri magazine spotlighting contemporary Korean literature.

In 2020, he diversified into ghostwriting and book project management for a coffee-table visual autobiography for ballet dancer Sergei Polunin, published in 2021 by teNeues Media.

He is in the process of completing a prequel to his first novel, Nothing Gained.

== Works ==
- Nothing Gained (Australia and Asia: Penguin Books/Viking, 2013)
- FREE: A Life in Images and Words by Sergei Polunin, project managed and edited by Phillip Kim (teNeues Media, 2021)
