= David Leo =

Singaporean writer

David Leo is a writer in Singapore. Leo received a Publishers Prize for Ah … The Fragrance of Durians & Other Stories in 1993, a (Singapore) National Book Department Council Book Awards for works in English in 1994 for The Sins of the Father, and Singapore Literature Prize commendation in 1995 for Wives, Lovers and Other Women.

He is also the author of Different Strokes, a novel published in 1993 on two AIDS victims and a reporter who interviews them. The novel explores societal views on AIDS and its victims.

Some of David's short stories have won prizes in writing competitions in Singapore. He also writes poetry; some of his poems have appeared in various publications including Singa, Focus, Breakthrough, Project Alpha Silver, and an anthology of 20th Century Poets published in the UK

Leo works as an Assistant General Manager at the Singapore Airport Terminal Services.

== Works ==
=== Different Strokes ===
Different Strokes is a novel written by David Leo and published in 1993. Through a character of a reporter named Keith, the novel explores the life of two AIDS victims, and describes their suffering and the dilemmas they face in the course of their illness. The work is among the earliest work in Singapore related to the gay community.

=== Novels, short stories and non-fiction ===
- Somewhere a Tiny Voice (1993)
- Ah ... the Fragrance of Durians' (1993)
- The Sins of the Father and Other Stories (1993)
- Different Strokes (1993)
- Wives, Lovers & Other Women (1995)
- Kiasu, Kiasi, You Think What (1995) ISBN 981-204-626-7 (see Kiasu)
- One Journey, Many Rivers (1997)
- Shakespeare Can Wait (2001)
- News at Nine (2003)
- Life's So Like Dat (2005)
- iDENTiTY (2008)
- Ubin Dreaming (You've Been Dreaming) (2012)
- Cherry Days (2015)

=== Anthologies ===
- No Other City – The Ethos Anthology of Urban Poetry
- Love Gathers All – The Philippines-Singapore Anthology of Love Poetry
- Rhythms – A Singapore Anthology of Millenium Poetry
- Man/Born/Free: Writings on the Human Spirit from Singapore (edited by Gwee Li Sui)
- OnE, The Anthology – Short Stories from Singapore's best authors (edited by Robert Yeo)
- Sound of Mind – A teacher-writers anthology of poems and prompts
- Influence and Confluence: East and West / A Global Anthology on the Short Story (edited by Maurice A Lee), East
- China Normal University Press (Story was also translated into Chinese) ISBN 978-7-5675-5183-1
- 20th Century Poets

== See also ==
- Singapore gay literature
- Gay literature
