= S Uthuman Ghani =

Singaporean television host

- Born: 1957
- Died: 2 January 2005 (aged 47–48)
- Citizenship: Singaporean
- Occupations: Television host, author, poet, humanitarian, philanthropist and lawyer

S Uthuman Ghani (1957 – 2 January 2005) was a Singaporean television host, author, poet, humanitarian, philanthropist, and lawyer. He was recognized for his contributions to Tamil-language television. In addition to his media career, Ghani was known for his humanitarian efforts and legal work.

In relation to the controversy surrounding his marriage, which was debated on religious and cultural grounds, Ghani expressed that individual quality of life is often influenced by the societal context in which one lives. He noted that society establishes laws and norms that individuals must navigate, and those who challenge these norms may face social criticism. He also referenced historical examples of individuals who went against entrenched societal values.
