= Eleanor Wong (playwright) =

Singapore playwright (born 1962)

Professor Eleanor Wong Siew Yin
- 王少研
- Born: 6 February 1962 (age 64)
- Education: National University of Singapore Faculty of Law (LLB); New York University School of Law (LLM)
- Occupations: Playwright, poet, legal academic
- Employer: National University of Singapore Faculty of Law

Eleanor Wong
- Simplified Chinese: 王少研
Transcriptions
Standard Mandarin
- Hanyu Pinyin: Wáng Shǎo Yán

Eleanor Wong Siew Yin (born 6 February 1962) is a Singaporean playwright, poet, lawyer and legal academic. She is an associate professor of law at the National University of Singapore, where she is vice dean of student affairs and director of the legal skills programme. She is also a member of the Remaking Singapore Committee.

== Early life and career ==
A graduate of the National University of Singapore (NUS) Faculty of Law as a Public Service Commission merit scholar, Wong won the Best Oralist (Championship Round) at the 1985 Philip C. Jessup International Law Moot Court Competition, where she was a member of the victorious NUS moot team. Wong started her career with the Commercial Affairs Department, prosecuting complex commercial and securities frauds. She obtained a Master of Laws in corporate law from New York University in 1990 and practised in the New York office of Coudert Brothers before returning to Singapore in 1992.

Wong also provided communications consultancy and held several top management portfolios within the television production arena. She has anchored a television current affairs show After Hours, and used to host a radio programme, Sex, Rights & Videotape. Wong has worked as a prosecutor and an international finance lawyer. Wong also serves as a mentor on the playwright development platform Watch This Space, spearheaded by director-playwright Chong Tze Chien, where she first mentored teacher and playwright Lucas Ho. Wong joined NUS in 2002 as director of the legal skills programme.

== Plays ==
Wong's plays have been produced in Singapore and regionally. She is best known for Invitation to Treat (2003), her trilogy of plays centred on the experiences of the character Ellen Toh, a lesbian lawyer in Singapore. This comprised the plays Mergers and Accusations, Wills and Secession and Jointly and Severably. Mergers and Accusations won the National Book Development Council of Singapore Award (Drama) in 1996. In 2005, Firstfruits Publications published the trilogy in book form. Wong made her theatrical debut with her first play, Peter's Passionate Pursuit, which clinched a joint first prize at the NUS-Shell Short Play Competition in 1986. Wong is currently one of two writers-in-residence at the Centre for Quantum Technologies (CQT) at NUS.

== Poems ==
Wong has also written poems: she contributed 12 to y grec (2005), a collection co-authored with Madeleine Lee and recently published Life – Science (2010), 22 poems accompanied by Chinese translations by Enoch Ng and Caleb Kiu. In 2015, Wills & Secession was selected by The Business Times as one of the "finest plays in 50 years" alongside productions by Goh Poh Seng, Michael Chiang and Alfian Sa'at and others.

== List of works ==
- Two’s Company or Peter's Passionate Pursuit (1986)
- To Touch the Soul of a God (1988)
- Jackson on a Jaunt, or, Mistaken Identities (1989)
- Exit (1990)
- The Joust (1991)
- Mergers and Accusations (1993)
- Block Sale (1996)
- Wills and Secession (1995)
- Jointly and Severably (2003)
- The Campaign to Confer the Public Star on JBJ (2006, revised 2007)
