= Peculiar Chris =

1992 novel by Johann S. Lee

- First edition
- Author: Johann S. Lee
- Language: English
- Genre: Novel
- Publisher: Cannon International
- Publication date: 1992
- Publication place: Singapore
- Media type: Print (Paperback)
- ISBN: 981-00-3557-8
- OCLC: 29415955
- LC Class: MLCS 92/05580 (P)

Peculiar Chris is a novel which deals with gay themes by Johann S. Lee, published in Singapore by Cannon International in 1992.

Lee wrote the book, his first novel, while doing his National Service in Singapore at the age of 19. It was published a year later. The book recounts the coming of age, and coming out, of Chris through his experience with the deaths of his father and his lover Samuel, the latter from AIDS. Chris meets his first lover, Kenneth, in Singapore, where Kenneth has traveled from Indonesia to study; he meets his second lover, Jack, in Sydney after he travels to Australia to come out, and leaves for London, the birthplace of Maurice, after Samuel's death. It is also noteworthy for documenting how the military bureaucracy reacts when a soldier comes out in Singapore.

The book was translated into Italian in 1997, under the shortened title of 'Chris'.

It was reprinted in 2008.

== Adaption ==
Singaporean playwright Alfian Sa'at adapted the novel into the play Happy Endings: Asian Boys Vol. 3. It was staged by W!LD RICE, a Singapore theatre company, from 11 to 29 July 2007.
