= Firstfruits publications =

Independent book publisher based in Singapore

firstfruits publications is an independent book publisher based in Singapore. It is an imprint of mediaexodus LLP, a design firm which offers copy-editing and translation services. firstfruits publications is known to publish a diverse range of writers from Singapore. It has published numerous poetry volumes and anthologies by writers including Aaron Maniam, Cyril Wong, Eleanor Wong, Madeleine Lee, Ng Yi-Sheng, and Yong Shu Hoong.

== History ==
firstfruits publications was founded in 1997 by Singaporean poet and translator Enoch Ng. It was founded after poet Yong Shu Hoong, a former national service platoon-mate of Ng, approached mediaexodus LLP with a manuscript of poems for editorial work. Ng started firstfruits publications to publish the manuscript, Yong's debut Anglophone poetry collection titled ‘Isaac’. This launch marked the genesis of firstfruits as an independent publishing house and a key feature of Singapore's expanding literary scene.

The publishing house was named for a few reasons. First, Ng expressed that he chose to spell the name in lowercase as the uppercase appeared to be too heavy for him. This deconstructivist gesture echoes Ng's own literary aesthetic. Likewise, Ng stated that the name also referred to “a tradition in agricultural societies, where the first fruits of one's crop are presented as an offering to the god or king.” Ng believed that “firstfruits is a way of paying homage to other publishing houses and writers” who have shaped and developed the industry.

== Collaborations ==
In 2000, the National Arts Council approached firstfruits to act as a coordinator to run its Mentor Access Project (MAP). This program paired unpublished writers from all four official languages in Singapore with established writers for eighteen months. These writers included Cyril Wong, Chong Tze Chien and Isa Kamari. The MAP sought to promote the building of a multiracial, collective Singaporean cultural heritage which was ethnically specific yet inter-relational.

Beyond publishing, firstfruits has ventured into multimedia collaborations, such as curating an exhibition with Yeo Wei Wei, then head of the Literature Department at the School of the Arts in October 2009. Titled Wolfnotes, the exhibition commemorated the twelfth anniversary of the publishing house, featuring a number of artists and writers who were published with firstfruits. Each exhibit was inspired by a poem. As Yeo explains, this was also in part to remind the public that reading is an act of agency, thus stressing the significance of active reading through creative means.

== Notable publications ==
firstfruits has put out more than forty titles in English and Chinese by local Singaporean writers. These include poetry volumes such as Yong Shu Hoong's Frottage, which co-won the Singapore Literature Prize with Cyril Wong's Unmarked Treasure in 2006, Ng Yi-Sheng's last boy, which won the Singapore Literature Prize in 2008, Yeow Kai Chai's One To The Dark Tower Comes, which won the Singapore Literature Prize in 2022, as well as the playwright Eleanor Wong's trilogy Invitation to Treat.
