= Asia Literary Review =

Quarterly literary journal published in English

- Asia Literary Review
- Frequency: Quarterly
- Founded: 2000
- Final issue: 2019
- Country: Hong Kong, China
- Language: English language
- Website: asialiteraryreview.com

The Asia Literary Review was a quarterly literary journal published in English and distributed internationally. It included articles of fiction, non-fiction, poetry, and the photography genre. The journal first published in Hong Kong in 2000 as a small local literary journal called Dim Sum, founded by Nuri Vittachi. Later, Nuri became involved with British businessman and philanthropist Ilyas Khan, who provided encouragement and financial support for the first decade. Khan was a Hong Kong supporter of arts and together they created an international showcase for writers from the Asian region. The final issue was No. 36, Spring 2019.

The journal advocated Asian writers by providing a platform for their work to be read in English by international readers. The journal ceased publication suddenly and without any explanation in 2019 during the Hong Kong protests. After a year-long hiatus on its Twitter account, the Asia Literary Review posted an uncaptioned photo of the goddess of democracy on June 4, 2020, the 31st anniversary of its destruction in Tiananmen Square.

== Contributors/Interview subjects ==
The magazine published interviews with figures such as Aung San Suu Kyi, David Mitchell, Salman Rushdie and Kyung-sook Shin (2011 winner of the Man Asian Literary Prize). Other contributors included Margaret Atwood, Justin Hill, Liu Xiaobo, Su Tong, Arvind Krishna Mehrotra, Laurie Thompson, Seamus Heaney, Kim Young-ha, Ko Un, Zheng Danyi, Bei Dao, Shehan Karunatilaka and Xu Xi.

== Poetry Parnassus ==
At Poetry Parnassus, part of the London 2012 Cultural Olympiad, an Asia Literary Review Celebration Reading was held at the Southbank Centre. Participants included Marjorie Evasco, Jang Jin-sung, Kim Hyesoon, Alvin Pang, Laksmi Pamuntjak and Jennifer Wong.

The event was covered by the Philippine Star and other media including CBN News.

== Staff ==
Managing Editor: Phillip Kim (Listed on website as business and finance director)

Editor in Chief: Martin Alexander 2010-Present (Poetry editor 2000 - 2015)

Consulting Editors: Peter Koenig, Robert Hemley, Anurima Roy

Senior Editors: Justin Hill, Kavita Jindal, Miichael Vatikiotis, Zheng Danyi

=== Former staff ===
Editor: Chris Wood (2008? -?)

Literary Editor: Kelly Falconer (Nov 2011 - Dec 2012)

Managing Editor and co-founder: Duncan Jepson (2004 - 2011)

Contributors included Margaret Atwood, Justin Hill, Liu Xiaobo, Su Tong, Arvind Krishna Mehrotra, Laurie Thompson, Seamus Heaney, Kim Young-ha, Ko Un, Zheng Danyi, Bei Dao, Shehan Karunatilaka and Xu Xi.

== Poetry Parnassus ==
At Poetry Parnassus, part of the London 2012 Cultural Olympiad, an Asia Literary Review Celebration Reading was held at the Southbank Centre. Participants included Marjorie Evasco, Jang Jin-sung, Kim Hyesoon, Alvin Pang, Laksmi Pamuntjak and Jennifer Wong.

The event was covered by the Philippine Star and other media including CBN News.

== Staff ==
Managing Editor: Phillip Kim (Listed on website as business and finance director)

Editor in Chief: Martin Alexander 2010- (Poetry editor 2000 - 2015)

Consulting Editors: Peter Koenig, Robert Hemley, Anurima Roy

Senior Editors: Justin Hill, Kavita Jindal, Miichael Vatikiotis, Zheng Danyi

=== Former staff ===
Editor: Chris Wood (2008? -?)

Literary Editor: Kelly Falconer (Nov 2011 - Dec 2012)

Managing Editor and co-founder: Duncan Jepson (2004 - 2011)
