= Cyril Wong =

Singaporean poet and author

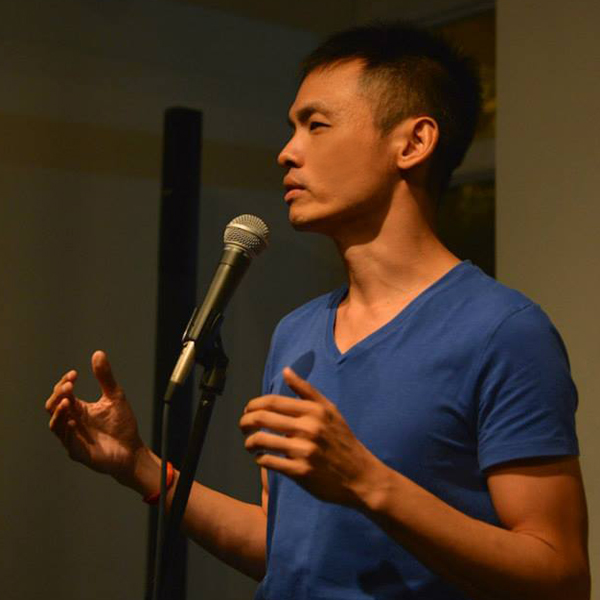
- Artistry Cafe (Singapore) on 19 September 2013.
- Born: 27 June 1977 (age 49); Singapore
- Education: National University of Singapore (PhD), Temasek Junior College, Saint Patrick's School, Singapore
- Occupation: Poet
- Writing career
- Notable awards: Golden Point Award (2004), National Arts Council's Young Artist Award (2005), Singapore Literature Prize (2006, 2016)

Cyril Wong (simplified Chinese: 黄益民; traditional Chinese: 黃益民; pinyin: Huáng Yì Mín; born 27 June 1977) is a poet, fiction author and literary critic.

== Biography ==
Born in 1977, Cyril Wong attended Saint Patrick's School, Singapore, and Temasek Junior College, before completing a doctoral degree in English literature at the National University of Singapore. His poems have appeared in journals and anthologies around the world, including the Atlanta Review, Fulcrum, Poetry International, Cimarron Review, Prairie Schooner, Poetry New Zealand, Mānoa, Ambit, Dimsum, Asia Literary Review, The Bungeishichoo (Japanese translation), the Norton Anthology Language for a New Century, and Chinese Erotic Poems by Everyman's Library. He has been a featured poet at the Edinburgh International Book Festival, the Hong Kong International Literary Festival, the Sydney Writers' Festival, and the Singapore Writers Festival. Time magazine has written that "his work expands beyond simple sexuality ... to embrace themes of love, alienation and human relationships of all kinds." The Straits Times has described the poet like this: "Cyril Wong is a graceful slip of a man, with a quiet air about him. He reads his poetry without drama, like he's just talking to you. But when he reads, the words sent tingles down my spine. His performance made one participant confess he 'peed in his pants'."

== Poetry ==
According to the International Examiner, "Cyril Wong mines the contradictions and frustrations of a broader existence with poems that shimmer with language, art, religion, disaster, death, murder, adultery and, of course, love." He has been recognised as Singapore's first truly confessional poet, mainly "on the basis of the brutally candid sexuality in his poetry, along with a barely submerged anxiety over the fragility of human connection and a relentless self-querying; but the label understates Wong's constant evolution". By turns "acerbic and tender, ironic and meditative", the poet "has many styles, all of them limber, which combine the anecdotal and the confessional with the intuitive and the empathetic." His poems are known for their "lyrical intensity" and for "training an almost anthropologically curious eye on the laws and customs of his own family: their strange taciturn ways, their gnomic references to disappointment and guilt, and their penchant for self-delusion." In a way that makes him distinctive within the Singaporean poetry scene, his work possesses "a heightened awareness of the physical body, and a desire to probe its visceral materiality for emotional truths." Ng Yi-Sheng describes that throughout the poet's career, "he has unashamedly presented himself in public as a gay man, winning himself a large LGBT fan base that identifies intimately with his writings on love, depression and antipathy towards his family." Edwin Thumboo has praised Wong's poems for their "remarkable inwardness" and how, "without exception, they leave us with the feeling of subjects – occasion, non-happening, an especially poignant experience – explored to unusual limits." His third collection, Below: Absence, and its play of presence and absence in the context of Singapore's urbanity and cultural memory, has been described by John Phillips as offering "an affirmation of emptiness in a time and place where this is barely possible."

Although Wong has also been popularly known as a gay poet, Singaporean critic Gwee Li Sui has stressed that readers need not perceive the poet's persona in terms of gay exceptionality: "his qualities of spaciousness and morphing images also manifesting an interest in a kind of New-Age irreligious spirituality." This interest is fully expressed in Wong's book, Satori Blues, in which the author "teases us out of our complacencies and directs/guides our thinking along the long, hard route to self-awareness ... Hence 'blues'. Hence the extraordinary attempt to seduce the reader into somnambulance-via-rhythmic, rhymic language, the language of meditative poetry." In closer connection to the poet's Confessionalism, Andrew Howdle writes of the poems in The Lover's Inventory as having "a sense of musical persona, a manner of singing, of intonation and expression, and are fully aware of how they confess through masks and make others reveal the masks that they wear." In a review by the Southeast Asian Review of English, Wong's work has been described as "an art that works simply from a personal plane, and from within such a plane we have some of the most sensitive, articulate probings into the nature of one's self that have never been seen before in all of contemporary Singaporean verse."

Gwee Li Sui has suggested that political and non-political verse are "paradoxically saying the same thing in Singapore", their forms "too often conflated in poetic argument with their creator's bodiliness"; and as regards the supposedly "non-political" and inward nature of Wong's verse, the poet has "landscapes that replicate so tightly his corporeal condition that his own poems become not just the means but also the ends of his self-transference. Wong regularly brings into his writing the empty space on each page in some performance of being more than words, embracing the word-space dichotomy as a version of a mind-body one ... His poetry ends up filling books in a way that destroys their form to give shape to heightened interiority." Tijan Sallah also writes: "Cyril Wong takes the ordinary and carries one on a meditative trance. There is a Buddhist mystique in his poetry, of the questioning self, trying to understand itself to free itself of desire, of the self in a Cartesian battle, which eventually ends in a state of awakened enlightenment, the state of rest."

Other poets who have responded to his work include Timothy Liu, who has called Wong's "transpacific sensibility a fine refreshment"; Lewis Warsh, with his description of Wong's poems as "evocative and sensual" and "untainted by bitterness"; Margot Schilpp, who has remarked that his work shows "how great the divide between expectations and outcomes can be"; and Robert Yeo, who has commented on the framing devices in his work that "deliberately blur distinctions between the real (Cyril Wong) and the persona (the poet who 'wonders at his own existence'). The result is a distancing that layers the poems and renders them more fraught and complex and encourages, indeed demands, repeated reading."

== Selected bibliography ==
=== Poetry collections ===
- The End of His Orbit (Firstfruits, 2001 | Math Paper Press, 2017)
- Below: Absence (Firstfruits, 2002 | Math Paper Press, 2017)
- Unmarked Treasure (Firstfruits, 2004 | Math Paper Press, 2012)
- Like a Seed With Its Singular Purpose (Firstfruits, 2006 | Math Paper Press, 2018)
- Excess Baggage and Claim, co-authored with Terry Jaensch (Transit Lounge, 2007)
- Tilting Our Plates to Catch the Light (Firstfruits, 2007 | Math Paper Press, 2012)
- Fires (Book Merah, 2009)
- Oneiros (Firstfruits, 2010 | Math Paper Press, 2018)
- Straw, Sticks, Brick (Math Paper Press, 2012)
- The Dictator's Eyebrow (Ethos Books, 2013)
- After You (Math Paper Press, 2013/2020)
- The Lover's Inventory (Math Paper Press, 2015/2018)
- Infinity Diary (Seagull Books, 2020)
- Beachlight (Seagull Books, 2023)

=== Short story collections ===
- Let Me Tell You Something About That Night (Transit Lounge, 2009 | Ethos Books, 2012)
- Ten Things My Father Never Taught Me and Other Stories (Epigram Books, 2014)

=== Novels ===
- The Last Lesson of Mrs De Souza (Epigram Books, 2013) | (Turkish translation: Alabanda Yayinlari, 2017)
- This Side of Heaven (Epigram Books, 2020)

=== Chapbooks ===
- The Boy With The Flower That Grew Out Of His Ass (Math Paper Press, 2007 and 2015)
- You Cannot Count Smoke (Math Paper Press, 2011)
- Satori Blues (Softblow Press, 2011 | Math Paper Press, 2020)
- Animal Season (Math Paper Press, 2020)
- My Grandmother's Body (Whittle Micro-Press, 2024)
- This Is How We Come Back (Rosetta Cultures, 2024)
- Flung (Rosetta Cultures, 2025)

=== Anthologies (as editor) ===
- Here and Beyond: 12 Stories (Ethos Books, 2014)
- Rainbow Voices: An Anthology of Creative Writings (The Arts House/Singapore Association for Mental Health, 2014)
- We Contain Multitudes: Twelve Years of SOFTBLOW (Epigram Books, 2016)
- The Epigram Books Collection of Best New Singaporean Short Stories: Volume Three (Epigram Books, 2017)

=== Transcreations ===
- Me Migrant (Poems by Md Mukul Hossine, tr. from Bengali, Ethos Books, 2016)
- Braving Life (Poems by Md Mukul Hossine, tr. from Bengali, HealthServe, 2017)

== Awards ==
- Best Literary Work finalist of Singapore Book Publishers Association's Singapore Book Awards for This Side of Heaven (2021)
- Like a Seed With Its Singular Purpose listed by The Straits Times as among the 50 greatest works of SingLit (2021)
- Best Valentine Poetry Film, Rabbit Heart Poetry Film Festival (2017)
- Singapore Literature Prize for The Lover's Inventory (2016)
- Finalist of Singapore Book Publishers Association's Singapore Book Awards for The Dictator's Eyebrow (2016)
- Let Me Tell You Something About That Night listed by The Straits Times as among the best 5 books of the year (2009)
- Tilting Our Plates to Catch the Light listed by The Straits Times as among the best 5 books of the year (2007)
- Singapore Literature Prize for Unmarked Treasure (2006)
