= Austin International Poetry Festival =

The Austin International Poetry Festival was an unjuried four-day poetry festival involving poetry readings, workshops, open mics, poetry slams, and haiku. Established in 1995, API published two Anthologies for the festival. These were di-vêrseʹ-city (Adult Anthology) and di-vêrseʹ-city Youth Anthology - which were also read by the poets during poetry readings at the festival.
