= Singapore Literature Prize =

Biennial award in Singapore

The Singapore Literature Prize (abbreviation: SLP) is a biennial award in Singapore to recognise outstanding published works by Singaporean authors in any of the four official languages: Chinese, English, Malay and Tamil. The competition is organised by the Singapore Book Council (SBC) with the support of the National Arts Council.

The award was briefly discontinued in 1999 and 2002 due to economic problems.

== 1992 Fiction ==
=== Winner ===
- Suchen Christine Lim - Fistful of Colours

=== Commendation ===
- Tan Mei Ching - Beyond the Village Gate

== 1993 ==
=== Poetry ===
==== Merit ====
- Desmond Sim - Places Where I've Been

==== Commendation ====
- Jeffery T.H. Lee - The Sea is Never Full
- Paul Tan - Curious Road

=== Drama ===
==== Merit ====
- Haresh Sharma - Still Building

==== Commendation ====
- Sim Teow Li - Curios

== 1994 Fiction ==
=== Merit ===
- Tan Mei Ching - Crossing Distance
- Stella Kon - Eston

=== Commendation ===
- David Leo - Wives, Lovers and Other Women
- Denyse Tessensohn - Feel
- Andrew Koh - Glass Cathedral

== 1995 Poetry ==
=== Winner ===
- Roger Vaughan Jenkins - From the Belly of the Carp

=== Merit ===
- Boey Kim Cheng - Days of No Name

=== Commendation ===
- Colin Cheong - Void Deck and Other Empty Places

== 1996 Fiction ==
=== Winner ===
- Colin Cheong - Tangerine

=== Commendation ===
- Dave Chua Hak Lien - Gone Case
- Pat Wong - Going Home & Other Stories

== 1997 Poetry ==
=== Merit ===
- Paul Tan - Driving into Rain

== 1998 Fiction ==
=== Merit ===
- Rosemary Lim - Soul Search & Other Stories (published as The Seed from the Tree)
- Colin Cheong - The Man in the Cupboard

=== Commendation ===
- Alfian bin Sa'at - Corridor and Other Stories
- Daren Shiau - Heartland

== Awards 2000 (as The Dymocks Singapore Literature Prize) ==
- Rex Shelley, A River of Roses

== Awards 2004 ==
=== English ===
- Winner: Tan Hwee Hwee – Mammon Inc
- Felix Cheong – Broken by the Rain
- Suchen Christine Lim – A Bit of Earth
- Alfian bin Sa’at – A History of Amnesia
- Claire Tham – The Gunpowder Trail & Other Stories

=== Chinese ===
- Winner: Yeng Pway Ngon (英培安) – 骚动
- Chia Hwee Pheng (希尼尔) – 轻信莫疑
- Guan Ming (关明) – 其实·底下的城市

=== Malay ===
- Winner: Mohamed Latiff Mohamed – Bagiku Sepilah Sudah
- Abdul Ghani Hamid – Ombak Terbang Tinggi
- A Wahab HJ Hamzah – Tuhan Masih Sayang
- Isa Kamari – Kiswah
- Masuri SN – Suasana Senja
- Rohani Din – Anugerah Buat Syamsiah

=== Tamil ===
- Winner: Ma Elankannan (M Balakrishnan) – Thondil Meen
- S Uthuman Ghani – Agrinai Uyarthinai
- K. T. M. Iqbal – Kaakitha Vaasam
- Krishnasamy Iyer Kanagalatha – Thee Velli
- Murugathasan – Thaembavai
- Subraa (Palanisamy Subramanian) – Uyirril Kalantha Urrave

== Awards 2006 ==
=== English ===
- Co-winner: Cyril Wong – Unmarked Treasure
- Co-winner: Yong Shu Hoong – Frottage
- Aaron Shahril Yusoff Maniam – Morning at Memory’s Border

=== Chinese ===
- Winner: Chia Joo Ming (谢裕民) – 重构南洋图像 Chong Gou Nan Yang Yu Xiang (Reconstructing Nanyang)
- Denon Lim Denan (林得楠) – 梦见诗
- Chia Hwee Pheng (希尼尔) – 希尼尔微型小说

=== Malay ===
- Winner: Mohamed Latiff Mohamed – Nostalgia Yang Hilang (The End Of Nostalgia)
- Anuar Othman – Kisah Di Bukit Cermin
- Suratman Markasan – Puisi Luka dan Puisi Duka
- Peter Augustine Goh – Warna sebuah Penghijrahan
- Johar Bin Buang – Cahaya di Negeri ini

=== Tamil ===
- Winner: Mohamed Iqbal – Vanavargal Mannil Irukkirarkal (Angels Are Here On Earth)
- K. Kanagalatha – Paampuk Kaattil oru Taazai
- Kavignareru Amallathasan – Pullanguzhal
- Murugathasan – Vadamalar

== Awards 2008 ==
=== English ===
- Winner: Ng Yi-Sheng – last boy
- Aaron Lee Soon Yong – Five Right Angles
- Wena Poon – Lions in Winter: Stories
- Elmo Jayawardena – Rainbows in Braille
- Suchen Christine Lim – The Lies that Build a Marriage

=== Chinese ===
- Co-winner: Chia Hwee Pheng (谢惠平) – 希尼尔小说选 (The Collection of Xi Ni Er Mini-Fiction)
- Co-winner: Yeng Pway Ngon (英培安) – 我与我自己的二三事 (Trivialities About Me and Myself)
- Chia Joo Ming (谢裕民) – 谢裕民小说选
- Liang Wern Fook (梁文福) – 左手的快乐
- Teoh Hee La aka Zhang Xi Na(张曦娜) – 张曦娜小说选
- Pan Cheng Lui (潘正镭) – 天微明时我是诗人

=== Malay ===
- Winner: Mohamed Latiff Mohamed – Bila Rama-rama Patah Sayapnya
- Muhammad Salihin bin Sulaiman Jeem – Anugerah Bulan Buat Bonda
- Suratman Markasan – Langau Menyerang Masjid Dan Cerita-Ceritanya
- Peter Augustine Goh – Cetusan Kalbu Seorang Penyair
- Johar Buang – Perahu Melayu Di Lautan Khulzum
- Manaf Hamzah – Sekeras Waja, Selembut Sutera

=== Tamil ===
- Winner: K. Kanagalatha – Naan Kolai Seyum Penkal (The Women I Murder)
- Jayanthi Sankar – Pin Seat (Back Seat)
- J.M. Sali – Aayul Thandanai
- Palanisamy Subramanian – Ouyir Ourugum Sabtham

== Awards 2010 ==
=== English ===
- Winner: Simon Tay – City of Small Blessings
- Toh Hsien Min – Means To An End
- Wena Poon – The Proper Care Of Foxes

=== Chinese ===
- Co-Winner: Gabriel Wu (吴耀宗) – 半存在 (A Half-Existence)
- Co-Winner: Chia Joo Ming (谢裕民) – M40
- Wang Wenxian (王文献) – 《爱城故事》
- Wong Meng Voon (黄孟文) –《黄孟文微型小说自选集》
- Ng Wai Choy (吴韦材) – 《爱的礼物》

=== Malay ===
- Winner: Johar Buang – Sampai di Singgahsana Cinta
- Abdul Manaf Abdul Kadir (Manaf Hamzah) – Dalam Kehangatan Dakapan Senja
- Azni Ismail (Jaka Budi) – Di Perhentian Ini… Hijrahkanlah Diri
- Noor Hasnah Adam – Kelarai
- Yazid Bin Hussein – Satu Macam Penyakit

=== Tamil ===
- Winner: Murugathasan – Sangamam
- Jayanthi Sankar – Migration
- Marimuthu Arumugam Elango (Pichinikkadu Elango) – Naanum Naanum
- Masilamani Anbalagan – Ayapulam

== Awards 2012 ==
=== English ===
- Winner: Eddie Tay – The Mental Life of Cities
- Leonard Ng – This Mortal World
- Dave Chua – The Beating & Other Stories
- Teng Qian Xi – They hear salt crystallising

=== Chinese ===
- Winner: Yeng Pway Ngon (英培安) – 画室 (Art Studio)
- Tan Chee Lay (陈志锐) – 《剑桥诗学》
- Neo Choon Hong (梁钺) – 《你的名字》
- Zou Lu (邹璐) – 《追随河流的方向》
- Lee Seng Chan (怀鹰) – 《舞魂》

=== Malay ===
- Merit: Ahmad Ja’affar Bin Munasip – Jago Yang Terlupa Dilupakan
- Commendation: Peter Augustine Goh Mey Teck – Kerana Setitik Madu
- Commendation: Rohman Munasip – Secangkir Ceritera
- Commendation: Yazid Hussein – Dongeng Utopia : Kisah Cek Yah

=== Tamil ===
- Winner: Ramanathan Vairavan – Kavithai Kuzhanthaikal
- Masilamani Anbalagan – En Vaanam Naan Megam
- Yousuf Rowther Rajid Ahmed – Vizhikkullethaan Vellayum Karuppum
- Marimuthu Arumugam Elango – Antha Naan Illai Naan

== Awards 2014 ==
For the first time, the award offered 12 top prizes of up to $10,000 each for the best works of fiction, non-fiction and poetry in Chinese, English, Malay and Tamil. In previous years, fiction competed with poetry for one award in each language.

In July 2014, three judges of the English non-fiction category of the prize resigned in protest against the National Library Board's removal and pulping of controversial children's titles. Mr T. Sasitharan, a prominent arts educator; former journalist Romen Bose; and American author and Writer-in-Residence at Yale-NUS College, Robin Hemley were subsequently replaced. The Prize also received flak for perhaps spreading itself too thin, and for naming the non-fiction prizes after a sponsor, the publisher World Scientific.

A day after the winners were announced at an awards ceremony on 4 November 2014, poet-editor Grace Chia, whose poetry collection Cordelia was shortlisted but did not win in the English Poetry section, delivered a speech in absentia at the Singapore Writers Festival which accused the Prize of sexism. Chia wrote, "The fact that the prize has been given to two co-winners who are both male poets is deeply informing of choice, taste and affirmation. A prize so coveted that it has been apportioned to two male narratives of poetic discourse, instead of one outstanding poet - reeks of an engendered privilege that continues to plague this nation's literary community." Chia also posted her speech on Facebook before subsequently removing it. In response, one of the poetry judges, poet and literary critic Gwee Li Sui, said, "All entries have an equal chance of consideration for winning, and we discussed it based on that point alone, and on the strengths of the collections." The other poetry judges were prominent female poet Leong Liew Geok and poet Boey Kim Cheng.

=== Fiction ===
==== English ====
- Winner: Amanda Lee Koe - Ministry of Moral Panic
- Claire Tham - The Inlet
- O Thiam Chin - Love, or Something Like Love
- Audrey Chin - As the Heart Bones Break

==== Chinese ====
- Winner: Lim Hung Chang (Lin Gao) - Weixingxiaoshuo(林高微型小说／林高)
- Lai Yong Taw - Ding Xiang (丁香／流军)
- Tham Yew Chin (You Jin) - Jin Se Dai Shu(金色袋鼠／尤今)
- Lee Xuan Lou - Shuang Cheng Zhi Lian(双城之恋／李选楼)

==== Malay ====
- Winner: Yazid bin Hussein - Kumpulan Cerpen (Armageddon)
- Abdul Manaf bin Abdul Kadir - Suzan
- Anuar bin Othman - Tenggelamnya Kapal (Prince of Wales)
- Hassan Hasaa'ree Ali - Selamat Malam (Caesar)
- Yazid bin Hussein - Cahaya
- Mohd Pitchay Gani bin Mohd Abdul Aziz - Seking

==== Tamil ====
- Winner: Mohamed Kassim Shanavas - Moontraavatu Kai
- Jayanthi Sankar - Muga Puthagamum Sila Agappakkangalum
- Suriya Rethnna - Naan
- Noorjehan binte Ahmadsha - Vergal
- Packinisamy Panneerselvam - Maaya
- Krishnamurthi Mathangi - Oru Kodi Dollargal

=== Poetry ===
==== English ====
- Co-winner: Joshua Ip - Sonnets from the Singlish
- Co-winner: Yong Shu Hoong - The Viewing Party
- Grace Chia - Cordelia
- Theophilus Kwek - The Circle Line
- Tania De Rozario - Tender Delirium
- Koh Jee Leong - The Pillow Book

==== Malay ====
- Winner: Johar Buang - Pasar Diri
- Peter Augustine Goh - Genta Cinta
- Ahmad Md Tahir - Aisberg Kesimpulan
- Hamed bin Ismail - Suara Dalam
- Yazid bin Hussein - nota (buat wangsa dan buanaku)

==== Tamil ====
- Commendation: Krishnamurthi Mathangi – Malaigalin Parathal
- Samuel Nepolian Devakumar – Kaanaamal Pona Kavithaikal
- Chinnadurai Arumugam – Thagam
- Pichinikkadu Elango – Thoorikai Sirpangal
- Swaminathan Amirthalingam – Urakkach Cholvaen

=== Non-fiction ===
==== English ====
- Co-winner: Lim Siong Guan - The Leader, The Teacher & You
- Co-winner: Josephine Chia - Kampong Spirit Gotong Royong: Life In Potong Pasir 1955 to 1965
- M. Ravi - Kampong Boy
- Hidayah Amin - The Mango Tree
- Fanny Lai - A Visual Celebration of Giant Pandas

==== Chinese ====
- Merit: Dr Ho Nai Kiong - The Biography of My Father 何乃强《父亲平藩的一生》
- Merit: Tham Yew Chin (You Jin) - Even The Heart Soars 尤今《心也飞翔》
- Dr Ho Nai Kiong - The Death of Kings and Emperors 何乃强《医生读史笔记》
- Tham Yew Chin (You Jin) - Release Your Happiness 尤今《释放快乐》

==== Malay ====
- Merit: Mohamed Latiff Mohamed - Alam Kepenyairan Singapura: Pengamatam dan Penciptaan

==== Tamil ====
- Winner: Kotti Thirumuruganandam - Singapore Tamil Kavithai Varalaaru (History Of Singapore Tamil Poetry)
- Chitra Ramesh - Oru Nakarathin Kathai (Story Of A City)
- R Kalamohan - Sattamum Sambavangalum (Law And Incidents)
- Mohamed Kassim Shanavas - Ayal Pasi (Foreign Hunger)

== Awards 2016 ==
The 2016 edition received the most submissions ever in its 25-year history: 235 entries, compared to 2014's 182 and 2012's 57, with fiction receiving the most submissions.

=== Fiction ===
==== English ====
- Winner: Sonny Liew - The Art of Charlie Chan Hock Chye
- Jeremy Tiang - It Never Rains on National Day
- Leonora Liow - Moth: Stories
- Audrey Chin - Nine Cuts
- Mohamed Latiff Mohamed, trans. Alfian Sa'at - The Widower

==== Chinese ====
- Commendation: 谢裕民 (Chia Joo Ming) - Exile or Pursuit《放逐与追逐》
- Commendation: 张挥 (Cheong Weng Yat aka Zhang Hui) - Shuang Kou Ding Yi Cun 《双口鼎一村－那些年那些事》
- Merit: 英培安 (Yeng Pway Ngon) - Opera Costume 《戲服》

==== Malay ====
- Winner: Peter Augustine Goh - Air Mata di Arafah
- Peter Augustine Goh - Bayang-Bayang Yang Hilang
- Suratman Markasan - Dari Perang Datang Sampai Kamoe San Masuk Melayu
- Leyla Shuri - Terbelah Bintang Subaru

==== Tamil ====
- Winner: Sithuraj Ponraj - Maariligal
- Krishnamurthi Mathangi - Melbaculaso
- Suriya Rethnna - Paramapadham

=== Poetry ===
==== English ====
- Co-winner: Cyril Wong - The Lover's Inventory
- Co-winner: Desmond Kon Zhicheng-Mingde - I Didn’t Know Mani Was a Conceptualist
- Eric Tinsay Valles - After the Fall: Dirges Among Ruins
- Tse Hao Guang - Deeds of Light
- Gwee Li Sui - One Thousand and One Nights
- Cheryl Julia Lee - We Were Always Eating Expired Things

==== Chinese ====
- Merit: 吳耀宗 (Gabriel Wu) - Live Where the Imagination Is 《逐想像而居》
- Merit: 陈维彪 (Tang Jui Piow) - The Sea Diary 《航海纪事》
- 沈璧浩 (Sim Piak How) - A City's Story《都市录》

==== Malay ====
- Winner: Hamed Ismail, Hartinah Ahmad, and Samsudin Said - Tafsiran Tiga Alam
- Noor Aisya bte Buang - Kastil Aisya
- Leo Suryadinatan - Kota Singa

==== Tamil ====
- Merit: Varadharajan AK - 4 Flowered Garland for Singapore
- Merit: Sithuraj Ponraj - Kaatraai Kadanthaai
- Naa Aandeappan - Adolescent Love
- Malarvizhi Elangovan - Alai Pidunkiya Sorkal
- Saba Muthunatarajan - The Face of the Soul
- Segar s/o Muniandy - Kaivilakku Kadavul

=== Non-fiction ===
==== English ====
- Co-winner: Danielle Lim - The Sound of Sch: A Mental Breakdown, A Life Journey
- Co-winner: Peh Shing Huei - When the Party Ends
- You Jin, trans. Shelly Bryant - In Time, Out of Place
- Loke Hoe Yeong - Let the People Have Him
- Ning Cai - Who is Magic Babe Ning?

==== Chinese ====
- Winner: 陈加昌 (Chin Kah Chong) - LKY Whom I Knew 《我所知道的李光耀》
- 尤今 (You Jin) - Father and I《父亲与我》
- 李慧敏 (Lee Hui Min) - Growing Up in the Era of Lee Kuan Yew 《成长在李光耀时代》
- 李国樑 (Lee Kok Leong) - Guangdong Majie 《广东妈姐》
- 柯思仁 (Quah Sy Ren) - Tea Time in Spring With Poetry 《以诗和春光佐茶》

==== Malay ====
- Merit: Ahmad Azmi bin Haji Mohamed Ishak - Rentak Rebana
- Commendation: Hafiza Talib - Sekolahku Tinggal Kenangan

==== Tamil ====
- Commendation: Kotti Thirumuruganandam - CK Makadoom Saiboo and Singai Nes
- Commendation: Varadharajan AK - Kamban Kaattum Kanaikal
- Commendation: Mohamed Kassim Shanavas - Nanavu Desam SG50
- Commendation: SP Panneer Selvam - Singapore Tamil Munnodigal

== Awards 2018 ==
=== Fiction ===
==== English ====
- Winner: Jeremy Tiang - State of Emergency
- Balli Kaur Jaswal - Sugarbread
- Jennani Durai - Regrettable Things that Happened Yesterday
- Nuraliah Norasid - The Gatekeeper
- Wong Souk Yee - Death of a Perm Sec

==== Chinese ====
- Co-Winner: Lee Chuan Low - Rescue Frontline
- Co-Winner: Zhang Hui - Smoker Memories
- Lin Gao - Life Between Frames
- Xi Ni Er - The Floating Republic
- Li Qing Song - Manuscript – Collection of Short Stories

==== Malay ====
- Merit: Hamed bin Ismail - A Dancing Club: Bunga Tanjong
- Commendation: Adam bin Fadilla - Muezzin in Search of Light
- Commendation: Farihan Bahron - Avatar's Wrath
- Djohan A Rahman - When the Alphabets Dance
- Hassan Hassa'Ree Ali - Souvenir From Space

==== Tamil ====
- Merit: Chitra Ramesh - A Drop of Happiness
- Merit: M K Kumar - 5.12 pm
- Prema Mahalingam - Water Droplets

=== Poetry ===
==== English ====
- Winner: Samuel Lee - A Field Guide to Supermarkets in Singapore

==== Chinese ====
- Winner: Tan Chee Lay - Landmark Poetics of the Lion City

==== Malay ====
- Winner: Farihan Bahron - Finger-Pointing Expert

==== Tamil ====
- Commendation: M Segar - Ravana's Seethai
- Commendation: A K Varadharajan - Lee Kwan Yew Imaginary Childhood

=== Non-fiction ===
==== English ====
- Winner: Melissa De Silva - "Others" is Not a Race

==== Chinese ====
- Co-Winner: Liu Su - Roses at the Edge
- Co-Winner: Weng Xian-wei - The Second Face

==== Malay ====
- Commendation: Ahmad Md Tahir - Colour of Expression

==== Tamil ====
- Winner: Bala Baskaran - G Sarangapany and the Tamil Murasu: A Current Appraisal

== Awards 2020 ==
Year	Fiction	Poetry	Non-Fiction
2020	Malay Pointing the Sky by Jamal Ismail Labyrinth of Al Maut by Noor Aisya Buang Chinese Black Panther by Wong Koi Tet Kian Kok by Chia Joo Ming English Nimita’s Place by Akshita Nanda Lion City by Ng Yi-Sheng Tamil The Wooden Elephant by Sithuraj Ponraj Carriage will also board the Barge a day by Yousuf Rowther Rajid	Malay Sepatu Mimpi by Samsudin Said Chinese Love Comes Into Shape by Gabriel Wu English Gaze Back by Marylyn Tan Tamil It is Easy to be an Italian by Sithuraj Ponraj	Malay The Philosophy of Singapore Malay Creative Writing Process by Mohamed Pitchay Gani Mohamed Abdul Aziz Chinese dakota by Wong Koi Tet English Pulp II: A Visual Bibliography of the Banished Book by Shubigi Rao Tamil Banana Money by V. Hemalatha

== Awards 2024 ==
=== Fiction ===
==== English ====
- Winner: Prasanthi Ram - Nine Yard Sarees: a short story cycle

==== Chinese ====
- Winner: Hai Fan - The Back View of the Rainforest

==== Malay ====
- Winner: Farihan Bahron - Age Antidode

==== Tamil ====
- Winner: Kanagalatha K - Cheenalakshumi

=== Best Debut ===
==== English ====
- Winner: Peter Ellinger - Down Memory Lane: Peter Ellinger's Memoirs

===== Chinese =====
- Winner: Chua Ee Gein - Memories Overflowing with Emotion

==== Tamil ====
- Winner: Tamilselvi Rajarajan - Kaatralalyll

=== Poetry ===
==== English ====
- Winner: Yong Shu Hoong - Anatomy of a Wave

==== Chinese ====
- Co-Winner: Wang Zhe (Poet) - Mediocre
- Co-Winner: Tan Chee Lay - Poems from the Eternal Summer

==== Malay ====
- Winner: Samsudin Said - In the Name of Love

==== Tamil ====
- Winner: Mathikumar Thayamanavan - Yaamakkodangi - The Night messenger

=== Creative Non-fiction ===
==== English ====
- Winner: Shubigi Rao - Pulp III: An Intimate Inventory of the Banished Book

==== Chinese ====
- Winner: Chia Joo Ming - The Uncertain Republic: Lee Kuan Yew and Singapore

==== Tamil ====
- Winner: Azhagunila - Appan

==== Comics/Graphic Novel ====
- Winner: Kenfoo - COCKMAN

==== Translation ====
- Winner: Jeremy Tiang: Zhang Yueran - Cocoon
