= Alecia Neo =

Singaporean artist (born 1986)

- Born: 1986 (age 39–40); Singapore
- Education: Nanyang Technological University
- Known for: Visual art, socially engaged art, sensory installations
- Notable work: Unseen: Touch Field (2014), Unseen: Constellations (2015), Power to the People (2019), Care Index: Performing Care (2023)
- Awards: Young Artist Award (2016), Singapore Youth Award (2019)
- Website: Official website

Alecia Neo (born 1986) is a Singaporean visual artist. She is known for her series of Unseen long-term projects that are developed with individuals with visual-impairment.

== Early life and education ==
Neo is the middle child in a working-class family. She studied photography at the School of Art, Design and Media at Nanyang Technological University.

== Career ==
Neo is the founder of Unseen Art Initiatives, a Singapore-based art platform for professional and emerging disabled artists. She is also one of the artistic directors of Ubah Rumah Residency on Nikoi island in Indonesia, and co-founder of Brack, an art collective and platform for socially engaged art.

Neo received the Young Artist Award in 2016, Singapore's highest award for young arts practitioners, aged 35 and below. She was also awarded the Singapore Youth Award in 2019.

== Works ==
=== Unseen: Touch Field (2014) ===
Sensory installation that included braille drawings, sound and video.

=== Unseen: Constellations (2015) ===
Large-scale multi-sensory installation developed with visually-impaired students to share their hopes and dreams.

=== Power to the People (2019) ===
Site-specific installation to commemorate the centenary of the Bauhaus and pays tribute to the hardware and software of Pasir Panjang Power Station.

=== Care Index: Performing Care (2023) ===
A video triptych on how care practices affect the carer's own body, the pervasiveness of self-care industries, and how bodies could resist the pressures of bureaucratic or capitalistic systems.
