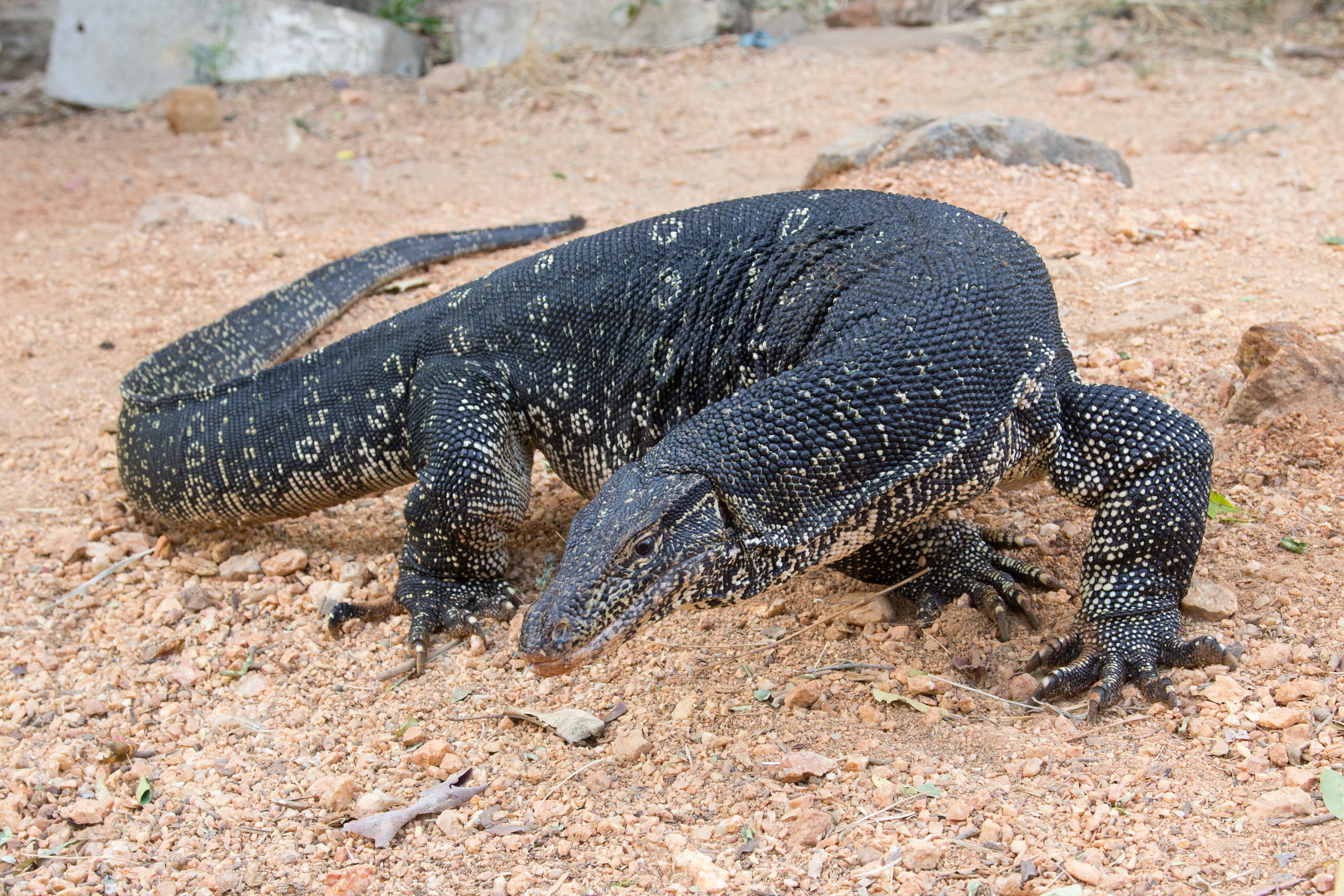
- V. s. salvator

Conservation status
- Least Concern (IUCN 3.1)
- CITES Appendix II

Scientific classification
- Kingdom: Animalia
- Phylum: Chordata
- Class: Reptilia
- Order: Squamata
- Suborder: Anguimorpha
- Family: Varanidae
- Genus: Varanus
- Subgenus: Soterosaurus
- Species: V. salvator

Binomial name
- Varanus salvator (Laurenti, 1768)
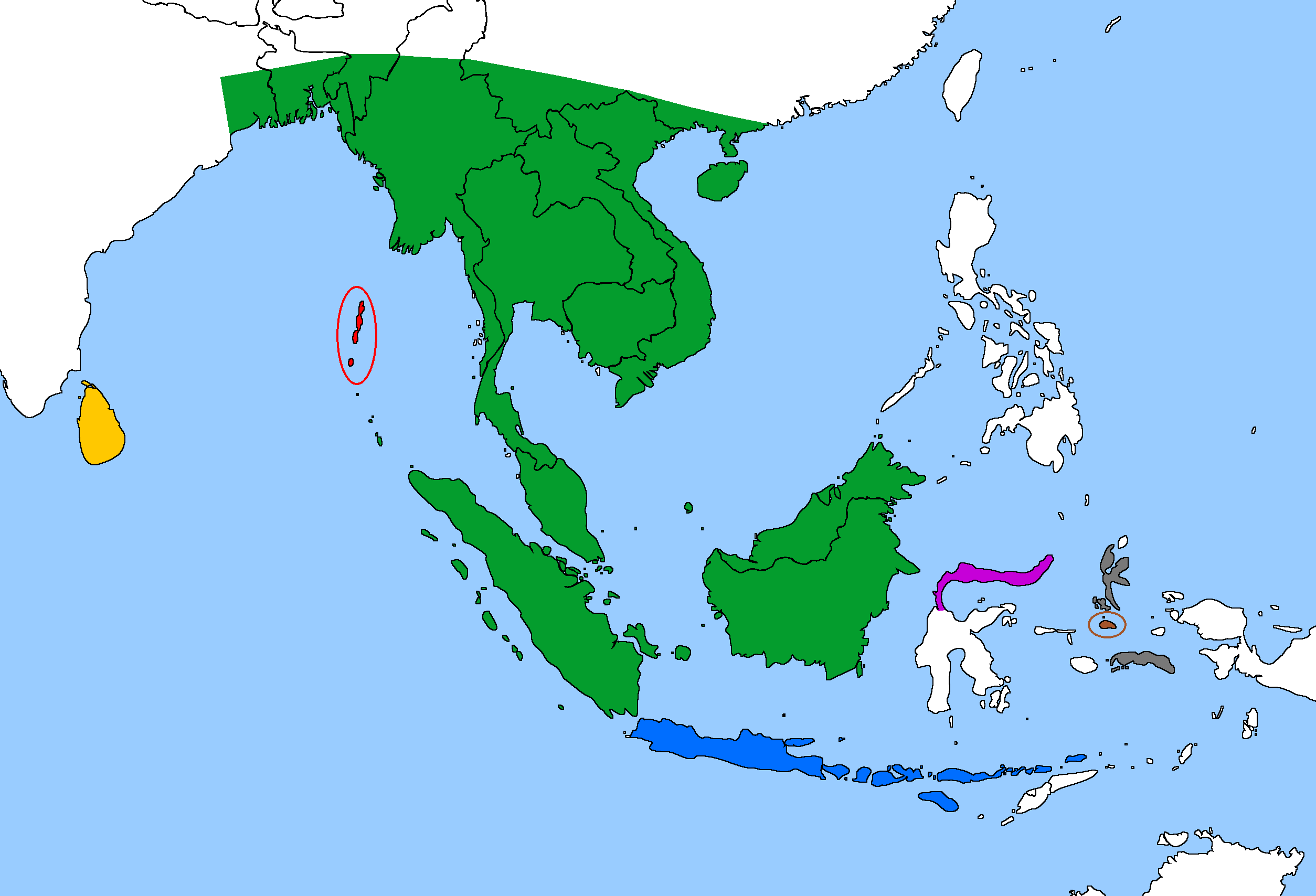
- Range of Asian water monitor subspecies: Yellow: V. s. salvator, Green: V. s. macromaculatus, Blue: V. s. bivittatus, Red: V. s. andamanensis, Purple: V. s. celebensis, Brown: V. s. ziegleri, Grey: Unconfirmed water monitor populations of unclear subspecies or species

= Asian water monitor =

Species of lizard

The Asian water monitor (Varanus salvator) is a large varanid lizard native to South and Southeast Asia. It is widely considered to be the second-largest lizard species, after the Komodo dragon. It is distributed from eastern and northeastern India and Bangladesh, the Andaman and Nicobar Islands, Sri Lanka, through southern China and Hainan Island in the east to Mainland Southeast Asia and the islands of Sumatra, Borneo, Java, Lombok, the Riau Archipelago, and Sulawesi. It is one of the most widespread monitor lizards.

The Asian water monitor has a natural affinity towards water, inhabiting the surroundings of lakes, rivers, ponds, swamps, and various riparian habitats, including sewers, city parks, and urban waterways. It is an excellent swimmer and hunts fish, frogs, invertebrates, water birds, and other aquatic and amphibious prey.

Due to its apparently large, stable population, it is currently listed as Least Concern on to the IUCN Red List.

== Etymology ==
The generic name Varanus is derived from the Arabic waral (ورل), which translates as "monitor". The specific name is the Latin word for "saviour", denoting a possible religious connotation.

== Taxonomy ==
Stellio salvator was the scientific name used by Josephus Nicolaus Laurenti in 1768 when he described a water monitor specimen. It was subordinated to the genus Varanus by Theodore Cantor in 1847. There is a significant amount of taxonomic uncertainty within this species complex. Morphological analyses have begun to unravel this taxonomic uncertainty but molecular studies are needed to test and confirm the validity of certain groupings within this genus. Research initiatives such as these are very important to assess changes in conservation assessments.

The Asian water monitor is a member of the subgenus Soterosaurus, as well as the eponymous Varanus salvator species complex, which comprises all Soterosaurus species other than the black rough-necked monitor.

=== Subspecies ===
Subspecies	Common name	Distribution	Image
V. s. salvator	Sri Lankan water monitor	Restricted to Sri Lanka	
V. s. andamanensis	Andaman Islands water monitor	Andaman Islands and the southern Nicobar Islands; the type locality is Port Blair.	
V. s. bivittatus (Mertens 1959)	Two-striped water monitor	Indonesian islands of Java, Bali, Lombok, Sumbawa, Flores, Alor, Wetar and some neighbouring islands within the Sunda archipelago. The type locality is Java.	
V. s. macromaculatus	Southeast Asian water monitor	Bihar, West Bengal to Assam, Arunachal Pradesh, Manipur and Meghalaya through Bangladesh, Myanmar, Thailand, Cambodia, Laos, Vietnam to Malaysia, Singapore, Sumatra, Borneo, Bali, Bangka, Batam, Belitung, Bintan, Enggano, Matak, Nikoi. The type specimen was captured in Thailand.	
V. s. ziegleri	Ziegler's water monitor	Obi Islands, North Maluku, Indonesia.	
V. s. celebensis	Sulawesi water monitor	North Sulawesi Province of the island of Sulawesi, Indonesia.	

Nota bene: Varanus cumingi, Varanus marmoratus, and Varanus nuchalis were classified as subspecies until 2007, when they were elevated to full species.

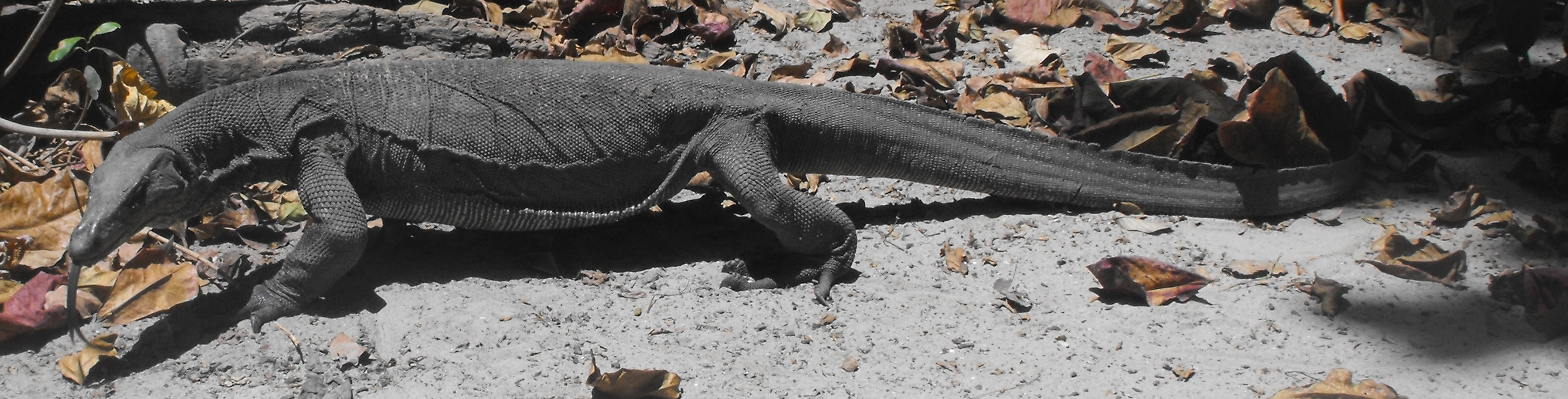
Melanistic Southeast Asian water monitor

The black water monitor from Thailand's Satun Province and Thai-Malaysian border area was formerly the subspecies V. s. komaini, but now is regarded as a junior synonym and melanistic population of V. s. macromaculatus.

== Description ==
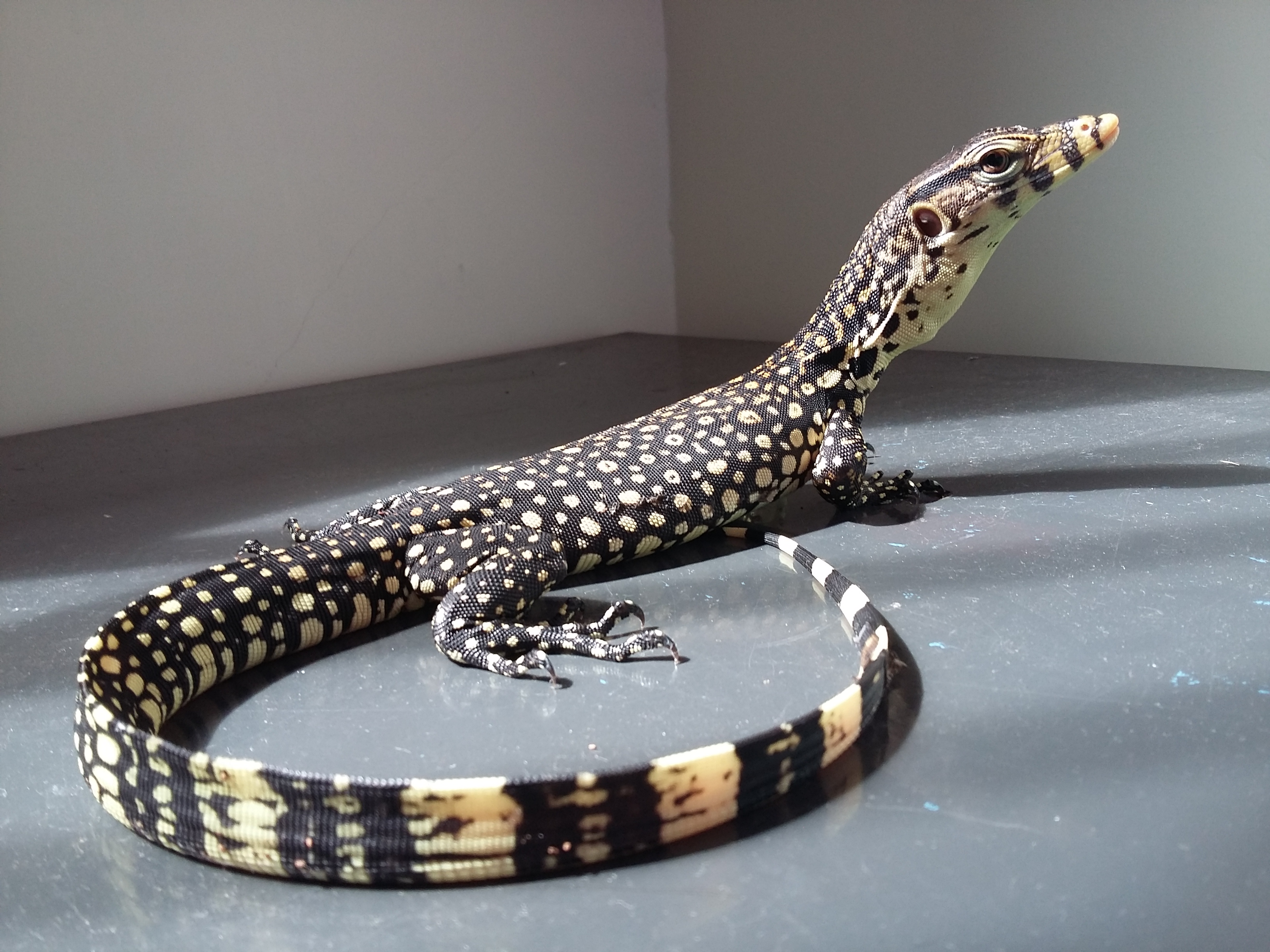
Young water monitor

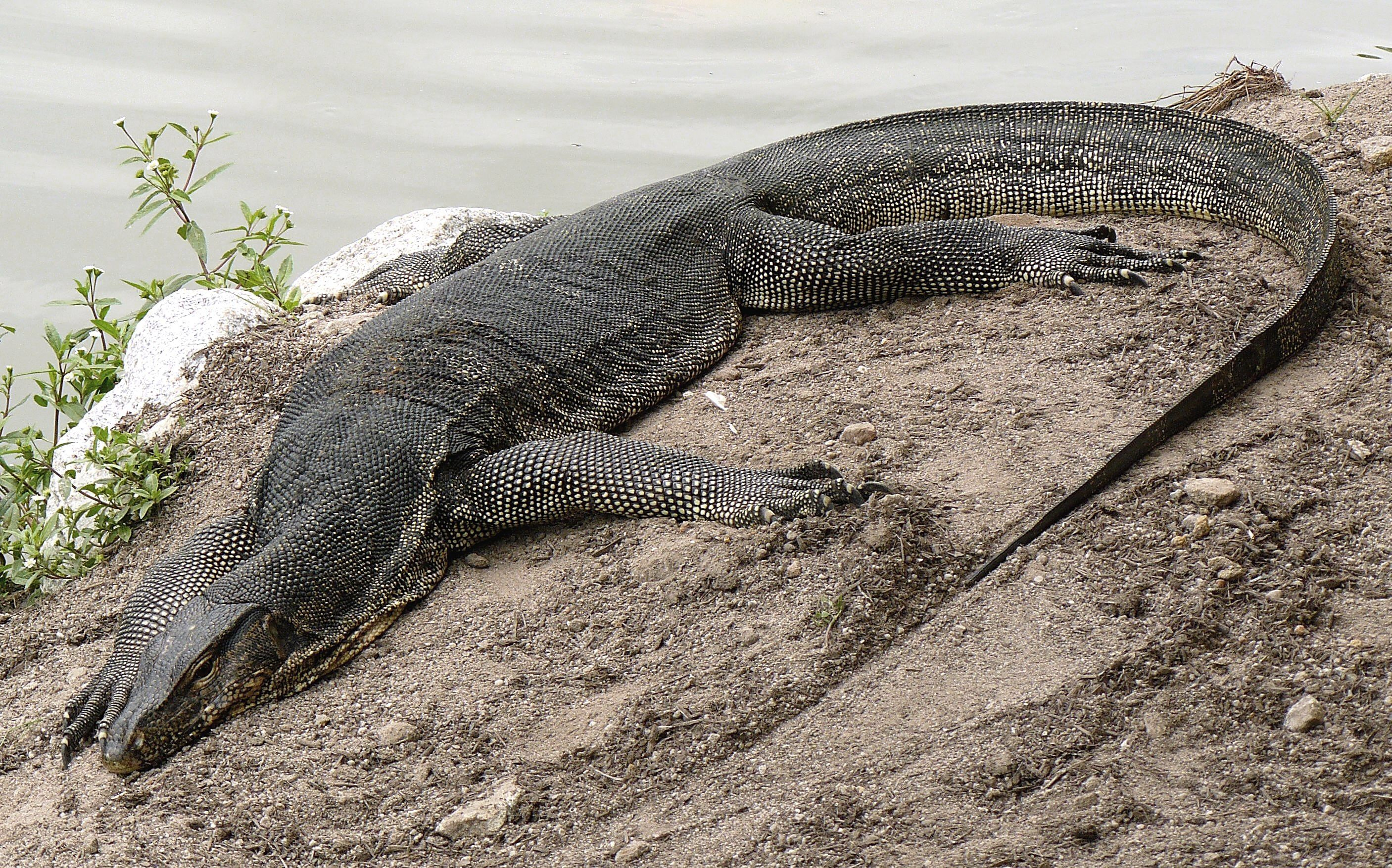
V. s. macromaculatus

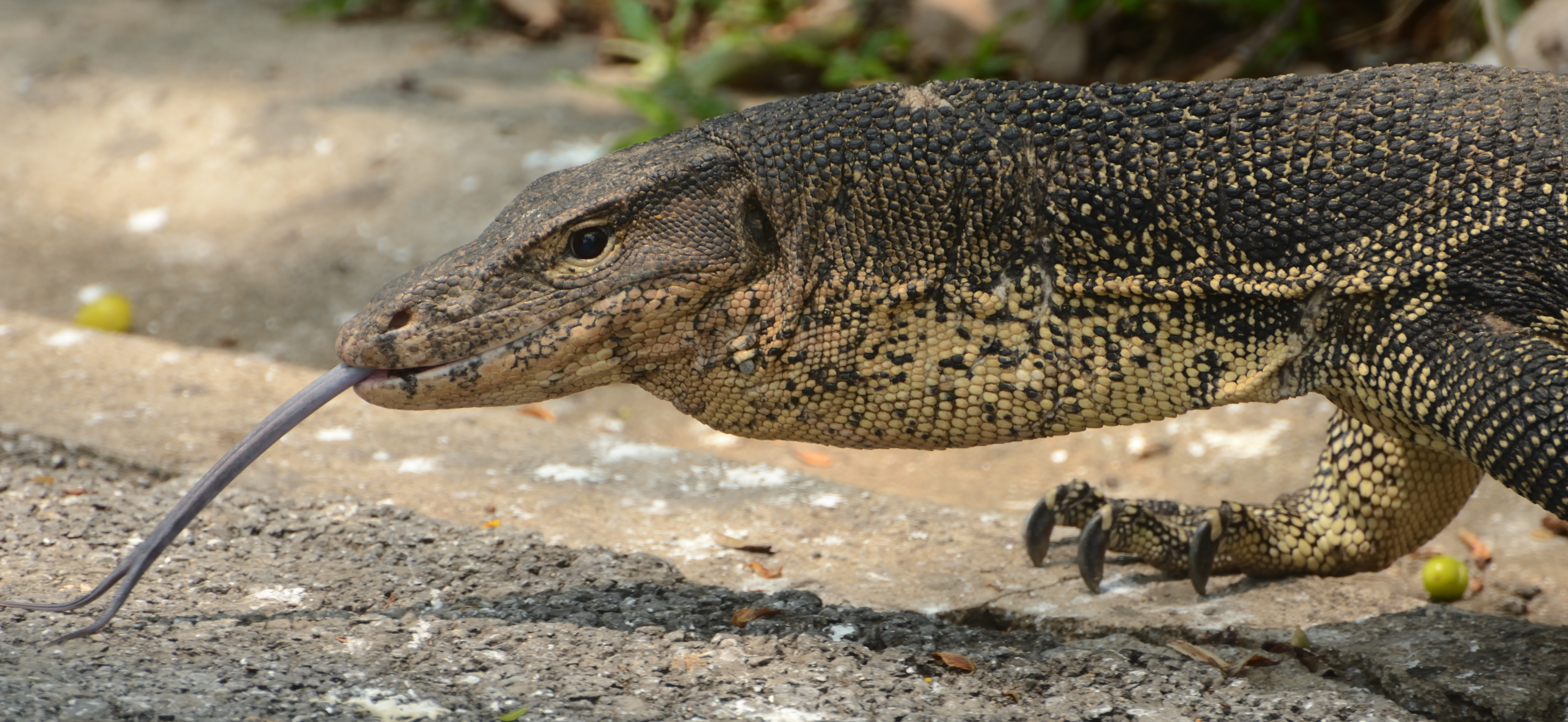
Closeup showing split tongue

The Asian water monitor is dark brown or blackish with yellow spots on the underside that fade gradually with age. It has blackish bands with yellow edges extending back from each eye. Its body is muscular, with long, powerful, laterally compressed tail. Its scales are keeled; the ones on top of the head are larger than those on the back. Its neck is long and its snout is elongated. It has powerful jaws, serrated teeth and sharp claws.

Adults rarely exceed 1.5–2 m (4 ft 11 in – 6 ft 7 in) in length, but the largest specimen on record from Sri Lanka measured 3.21 m (10.5 ft). A common mature weight is 19.5 kg (43 lb). However, 80 males killed for the leather trade in Sumatra averaged only 3.42 kg (7.5 lb) and 56.6 cm (22.3 in) snout-to-vent and 142 cm (56 in) in total length; 42 females averaged 3.52 kg (7.8 lb) and 59 cm (23 in) snout–vent length and 149.6 cm (58.9 in) in total length. Males are larger than females and attain breeding maturity at a length of 40 cm (16 in) and a weight of 1 kg (2.2 lb); and females at a length of 50 cm (20 in).

A series of adults weighed 7.6 kg (17 lb). Mature individuals in northern Sumatra were estimated to have a mean estimated body mass of 20 kg (44 lb). A sample of 55 Asian water monitors weighed 2–32 kg (4.4–70.5 lb). The maximum weight of captive individuals is over 50 kg (110 lb).

The teeth are compressed, recurved and serrated, though irregularly. Up to two replacement teeth lie behind each tooth position at a given time, and teeth are replaced every 59 days.

== Distribution and habitat ==
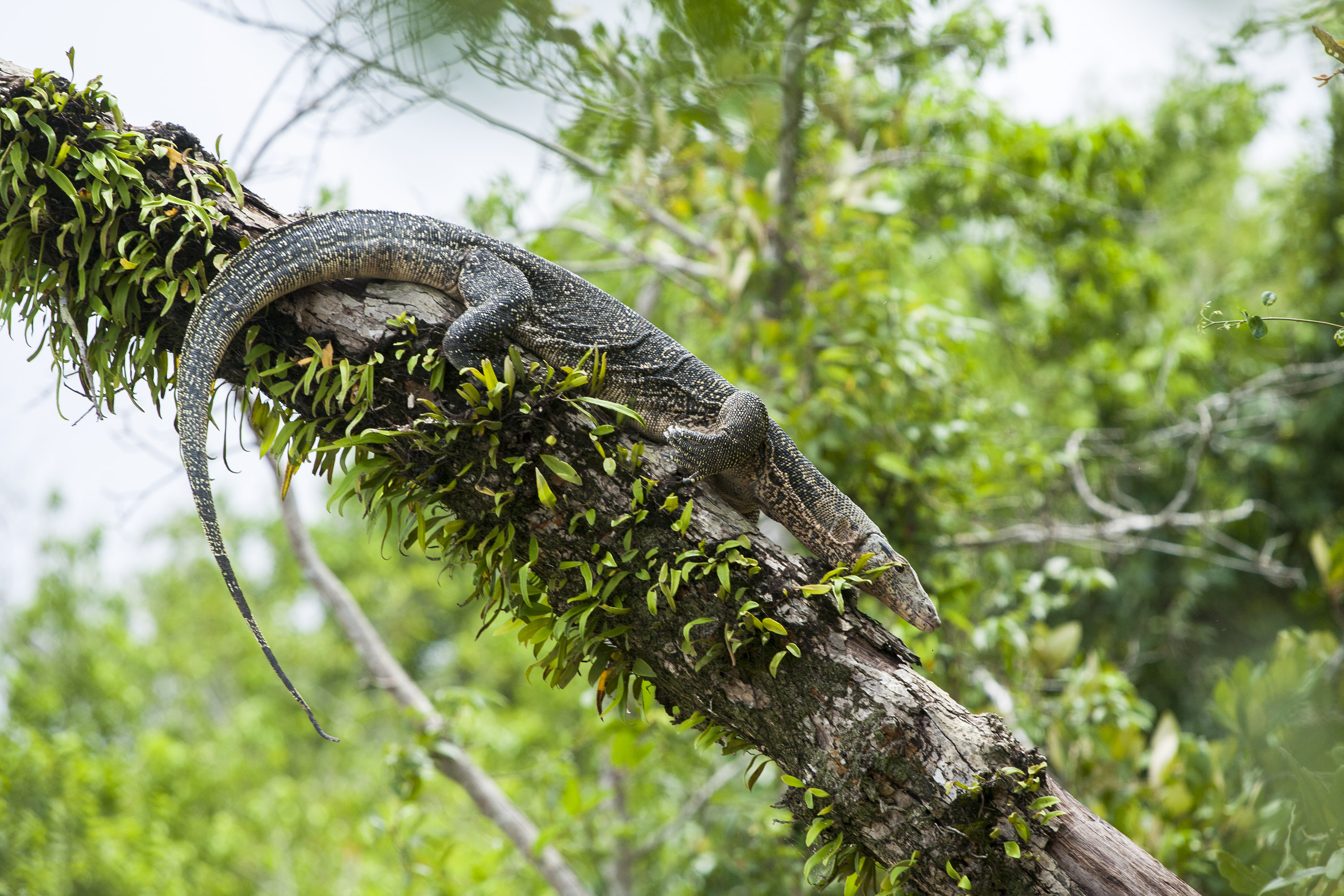
V. s. macromaculatus in a tree, in Sundarbans East Wildlife Sanctuary

The Asian water monitor is widely distributed from India, Bangladesh, Sri Lanka, Myanmar and Thailand excluding the north and northeastern parts., Cambodia, Laos, Vietnam, the Chinese Guangxi and Hainan provinces, Malaysia, Singapore to the Sunda islands Sumatra, Java, Bali, Borneo and Sulawesi. It inhabits primarily lowland freshwater and brackish wetlands. It has been recorded up to an elevation of 1,800 m (5,900 ft).

The Asian water monitor is semiaquatic and opportunistic; it inhabits a variety of natural habitats though predominantly resides in primary forests and mangrove swamps. It has been noted that it is not deterred from living in areas near human civilization. In fact, it has been known to adapt and thrive in agricultural areas as well as cities with canal systems, such as in Sri Lanka, where they are not hunted or persecuted. Habitats that are considered to be most important are mangrove vegetation, swamps, wetlands, and elevations below 1,000 m (3,300 ft). It does not thrive in habitats with extensive loss of natural vegetation and aquatic resources. It prefers cool areas in a habitat compared to other large lizards.

A population of these monitors have become established as an invasive population in the southeastern parts of the USA.

== Behaviour and ecology ==
Water monitors robbing eggs from a nest. Illustration by Pierre Jacques Smit, from Richard Lydekker's The Royal Natural History, 1893–1896

Water monitors defend themselves using their tails, claws, and jaws. They are excellent swimmers, using the raised fin on their tails to steer through water. When encountering smaller prey items, the water monitor will subdue it in its jaws and proceed to violently thrash its neck, destroying the prey's organs and spine which leaves it dead or incapacitated. The lizard will then swallow it whole.

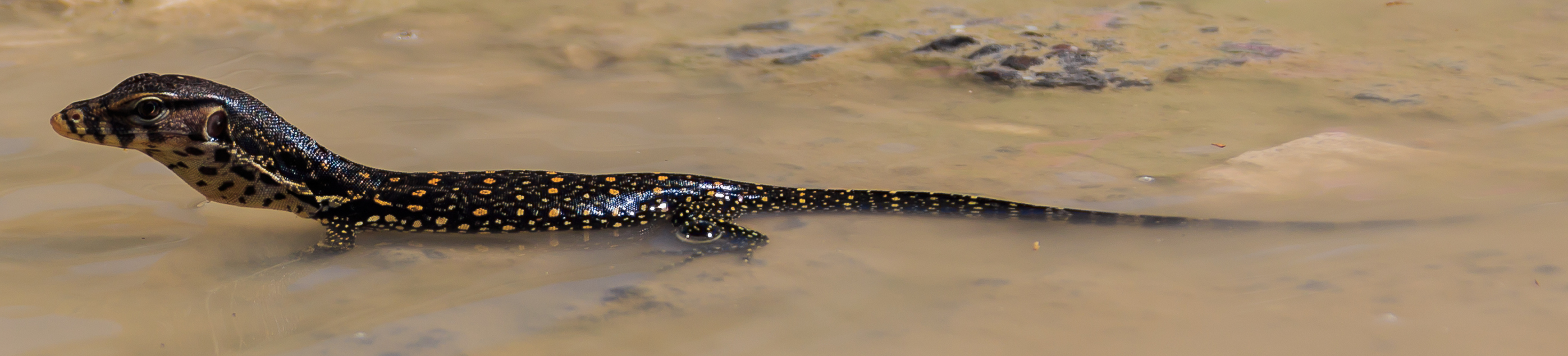
Asian water monitor hatchling

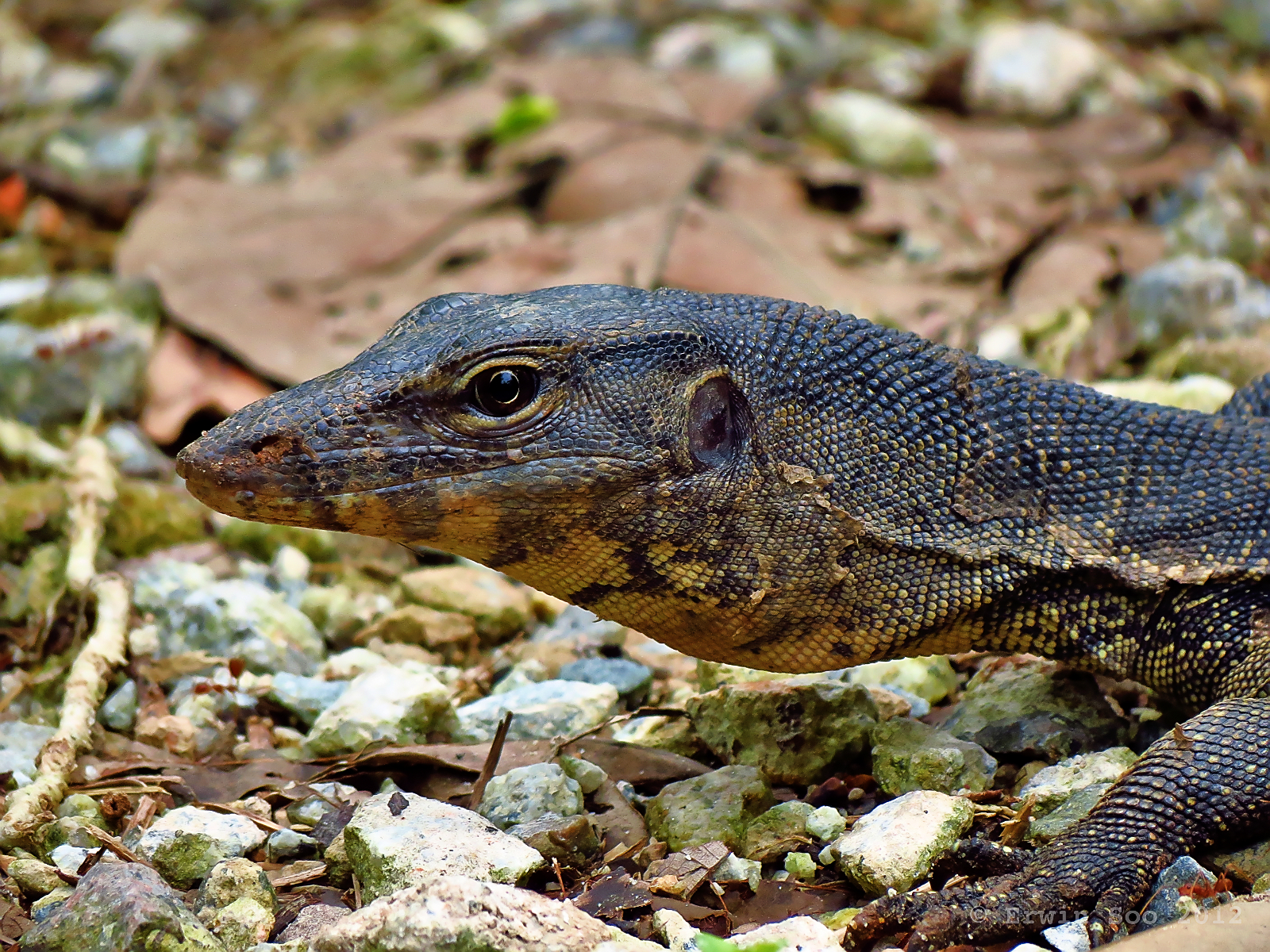
Juvenile Asian water monitor

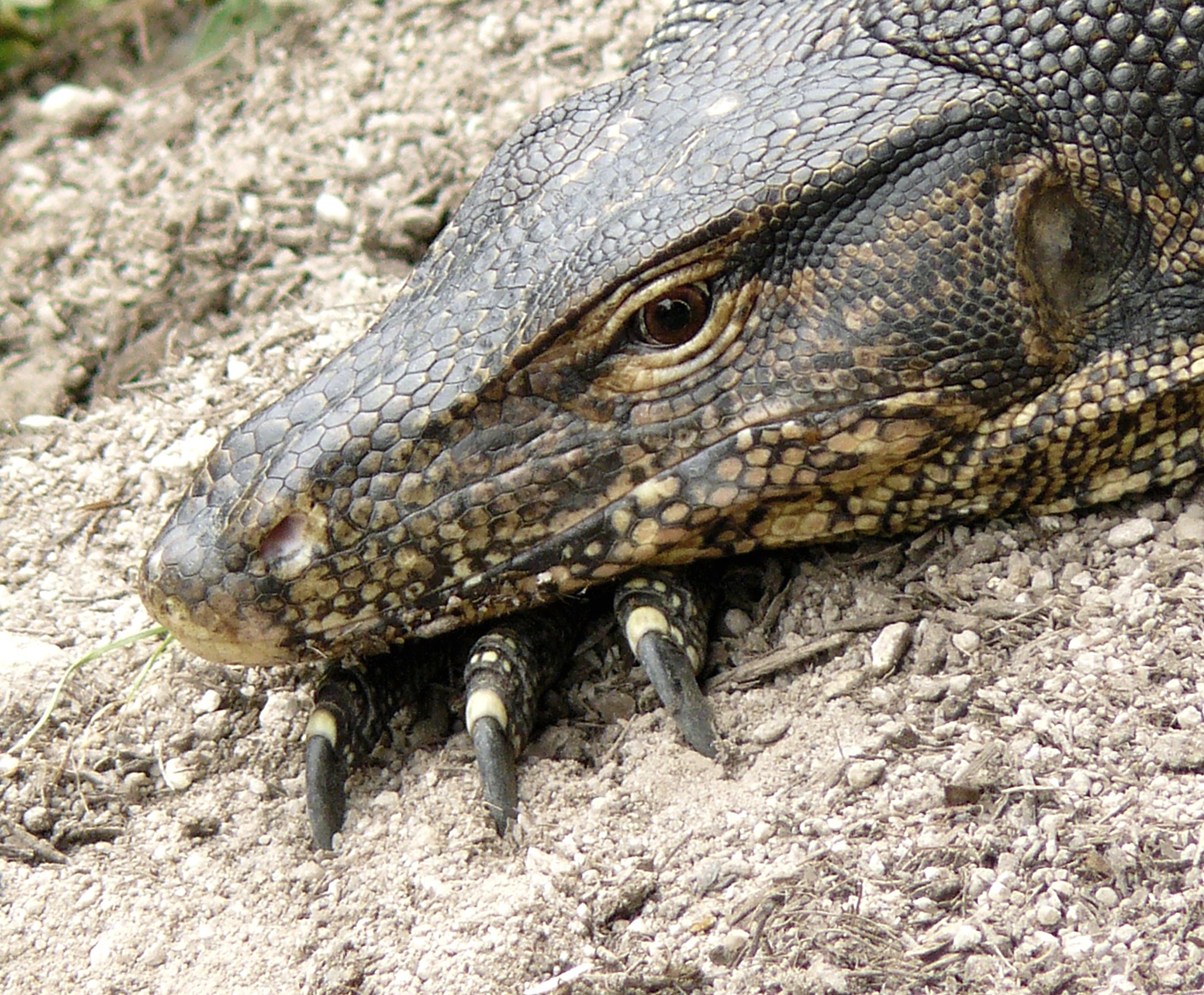
Adult Asian water monitor

In dominantly aquatic habitats, their semiaquatic behavior is considered to provide a measure of safety from predators. This along with their versatile diet is said to contribute to their plasticity, or ecological adaptability. When hunted by predators such as the king cobra (Ophiophagus hannah) they will climb trees using their powerful legs and claws. If this evasion is not enough to escape danger, they have also been known to jump from trees into streams for safety, a tactic similar to that of the green iguana (Iguana iguana).

On the island of Flores, it is sympatric with the Komodo dragon. Like the Komodo dragon, the water monitor often eats carrion, or rotten flesh. By eating this decaying flesh, the Asian water monitor provides benefits to the ecosystem by removing infectious elements, cleaning the environment.

While adults are terrestrial, juveniles are primarily arboreal.

The first description of the water monitor and its behaviour in English literature was made in 1681 by Robert Knox, who observed it during his long confinement in the Kingdom of Kandy: "There is a creature here called Kobberaguion, resembling an Alligator. The biggest may be five or six feet long, speckled black and white. He lives most upon the Land, but will take the water and dive under it: hath a long blue forked tongue like a sting, which he puts forth and hisseth and gapeth, but doth not bite nor sting, tho the appearance of him would scare those that knew not what he was. He is not afraid of people, but will lie gaping and hissing at them in the way, and will scarce stir out of it. He will come and eat Carrion with the Dogs and Jackals, and will not be scared away by them, but if they come near to bark or snap at him, with his tail, which is long like a whip, he will so slash them, that they will run away and howl."

=== Reproduction ===
The Asian water monitor breeds between April and October. The females lay eggs about a month after mating in rotting logs or stumps. A clutch varies from 10 to 40 eggs with an incubation period of 6 to 7 months. When hatched, hatchlings are fully developed and independent. Once males and females reach a length of about 150 cm (59 in), respectively, they will become reproductively mature and able to breed.

Captive Asian water monitors' life expectancy has been determined to be anywhere between 11 and 25 years depending on conditions, in the wild it is considerably shorter.

=== Diet ===
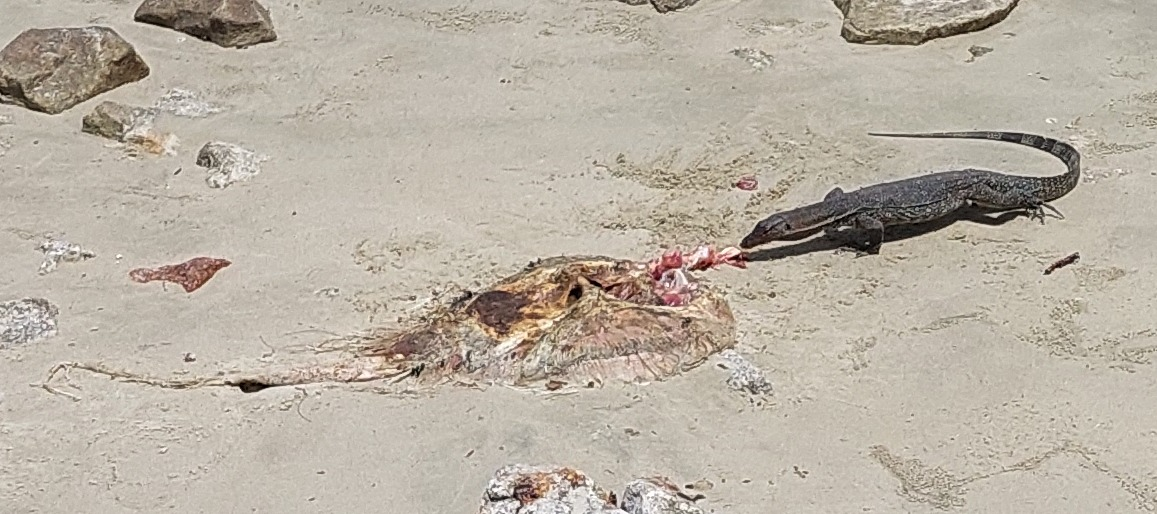
Asian water monitor feeding on a beached stingray carcass

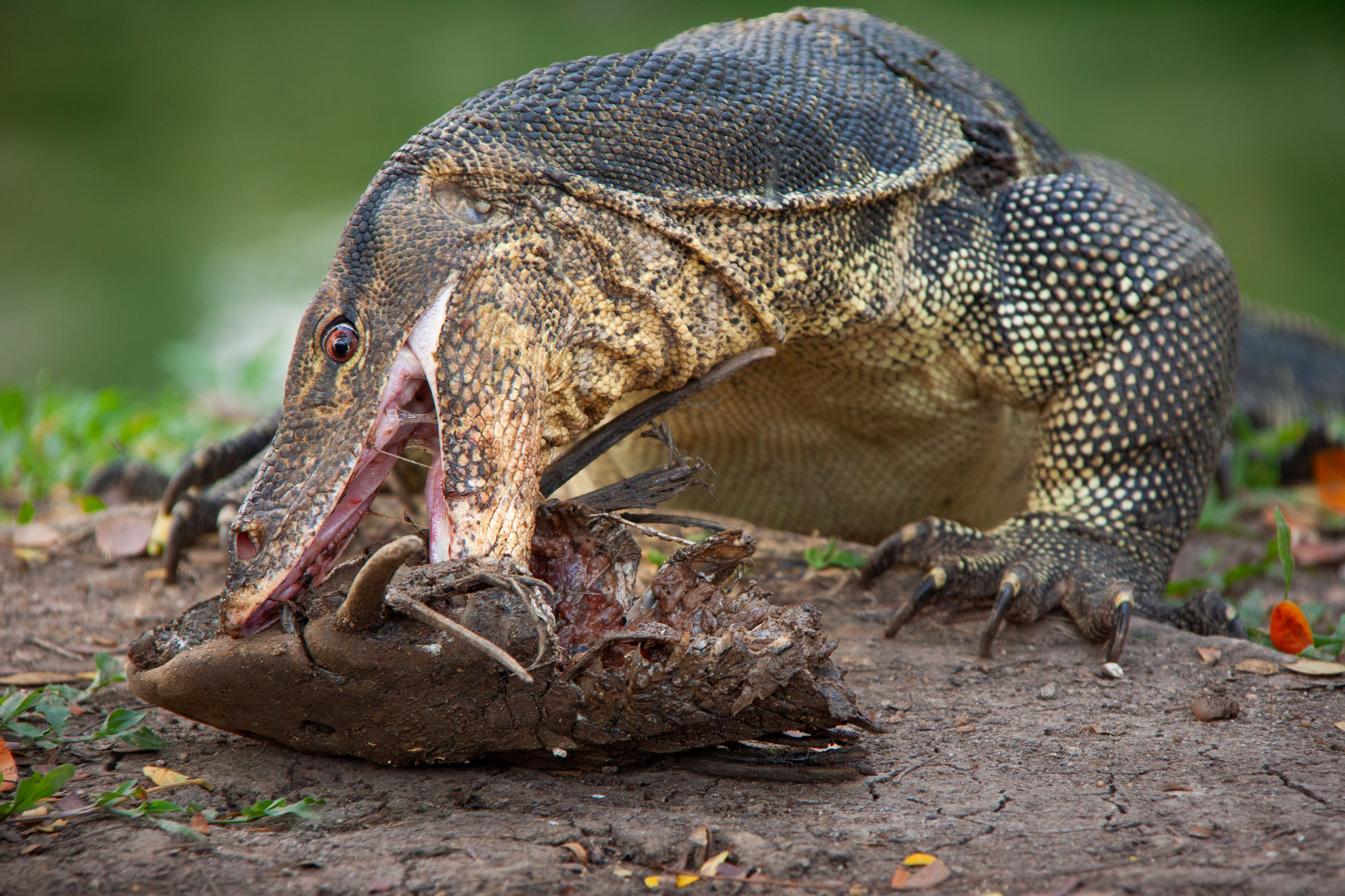
Asian water monitor eating a fish head

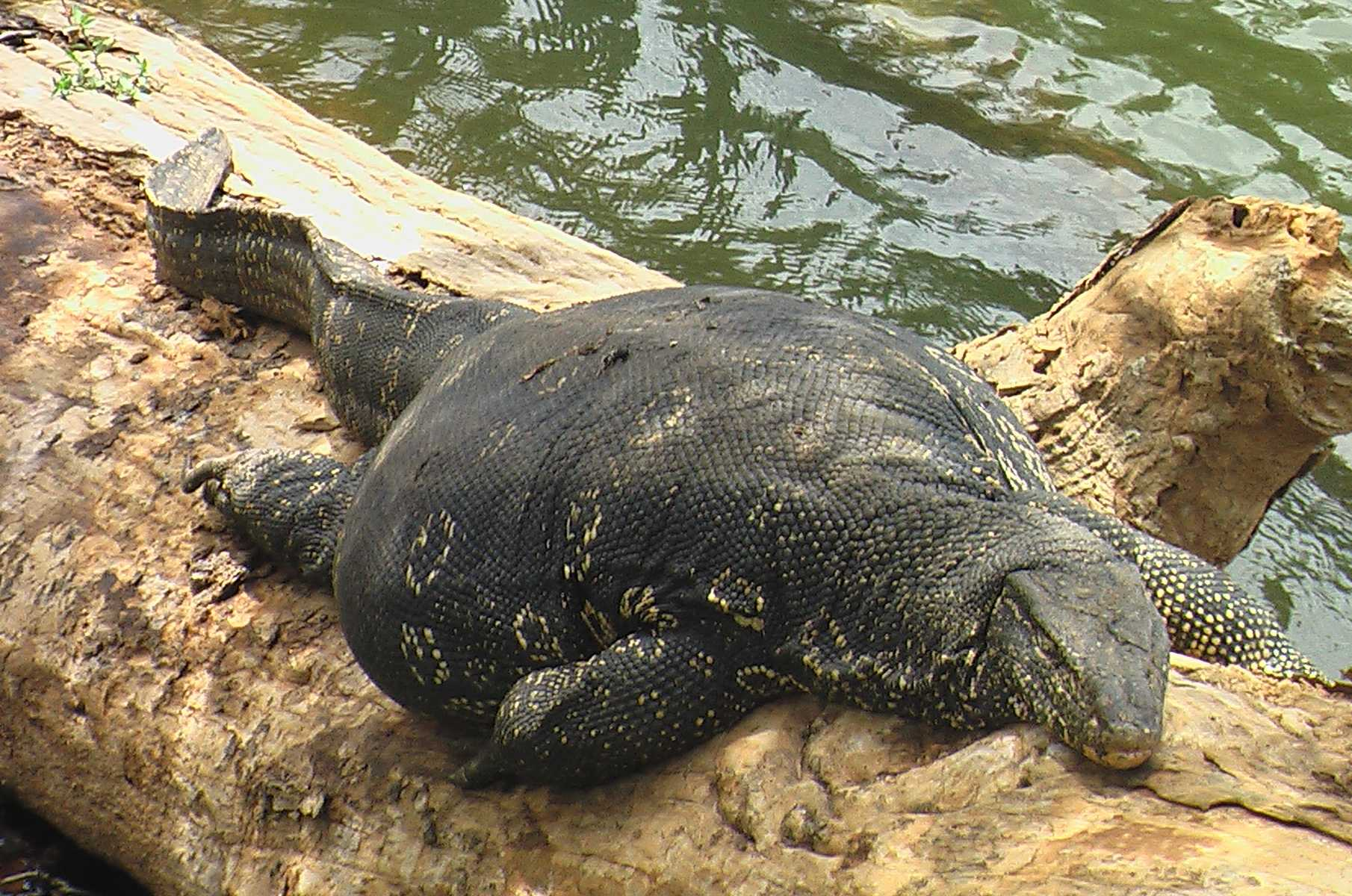
Asian water monitor at Kandy Lake (Bogambara lake), Sri Lanka. Possibly obese or pregnant, or both.

The Asian water monitor is carnivorous and consumes a wide range of prey. It eats fish, frogs, rodents, birds and their eggs, crabs, molluscs, insects, other lizards and snakes. It also eats turtles, young crocodiles, crocodile eggs, monkeys and small deer.

Water monitors have been observed eating catfish in a fashion similar to a mammalian carnivore, tearing off chunks of meat with their sharp teeth while holding it with their front legs and then separating different parts of the fish for sequential consumption. They feed on suckermouth catfish in Thailand, which helps manage their booming population since they are not eaten by the human population there. In Java, they have also been recorded entering caves at night to hunt bats that have fallen from cave's ceiling.

The diet of the Asian water monitor in an urban area in central Thailand includes fish, crabs, Malayan snail-eating turtles (Malayemys macrocephala), Chinese edible frogs (Hoplobatrachus rugulosus), birds, small rodents, domestic cats (Felis catus) and dogs (Canis familiaris), chickens (Gallus gallus domesticus), food scraps and carcasses. On one hand, their presence can be helpful in locating a missing person in forensic investigations, on the other hand, they can inflict further injuries to the corpse, complicating ascertainment of the cause of death. The stomachs of 20 adult Asian water monitors caught on Redang Island contained mostly human food waste, followed by turtle eggs and hatchlings, crabs and lizard eggs. The Asian water monitor does not thrive in these areas, but manages to live in them. Studies are being conducted in order to understand how it is able to do so in and around human civilization.

In Sri Lanka, human corpses are often scavenged on by V. s. salvator, which can make it hard to identify the deceased, or to run autopsies. For instance, the feeding marks made by a monitor's sharp claws resemble wounds made by bladed weapons. In one case, however, the presence of eight dead water monitors near the corpse of a partially scavenged 51-year-old man prompted investigation that revealed the possibility that the man died from poisoning after ingesting a bottle of Carbosulfan pesticide, which then poisoned the water monitors that scavenged on the body.

=== Venom ===
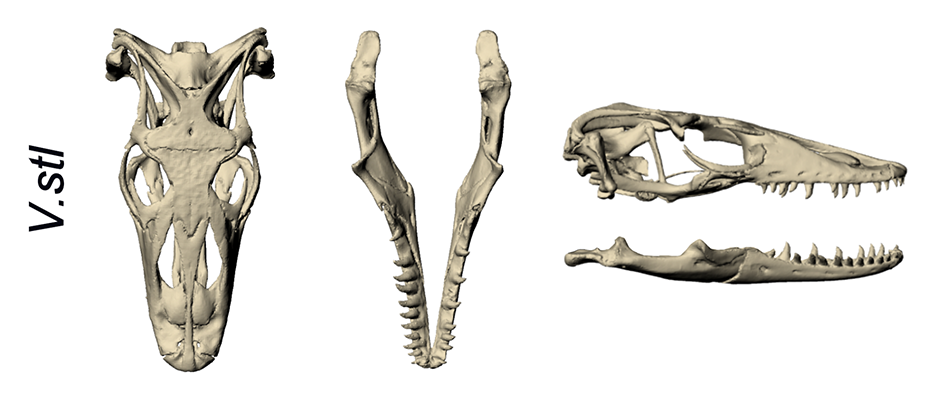
V. salvator skull

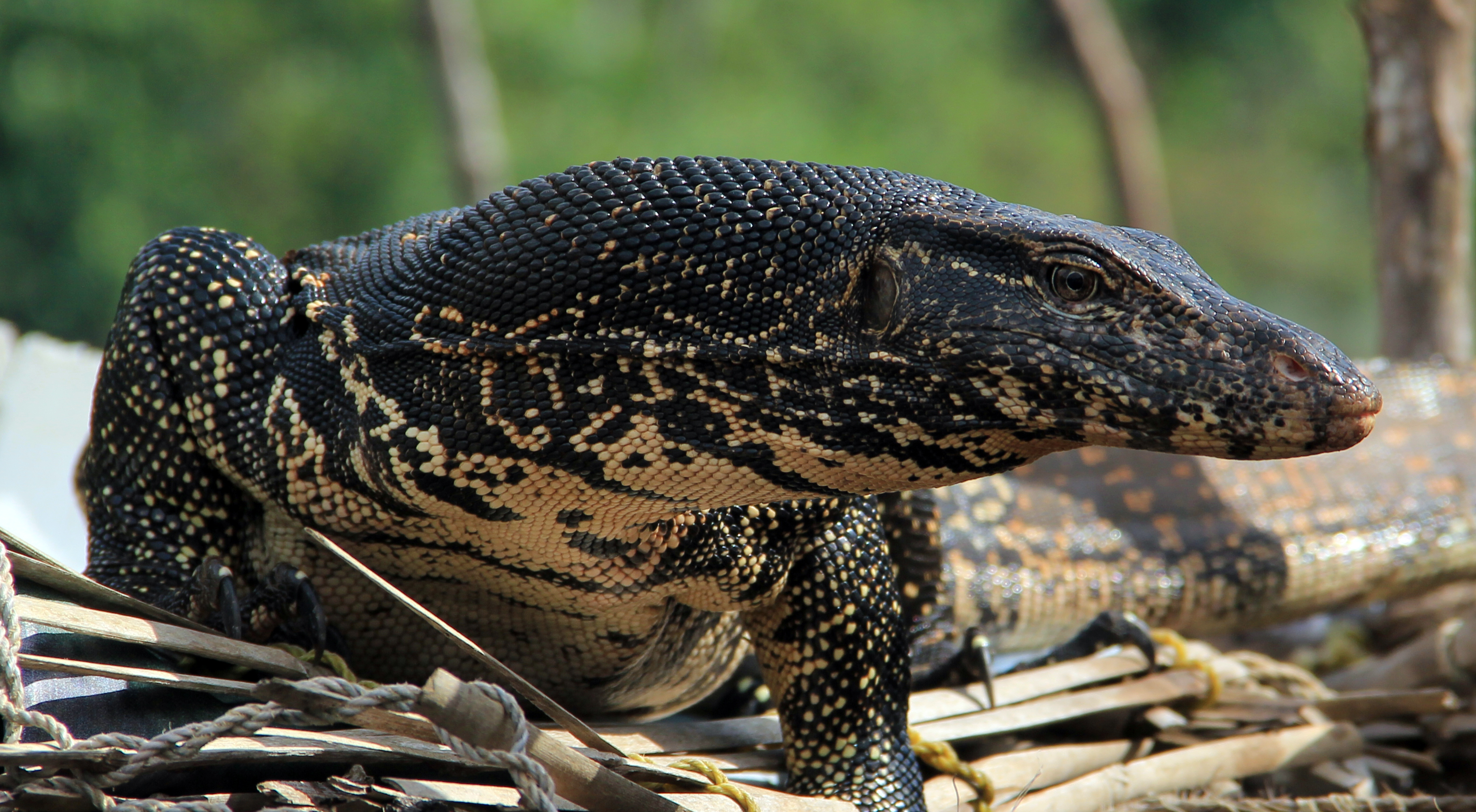
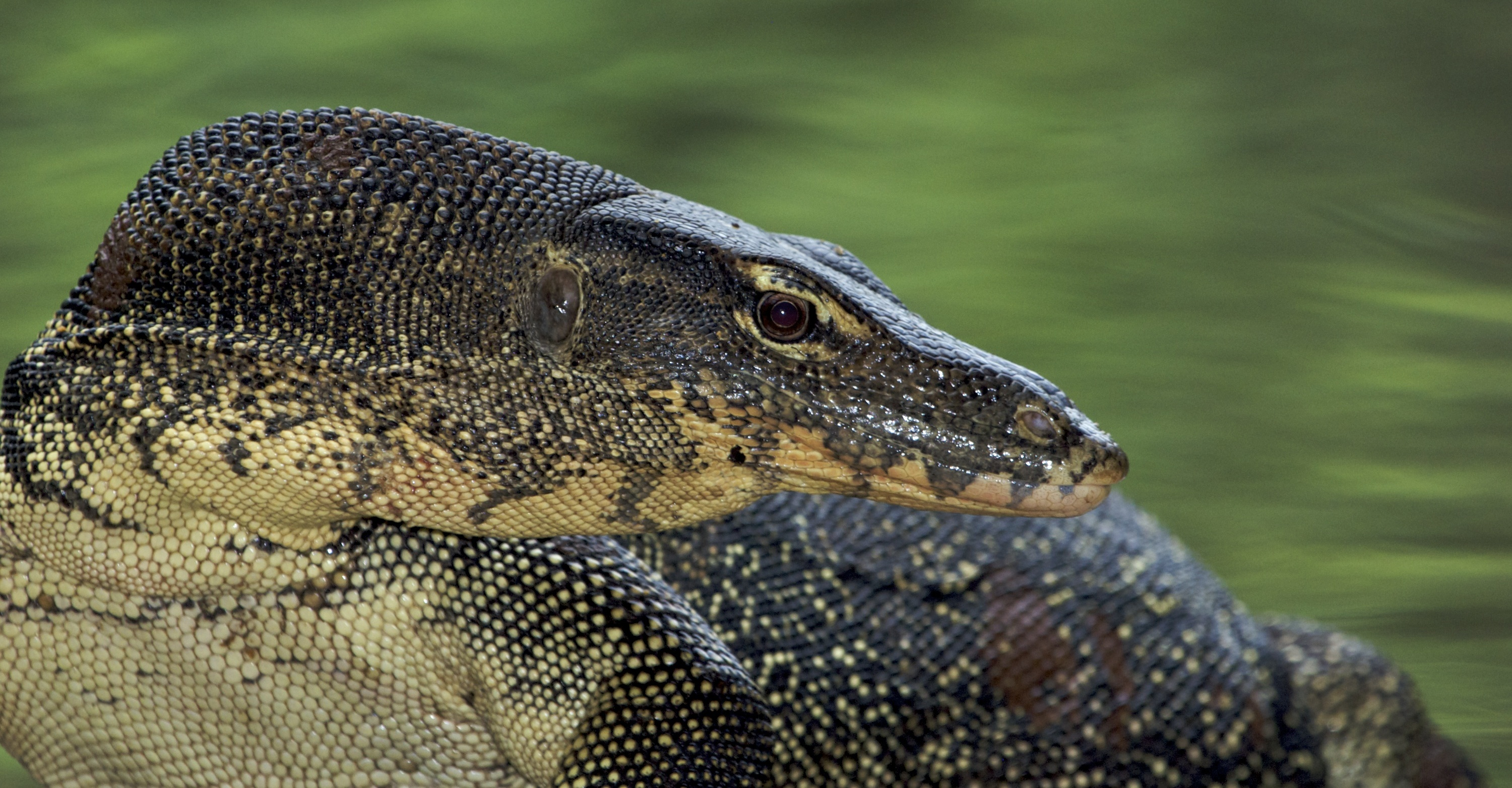
Asian water monitor in Sri Lanka (top), Asian water monitor in Malaysia (bottom)

The possibility of venom in the genus Varanus is widely debated. Previously, venom was thought to be unique to Serpentes (snakes) and Heloderma (venomous lizards). The aftereffects of a Varanus bite were thought to be due to oral bacteria alone, but recent studies have shown venom glands are likely to be present in the mouths of several, if not all, of the species. The venom may be used as a defensive mechanism to fend off predators, to help digest food, to sustain oral hygiene, and possibly to help in capturing and killing prey.

=== Predation ===
Adult water monitors have very few predators; with the exception of human hunters, only saltwater crocodiles (Crocodylus porosus) are known to target them.

=== Attacks on humans ===
In 1999, a seven-year-old boy in Pahang, Malaysia, was bitten in the leg while bathing, requiring 18 stitches.

The monitor was traditionally viewed negatively in Thailand with the lizard's name functioning as a swearword; public perception has become more positive in the 2020s.

== Threats ==
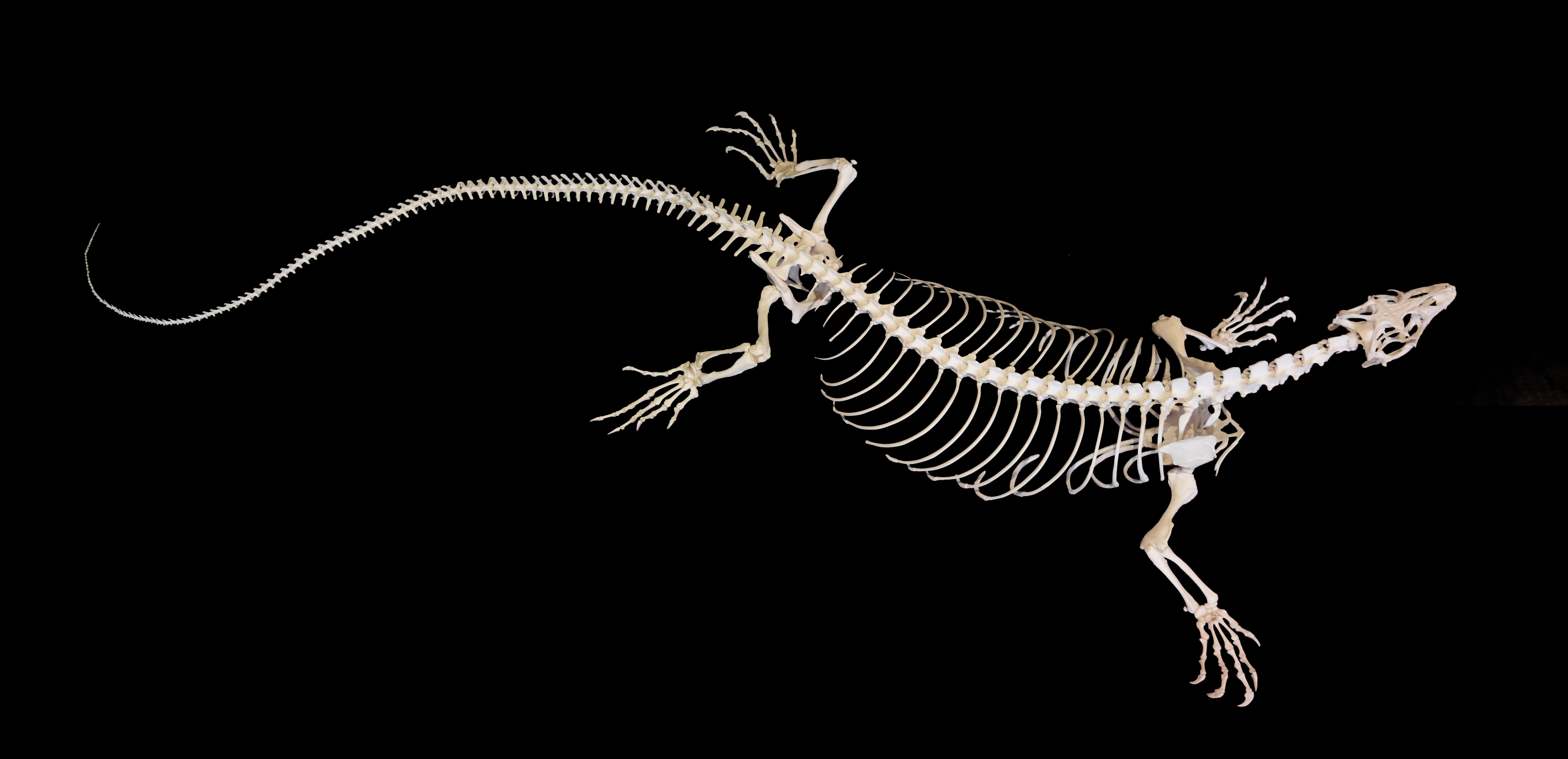
Skeleton

Monitor lizards are traded globally and are the most common type of lizard to be exported from Southeast Asia, with 8.1 million exported between 1998 and 2007 for the international leather market. Today the majority of the harvesting of feral water monitors occurs in Southeast Asia, in Indonesia, and in peninsular Malaysia. Efforts to breed or farm Water monitors in captivity on a commercial scale have not been widely successful. The Asian water monitor is one of the most exploited varanids; its skin is used for fashion accessories such as shoes, belts and handbags which are shipped globally, with as many as 1.5 million skins traded annually and between 50,000 and 120,000 skins harvested from the wild in peninsular Malaysia. Other uses include a perceived remedy for skin ailments and eczema, novelty food in Indonesia, and a perceived aphrodisiac, and as pets. In India, several tribal communities hunt these monitor lizards for their meat, fat and skin and the eggs are also harvested. They are often considered as pests and their populations are also threatened by habitat loss and habitat fragmentation.

== Conservation ==
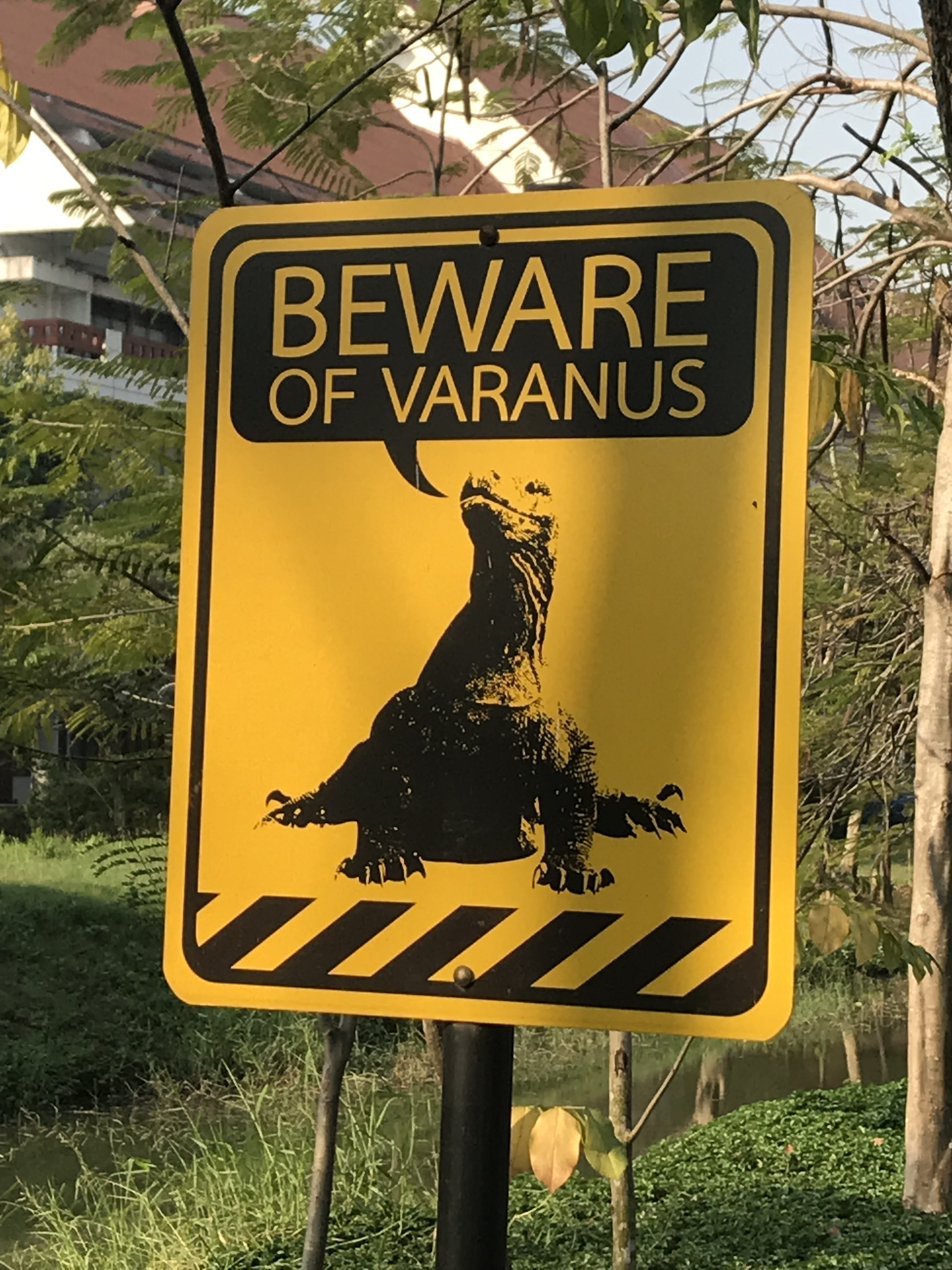
Roadway crossing sign, Thailand

Young V. s. macromaculatus. Video clip

In Nepal, it is a protected species under the Wild Animals Protection Act of 2002. In Hong Kong, it is a protected species under Wild Animals Protection Ordinance Cap 170. In Malaysia, this species is one of the most common wild animals, with numbers comparable to the population of macaques there. Although many fall victim to humans via roadkill and animal cruelty, they still thrive in most states of Malaysia, especially in the shrubs of the east coast states such as Pahang and Terengganu as the regulations in Malaysian states differ based on wildlife management authorities. In Thailand, all monitor lizards are protected species. It is still common in large urban areas in Thailand and is frequently seen in Bangkok's canals and parks. Because of this, it is currently listed as Least Concern in the IUCN Red List. These classifications have been made on the basis that this species maintains a geographically wide distribution, can be found in a variety of habitats, adapts to habitats disturbed by humans, and is abundant in portions of its range despite large levels of harvesting.

Loss of habitat and hunting has exterminated water monitors from most of mainland India. In other areas they survive despite being hunted, due in part to the fact that larger ones, including large females that breed large numbers of eggs, have tough skins that are not desirable.

In Sri Lanka, it is protected by local people who value its predation of "crabs that would otherwise undermine the banks of rice fields". It is also protected as it eats venomous snakes.

The species is listed in Appendix II of the Convention on International Trade in Endangered Species (CITES) meaning international trade (import/export) in specimens (including parts and derivatives) is regulated.
