= Kok Heng Leun =

Singapore artist (born 1966)

- 郭慶亮
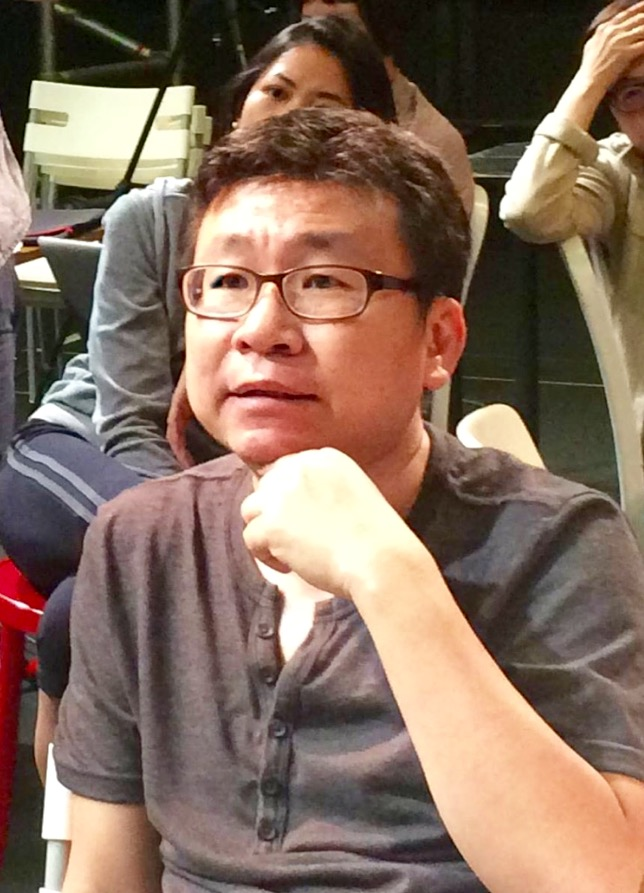
- Kok speaking at an arts discussion in 2015

Artist, Founder of Drama Box Nominated Member of Parliament
- In office 22 March 2016 – 21 September 2018

Personal details
- Born: Kok Heng Leun Singapore
- Education: National University of Singapore
- Occupation: Arts director, politician
- Website: Artist, Founder of Drama Box

Kok Heng Leun (Chinese: 郭慶亮; pinyin: Guō Qìngliàng; born 1966) is a former Singapore Nominated Member of Parliament (NMP) who represented the arts sector in Singapore. He was appointed by the President of Singapore in March 2016. He steps down as Co-Artistic Director of Singaporean theatre company Drama Box in 2022, and continue his practice in the company as an Artist, Founder. He is a member of the Singapore Chinese Cultural Centre Programme Committee, and is part of the arts advisory panel of the National Arts Council, Singapore.

== Background ==
From 1987 to 1990, Kok majored in mathematics at the National University of Singapore. He worked at the Ministry of Community Development as an officer in 1990. In 1991, he worked as a programme executive at The Substation, an independent arts center in Singapore. In 1992, he joined theater company The Necessary Stage as its business manager before becoming a resident director. It was only in 1998 that Kok was appointed as artistic director at Drama Box. Kok had directed more than 80 plays, and is regarded as a practitioner in Singapore's arts sector. He received the Young Artist Award from the National Arts Council in 2000 and the Japanese Chamber of Commerce and Industry Culture Award in 2003. In 2006, he received the Outstanding Young Person (Culture) award.

In 2022, Kok received the Cultural Medallion, Singapore's pinnacle arts award.

In 2024, Kok received the Honorary Doctorate in Education from National University of Tainan.

== Political career ==
In 2014, he made an unsuccessful bid for NMP, and told news agency Channel NewsAsia that "the arts and culture should have a place in the national conversation...and should be brought to the attention of policy makers and to Singaporeans." However, despite his calls to implement change through constructive communication, Kok, after much debate, withdrew his petition in parliament over the controversial Administration of Justice (Protection) Bill that was passed in August 2016. Thereafter, he made a public apology on his own accord.

In April 2016 after Kok was made an NMP, he told The Straits Times that one of his objectives in his term would be to act as a mediator between artists and the authorities; he stated the relationship between both parties had become more problematic in recent times. In May 2016, during his first speech as an NMP in the Singapore Parliament, he "bemoaned the lack of critical thinking among Singaporeans", but did not provide any conceptual or broad solutions to address these inadequacies that he put forth. In a separate incident, he gave his opinion about the change of leadership of Singapore's Arts House stating that its former CEO Lee Chor Lin, who led the organization for three years, should have "stayed at the institution for longer so that the direction of the leadership could have a longer time to take shape and its impact to be felt more deeply”.

In September 2016, Kok developed his own Meet-the-People Sessions in auditoriums and classroom to discuss matters concerning the arts community, and was reported to have used his own funds to do so, although professionally, he was not required to do so in his capacity as an NMP, which functions differently as elected Members of the Singapore Parliament who are obliged to hold such sessions as part of their public service commitments.
