= Jennifer Tham =

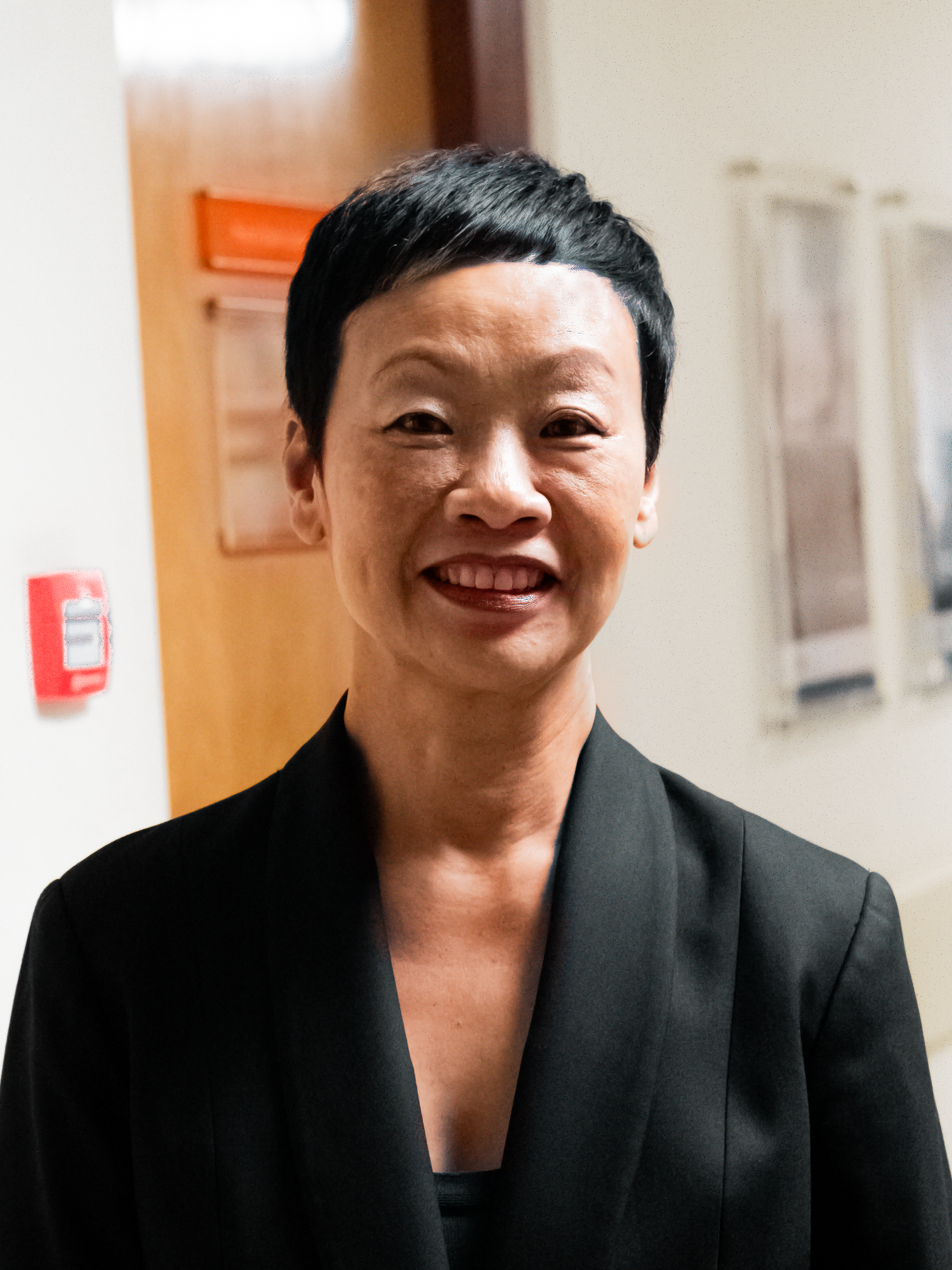
- Jennifer Tham in 2025

Background information
- Occupation(s): choral director, music educator
- Website: www.jennifertham.com

Jennifer Tham (born 1962) is a leading choir conductor and music pedagogue based in Singapore.

== Education ==
She received a Bachelor of Arts in philosophy and sociology from the National University of Singapore in 1985, and trained to be a composer at the Simon Fraser University in Vancouver, British Columbia, Canada, where she graduated with a Bachelor of Fine Arts in music in 1995.

== Career ==
Tham joined the SYC Ensemble Singers in 1981 as a singer and became the artistic director and conductor of the choir since 1986, the artistic director of the Young Musicians' Society since its incorporation as a non-profit arts company in 1996, and is also a conductor with several school choirs at the secondary and junior college levels being the main conductor for school choirs like the Dunman High School Choir and the River Valley High School Choir.

She was conferred the Young Artist Award by the National Arts Council of Singapore in 1992, and was a recipient of the Cultural Medallion in 2012.
