= Daryl Qilin Yam =

Singaporean writer (born 1991)

- Born: 1991 (age 34–35)
- Occupations: Writer and editor
- Writing career
- Language: English
- Notable awards: Singapore Young Artist Award; 2025

Daryl Qilin Yam (Chinese: 阮麒霖; pinyin: Ruán Qí Lín, born 1991) is a Singaporean writer, editor and arts organiser, notable for the transnational themes in his fiction.

He is a co-founder of the literary organisation Sing Lit Station and also serves as the managing editor of the non-profit poetry press, Afterimage.

== Early life and education ==
As a child, Yam was an avid reader of the novels of Enid Blyton, as well as fantasy series such as Harry Potter, Artemis Fowl, His Dark Materials and the Bartimaeus Sequence. In his teenage years, he was influenced by Hermann Hesse's Siddhartha, as well as the works of Margaret Atwood, Haruki Murakami, Michael Cunningham and David Mitchell.

He began writing at the age of 17, and chose to take the craft more seriously from the age of 20, going on to pursue a bachelors degree in English Literature and Creative Writing at the University of Warwick and a master's degree in English with a specialisation in creative writing at Nanyang Technological University.

== Career ==
Yam conceived his first novel, Kappa Quartet, while taking a shower. It begins with the meeting of a Singaporean and a kappa in Tokyo, and takes the form of eight interconnected stories, each narrated from a different perspective. In a Quarterly Literary Review Singapore review, the work was situated within Singaporean literature as a refreshing departure from heavily realist, sociopolitical tradition, and that by blending fantasy, metafiction, and existential inquiry, it pushes the boundary of what Singaporean novel can be. It was described by The Business Times as one of the best new books of 2016.

In 2016, Yam co-founded the literary organisation Sing Lit Station with fellow authors Joshua Ip and Jon Gresham.

His novella Shantih Shantih Shantih, published in 2021, describes a freak episode of snowfall in Singapore, witnessed by twelve individuals. The stories could be read out of order, and was compared to Jim Jarmusch’s Night on Earth film and TS Eliot’s “The Waste Land” poem.

His second novel, Lovelier, Lonelier, published in 2024, follows the lives of four friends following the passing of the Comet Hyakutake in 1996. The usage of story within a story literary device as well as the non-existent usage of quotation marks for conversation of the embedded book were noted as "genre-defying stylistic choices". It was longlisted for the 2023 Dublin Literary Award.

In 2024, Sing Lit Station launched Afterimage, a non-profit publishing press that is focused on poetry and Yam has been serving as its managing editor.

== Personal life ==
He identifies as a queer writer.

== Bibliography ==
=== Novels ===
- Kappa Quartet. Epigram Books. 2016. ISBN 978-981-4757-75-1.
- Lovelier, Lonelier. Epigram Books. 2021. ISBN 981-4901-37-7.

=== Novellas ===
- Shantih Shantih Shantih (2nd ed.). Epigram Books. 2025. ISBN 978-981-4845-30-4. First published in 2021.

=== Short story collections ===
- Be Your Own Bae. Epigram Books. 2024. ISBN 978-981-5105-34-6.

== Awards ==
- Singapore Young Artist Award (2025)
