= Yeoh Siew Lian =

Singaporean soprano (1941–1987)

Yeoh Siew Lian (1941–1987), also known as Oon Siew Lian, was a Singaporean soprano.

== Early life and education ==
Yeoh was born in Singapore in 1941. She received her education in Malacca. She then left Malacca to study ballet at the London College of Dance and Drama.

== Career ==
After graduating from college, she returned to Malacca to open a ballet school. After her marriage, she moved back to Singapore in the mid-1960s. She then worked under singers Yvette Anwar, Choo Hwee Lim, and Huang Phay Ching, and obtained her Licentiate of the Royal Academy of Music, a performing and teaching diploma and a diploma in solo singing.

Yeoh held her first major concert in February 1974. In 1975, she formed the Four Voices vocal quartet with David Lim Kim San, Shirley Fleury, and Geoffrey Abisheganaden. In a positive review of a Four Voices recital held in March 1977, Violet Oon of The Straits Times wrote that Yeoh "possesses the sweetly brilliant voice of a lyrical soprano". In a negative review of a Four Voices recital held in March 1978, Oon wrote that Yeoh was "the only one who showed artistic development", and that while she was "not endowed with an outstanding natural voice", she had "more than made up for this by the attention paid to detail, technique and interpretation."

Yeoh was a voice tutor at the National University of Singapore. She also gave private voice lessons, and Mark Chan and Chris Ho were among her students.

== Personal life and death ==
Yeoh married Oon Chong Lin, a radiologist. In 1977, they collaborated on a song for a national songwriting contest.

Yeoh died of cancer in 1987. A $5000 Best Vocalist Award was introduced for the 7th National Music Competition in honour of her.
