= Siow Lee Chin =

Singaporean violinist (born 1966)

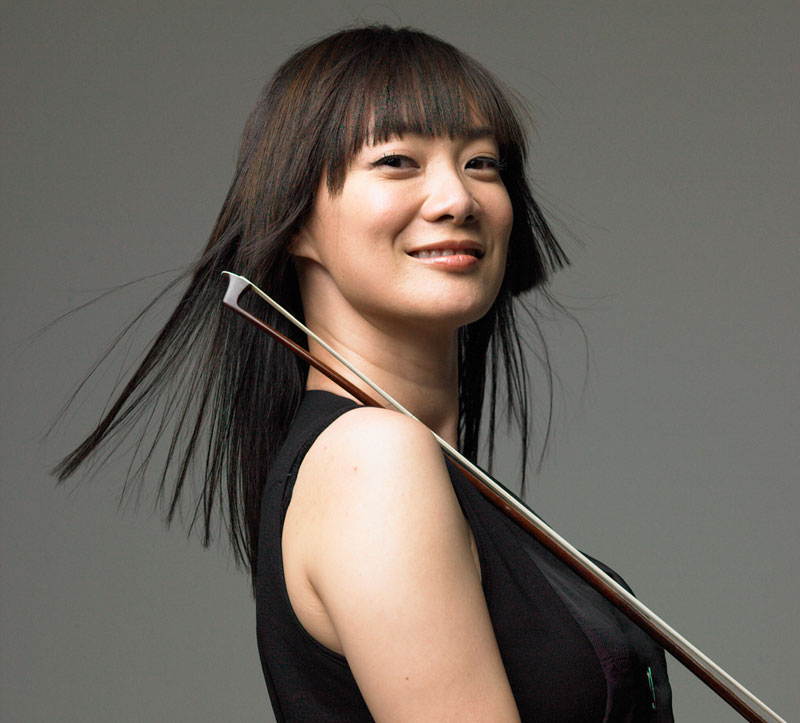
- Photo by Kenneth Wong

Background information
- Origin: Singapore
- Genre: Classical
- Occupation: Soloist
- Instrument: Violin
- Website: www.leechin.com

Siow Lee Chin (traditional Chinese: 蕭麗君; simplified Chinese: 萧丽君; born 1966) is a Singaporean violinist.

Featured in the American Record Guide as "a distinguished cultural asset of international stature", and The Strad as a "trailblazing role model for string players", Siow's Gold Medal victory at the 1994 Henryk Szeryng International Violin Competition launched her career as one of Singapore's first soloists on the international classical stage. Her performances been viewed on China Central TV, America's CBS, National Public Radio, and Singapore's MediaCorp.

As soloist, Siow has collaborated with orchestras such as the Royal Philharmonic Orchestra, Ludwigsburg Festival Orchestra, Houston Symphony, Dallas Symphony, the Malaysian Philharmonic Orchestra, National Philharmonic of Ukraine, National Symphony Orchestra of Chile, Mexico State Symphony Orchestra, Avignon Symphony Orchestra, Auckland Philharmonia; as well as at major concert halls and festivals in Asia, Europe and the Americas including the Royal Albert Hall, Osaka Symphony Hall, Carnegie Weill Recital Hall, Alice Tully Hall at Lincoln Center, Beijing Concert Hall, City Hall in Hong Kong, Esplanade Concert Hall, Hangzhou Grand Theatre, KonzertHaus Vienna, Petronas Concert Hall, Shanghai Oriental Arts Centre, Suzhou Arts and Cultural Center, Tchaikovsky Hall; the Aspen Music Festival, Banff Music Festival, Cervantino Music Festival, Kansai International Performing Arts Festival, Lucerne International Music Festival, Ludwigsburg International Music Festival, Music Fest Perugia and Singapore Arts Festival. She performed centerstage at the 2015 Southeast Asian Games Opening Ceremony in the 55,000 capacity National Stadium, Singapore.

Beginning her violin studies with her late father Siow Hee Shun, Siow Lee Chin traces her musical lineage all the way back to Eugène Ysaÿe, Henri Vieuxtemps and Henryk Wieniawski through their disciples and her teachers at Curtis Institute of Music, Oberlin College and Mannes: Aaron Rosand, Jascha Brodsky, Felix Galimir, Roland and Almita Vamos. Today, she continues their pedagogical tradition in her work with young people in music institutions including Beijing's Central Conservatory of Music, Seoul National University, Chicago Institute of Music, Lisbon Academy of Music, the Singapore National Youth Orchestra and as violin professor at the College of Charleston. She personalises familiar favourites with Asian motifs and introduces the music of Asian composers to the West. At the 2015 City of London Festival, she performed the world premiere of "Air", a piece written for her by Chinese composer Yao Chen, in a recital program which showcased the evolution of violin virtuosity from J.S. Bach to the present.

Siow's CD Songs My Father Taught Me was a HMV classical bestseller in 2009 and was picked for Fanfare Magazine's Want List. In 2015, Singapore Press Holdings published her memoirs From Clementi to Carnegie – The Journey of Singaporean Violinist Siow Lee Chin.

== Awards and career highlights ==
- Recipient of the Meritorious Award presented by the Composers and Authors Society of Singapore (COMPASS) for outstanding achievements and contributions to the development of music in Singapore, 2015
- Awarded Fellowship in Music Performance in recognition of artistic excellence, South Carolina Arts Commission, 2012
- Faculty of the Year Award (School of the Arts), College of Charleston, 2010
- Soloist in concert to celebrate 20th anniversary of China Singapore diplomatic relations, 2010
- Co-founded Charleston Music Fest, 2006
- Soloist with Singapore Symphony Orchestra's debut tour of Japan, 2003
- First recipient of the 1750 J.B.Guadagnini under the National Arts Council's Violin Loan Scheme, 2000
- Singled out by the Prime Minister of Singapore as one of the most inspiring Singaporeans who has made her mark in the arts world, 1999
- Royal Albert Hall debut with the Royal Philharmonic Orchestra, London, 1997
- Winner of the Young Artist Award presented by the Singapore National Arts Council, 1996
- Second Prize Winner, Ima Hogg Houston Symphony Competition, Texas, USA, 1995
- Gold Medal Winner, Henryk Szeryng International Competition, Mexico, 1994
- Gold Medal Winner, Louise D. McMahon International Music Competition, Oklahoma, USA, 1994
- Winner of the Singapore Youth Award for Excellence in the Arts presented by the Prime Minister of Singapore, 1994
- Winner of the 18th annual Young Artists Violin Award, Artists International Competition, New York, USA, 1990

== Selected appearances - Soloist with orchestras ==
- Avignon Symphony Orchestra France
- Auckland Philharmonia New Zealand
- Bangor Symphony Orchestra USA
- Bellevue Philharmonic Orchestra USA
- Billings Symphony Orchestra USA
- Boise Symphony Orchestra USA
- Charleston Symphony Orchestra USA
- Champaign-Urbana Symphony Orchestra USA
- China Radio-Film Symphony Orchestra China
- Curtis Symphony Orchestra USA
- Dallas Symphony Orchestra USA
- Erfurt Philharmonic Orchestra Germany
- Enid Symphony Orchestra USA
- Houston Symphony Orchestra USA
- Jena Philharmonic Orchestra Germany
- Jupiter Symphony Orchestra USA
- Lawton Philharmonic Orchestra USA
- Lviv Philharmonic Orchestra Ukraine
- Lisbon Metropolitan Orchestra Portugal
- Ludwisburger Festival Orchestra Germany
- Malaysian Philharmonic Orchestra Singapore
- National Philharmonic of Ukraine Ukraine
- Northwest Florida Orchestra USA
- Oberlin Orchestra USA, China (Beijing, Shanghai, Hangzhou, Wuhan, Chongqing), Singapore
- Ohio Chamber Orchestra USA
- Orquesta Sinfonica de Chile Chile
- Rockford Symphony Orchestra USA
- Royal Philharmonic Orchestra UK & Malaysia
- Singapore Symphony Orchestra Singapore & Japan
- South Carolina Philharmonic USA
- State Symphony Orchestra of Mexico Mexico
- Syracuse Symphony Orchestra USA
- Vienna United Philharmonic Austria
- Virtuosi Symphony Orchestra Brazil
- Wichita Falls Symphony USA
- Wuhan Philharmonic Orchestra China

== Selected Masterclasses Conducted ==
- Oberlin Conservatory of Music
- Beijing Conservatory of Music
- Seoul National University
- Wuhan Conservatory of Music
- Taiwan National Chiau Tung University Institute of Music
- Chicago Institute of Music
- Lisbon Academy of Music
- Ohio University
- University of Maryland
- University of Chile
- University of Guanajuto, Mexico
- University of Nevada, Las Vegas
- Kiev State Music Academy, Ukraine
- Lviv State Music Academy and School for Gifted Children, Ukraine
- National University of Singapore, Yong Siew Toh Conservatory
- Singapore National Youth Orchestra
- Raffles Institution
- Ball State University
- University of Milwaukee
- University of North Florida
- Lawrence University, Appleton
- University of Montana
- Levine School of Music, Washington D.C.
- Governor's School for the Arts and Humanities, South Carolina
- Youth Orchestra of the Lowcountry, South Carolina
- Fine Arts Institute, South Carolina
- Weathersfield Music Festival
- Chamber Music Festival of Milwaukee
- VIRTUOSI Festival, Brazil
- Music Fest Perugia, Italy
