= Chng Nai Wee =

Singaporean surgeon and artist

- Born: 1969 (age 56–57); Singapore
- Education: MB BCh BAO, LRCP&SI (Royal College of Surgeons in Ireland, 1993); MMed (National University of Singapore, 1999)
- Known for: Sculpture, video art, installation art, video installation, new media art, mixed media
- Movement: Contemporary art
- Awards: 1995: Dr Tan Tsze Chor Art Award, Singapore; 1999: National Arts Council Young Artist Award, Singapore
- Website: http://biotechnics.org/ http://www.singaporeart.org/

Chng Nai Wee (Chinese: 庄乃维; pinyin: Zhuāng Nǎiwéi, b. 1969) is an ophthalmology surgeon and artist in Singapore.

As an artist active in the 1990s to the early 2000s, Chng's art practice spans sculpture, installation art, and video art, drawing inspiration from his backgrounds in biomedical sciences, design, and information technology. In 1999, Chng received the Young Artist Award, the most prestigious recognition for artists below 35 from the National Arts Council, Singapore.

As an eye surgeon, Chng's clinical interests are in cataract and LASIK surgery. He is a practicing ophthalmology surgeon at the Eagle Eye Centre in Singapore.

== Early life and education ==
Chng was born in 1969 in Singapore. He was a student at Anglo-Chinese School from 1976 to 1985, after which he attended Hwa Chong Junior College from 1985 to 1986. He trained in Western painting through part-time enrolment at the Nanyang Academy of Fine Arts from 1986 to 1987.

In 1988, he enrolled at the Royal College of Surgeons in Ireland, graduating in 1993 with Honors in Medicine and Surgery. In 1999, he pursued and was awarded his Master of Medicine in Ophthalmology at the National University of Singapore.

He has separately taken graduate student classes at the Yale University School of Architecture in 1999, 2004 and 2014, studying topics such as architecture and urbanism.

== Artistic career ==
Chng’s work was included in the Sculpture in Singapore exhibition at the National Museum Art Gallery in 1991, alongside artists such as Tang Da Wu, Ng Eng Teng and Han Sai Por. Chng showed Sin of Apathy, an installation featuring 12 videos of people pleading for help. The work is an early example of video installation art in Singapore and Southeast Asia. It may also be seen as being part of a larger shift in Singapore towards socially engaged art, which has most often been discussed with respect to The Artists Village.

On 31 Dec of the same year, he opened his first solo exhibition, also at the National Museum Art Gallery. Titled New Works, it presented 26 works in a variety of media, ranging from painting to sculpture and video. The exhibition listing described it as “neo-cubistic sculptures; works founded on electronic circuitry and the organic world of microbiology; and video technology.” His second solo exhibition at SweeGuan Gallery presented 35 works, including an origami sculpture made from photographs, which joined other paintings and sculptures. Having worked as a medical doctor for several years, Chng’s art practice had now focussed on biology and histology.

From 1997, Chng started collating material for an online art resource archiving materials about the Singapore art community, which would be launched on its present domain name, SingaporeArt.org, in 2002.

In 1998, Chng held a solo exhibition at The Substation titled Biotechnics, which looked at medical science and technology and provided early commentary on the development of Artificial Intelligence. He subsequently received the Young Artist Award, the most prestigious recognition for artists below 35, from the National Arts Council in 1999.

His public works include Panthenon - Innards of Consciousness (Biopolis, Singapore 2003) and Techgenesis (National Arts Council lobby, 1999), a fusion of the innards of computer circuitry and raw construction materials. His works are in the collection of the Singapore Art Museum.

In 2023, Chng's Sin of Apathy (1991) was re-staged at the National Gallery Singapore exhibition, See Me, See You: Early Video Installation of Southeast Asia. Here, the work as shown with other early examples of video installation artworks made in the 1980s and 1990s in Southeast Asia.

== Selected exhibitions ==
1991	Second National Sculpture Exhibition: Sculpture in Singapore, National Museum Art Gallery Singapore
1992	(solo) New Works, National Museum Art Gallery Singapore
1998	(solo) Biotechnics, The Substation, Singapore
1999	Provocative Things, Sculpture Square, Singapore
1999	Ophthalmogenesis in Nokia Singapore Art: City/ Community, Singapore Art Museum, Singapore
2001	The Spirituality of Perception in Nokia Singapore Art: Histories, Identities, Technologies, Spaces, Singapore Art Museum, Singapore
2002	(solo) Moleculux - Luminescent Bodies in Hyperspace; Sculpture Square; Singapore
2002	Like or Not?, Esplanade Visual Arts Opening Festival, Esplanade, Singapore
2017	Juxtaposition, iPreciation Gallery, Singapore
2023	See Me, See You, National Gallery Singapore
