= Zhang Fuming =

Singaporean printmaker

Zhang Fuming (張富銘)
- Born: 1989 (age 36–37); Singapore
- Known for: Woodcut Printmaking

Zhang Fuming (張富銘; born 1989) is a Singaporean artist and printmaker who focuses on woodcut printmaking that incorporates traditional techniques and contemporary subject matter. His works often explore social commentary and realism, focusing on the materiality and texture of woodblocks beyond conventional paper prints.

== Education ==
Zhang graduated with a Diploma in Fine Arts from LASALLE College of the Arts in 2011.

== Career ==
Zhang's practice centers on themes of ambition, societal expectations, and identity. Using woodcut techniques, he examines personal aspirations in the context of societal pressures. His works often reference motifs, such as the rice bowl, to explore materiality and cultural symbolism. Through stark contrasts and dynamic textures, Zhang's prints emphasize resilience and reflect the complexities of contemporary society.

In 2022, he founded Drawing Etc. Art Supplies, an artist-run store on Arab Street, Singapore, which includes a gallery and workshop space to support the local art community.

== Awards ==
Zhang was awarded the Young Talent Programme 2014/15, which played a key role in supporting his early development as a printmaker.

In 2024, Zhang was conferred the National Arts Council Singapore Young Artist Award, Singapore’s highest accolade for artists aged 35 and below.
