= Yanyun Chen =

Singaporean artist

Yanyun Chen (Chinese: 陈彦云; pinyin: Chén Yànyún; born 1986) is a Singaporean artist who works with charcoal drawings, animation and installation. Her works feature intergenerational family stories and cultural wounds, which explore tenuous relationships with traditions and scars that live in language.

== Education ==
Chen was born in Singapore. She attended Nanyang Technological University and received a BFA in Digital Animation in 2009. Following that, she completed a MA in Communications in 2012 and Phd in Philosophy, Art and Critical Theory in 2018 at European Graduate School in Switzerland.

== Career ==
Chen taught at Yale-NUS College from 2015 to 2022. At the College, she received the Georgette Chen Fellowship in 2020. In 2021, she received the Andreas Teoh Contemporary Asian Art Program Fellowship. She held the role of Professor of the Practice at the School of the Museum of Fine Art, Tufts University, in Boston, USA since 2023.

== Works ==
=== The scars that write us ===
Commissioned by Singapore Art Museum for the President's Young Talent 2018,The scars that write us is a series of scar portraits welded and drawn on mild steel. Awarded the People's Choice Award, the exhibition offers a narrative on wounds and scars, and those that bear them. In an interview with art writer Ian Tee, Chen speaks of "the scars that live in language", texturing the physical-psychological wounds on skin with trauma inflicted by a welding gun.

=== Stories of a Woman and her Dowry ===
Stories of a Woman and Her Dowry was the first solo exhibition at Grey Projects in 2019. It was next exhibited as a group show with visual artist Kanchana Guptain at Objectifs Centre for Photography and Film in 2022. Curator Kimberley Shen describes their works "navigate the precarities of the cultural tropes and expectations of Asian women, in a palpable reclamation of tenderness and strength embedded in the feminine narrative and identity". Chen shares that stories derived from intergenerational trauma can just as much be an intergenerational gift.

== Awards ==
Chen was awarded the Art Outreach IMPART Award in 2019. She was awarded Best Art Direction at National Youth Film Awards for stop-motion short film Automatonomy, directed by Mark Wee and Jerrold Chong of Finding Pictures.

In 2020, Chen was awarded the National Arts Council Singapore Young Artist Award, Singapore's highest award for young arts practitioners, aged 35 and below.
