= Singapore Young Artist Award =

Annual art award in Singapore

The Young Artist Award is a cultural award in Singapore conferred to those who have achieved artistic excellence in film, literature, performing arts and visual arts. It is the highest accolade for art practitioners aged 35 and below.

== History ==
Introduced in 1992, the award is presented by the Minister for Culture, Community and Youth and administered by the National Arts Council. It comes with a grant of S$20,000 in support of their artistic pursuits. From 2013, recipients of the Cultural Medallion and Young Artist Award will no longer be categorised according to art forms.

== List of Young Artist Award recipients ==
Year	Category	Name	Ref
1992	Dance	Jamaludin Jalil	
1992	Literary Arts	Liang Wern Fook	
1992	Music	Jennifer Tham	
1992	Music	Shane Thio	
1992	Photography	Lee Tiah Khee	
1992	Theatre	Lim Jen Erh	
1992	Theatre	Ong Keng Sen	
1992	Visual Arts	S. Chandrasekaran	
1993	Dance	Osman Bin Abdul Hamid	
1993	Literary Arts	Chia Joo Ming	
1993	Literary Arts	Philip Anthony Jeyaretnam	
1993	Music	Ng Seng Hong	
1993	Photography	Bey Hua Heng	
1993	Theatre	Lut Ali	
1993	Theatre	William Teo Kah Kheng	
1993	Visual Arts	Henri Chen KeZhan	
1995	Dance	Mohamed Noor Bin Sarman	
1995	Dance	Nirmala Seshadri	
1995	Literary Arts	Simon Tay Seong Chee	
1995	Music	Ghanavenothan Retnam	
1995	Photography	Lim Seng Tiong	
1995	Visual Arts	Baet Yeok Kuan	
1996	Dance	Meenakshy Bhaskar	
1996	Literary Arts	Boey Kim Cheng	
1996	Literary Arts	Ovidia Yu	
1996	Music	Siow Lee Chin	
1996	Theatre	Ivan Heng	
1997	Dance	Ker Ban Hing	
1997	Film	Eric Khoo Kim Hai	
1997	Literary Arts	Tan Mei Ching	
1997	Music	Lim Jing Jing	
1997	Theatre	Haresh Sharma	
1997	Visual Arts	Lim Poh Teck	
1998	Dance	Paul C. Ocampo	
1998	Dance	Thamizhvanan Narayanasamy Veshnu	
1998	Literary Arts	Gabriel Wu Yeow Chong	
1998	Music	Joyce Koh Bee Tuan	
1998	Music	Lee Huei Min	
1998	Theatre	Alvin Tan	
1999	Literary Arts	Henry Low Swee Kim	
1999	Music	Aravinth Kumarasamy	
1999	Music	Chua Lik Wuk	
1999	Theatre	Ang Gey Pin	
1999	Visual Arts	Chng Nai Wee	
2000	Dance	Jeffrey Tan Joo Kuan	
2000	Dance	Lim Chin Huat	
2000	Literary Arts	Felix Cheong Seng Fei	
2000	Music	Kam Ning	
2000	Theatre	Kok Heng Leun	
2000	Theatre	Lee Sze Yau	
2000	Visual Arts	Hong Sek Chern	
2001	Film	Cheah Chee Kong	
2001	Literary Arts	Alfian Bin Sa'at	
2001	Music	Yee Ee-Ping	
2001	Theatre	Goh Boon Teck	
2001	Visual Arts	Chua Say Hua	
2001	Visual Arts	Raymond Lau Poo Seng	
2002	Dance	Tammy Ling Wong	
2002	Film	Royston Tan Tsze Kiam	
2002	Literary Arts	Daren Shiau Vee Lung	
2002	Music	Quek Ling Kiong	
2002	Visual Arts	Tay Bak Chiang	
2003	Literary Arts	Tan Hwee Hwee	
2003	Music	Zechariah Goh Toh Chai	
2003	Photography	Ken Seet Thiam Wui	
2003	Visual Arts	Noni Kaur	
2004	Dance	Danny Tan Koon Meng	
2004	Literary Arts	Tan Chee Lay	
2004	Music	Chan Yoong Han	
2004	Music	Ling Hock Siang	
2004	Visual Arts	Tang Ling Nah	
2005	Dance	Aaron Khek Ah Hock	
2005	Literary Arts	Alvin Pang Khee Meng	
2005	Literary Arts	Cyril Wong Yit Mun	
2005	Music	Katryna Tan Huey Wern	
2005	Theatre	Li Xie (Lim Poh Poh)	
2005	Visual Arts	Heman Chong	
2005	Visual Arts	Michael Lee Hong Hwee	
2006	Film	Kelvin Tong	
2006	Music	Lim Yan	
2006	Music	Toh Ban Sheng	
2006	Theatre	Beatrice Chia-Richmond	
2006	Theatre	Chong Tze Chien	
2006	Theatre	Yo Shao Ann	
2006	Visual Arts	Francis Ng Teck Yong	
2006	Visual Arts	Yeo Chee Kiong	
2007	Dance	Kuik Swee Boon	
2007	Literary Arts	Ting Kheng Siong	
2007	Music	Philip Tan Chin Wen	
2007	Theatre	Natalie Hennedige	
2007	Visual Arts	Tan Kai Syng	
2008	Dance	Daniel Kok Yik Leng	
2008	Dance	Xia Haiying	
2008	Theatre	Aidli Mosbit	
2008	Theatre	Cai Bi Xia	
2008	Visual Arts	Jason Wee	
2009	Film	Anthony Chen Zheyi	
2009	Film	Boo Junfeng	
2009	Film	Han Yew Kwang	
2009	Visual Arts	Donna Ong	
2009	Visual Arts	Ho Tzu Nyen	
2010	Film	Sun Koh	
2010	Literary Arts	Sonny Liew	
2010	Literary Arts	Toh Hsien Min	
2010	Visual Arts	Choy Ka Fai	
2010	Visual Arts	Robert Zhao Renhui	
2011	Literary Arts	Troy Chin Chien Wen	
2011	Music	Joshua Tan Kang Ming	
2011	Music	Nawaz Mirajkar	
2011	Theatre	Lim Woan Wen	
2011	Theatre	Peter Sau Jia Liang	
2011	Visual Arts	Ang Song Ming	
2012	Dance	Zhuo Zihao	
2012	Film	Liao Jiekai	
2012	Film	Looi Wan Ping (Lei Yuan Bin)	
2012	Literary Arts	O Thiam Chin	
2012	Music	Darren Ng Tzer Huei	
2012	Theatre	Brian Gothong Tan	
2012	Theatre	Zizi Azah Bte Abdul Majid	
2012	Visual Arts	Genevieve Chua	
2012	Visual Arts	Tan Wee Lit	
2013		Bani Haykal	
2013		Chua Yew Kok	
2013		Grace Tan	
2013		Koh Hui Ling	
2013		M. Zaki Razak	
2013		Ruth Ling	
2013		Zul Othman (ZERO)	
2014		Chen Zhangyi	
2014		Ian Loy	
2014		Jow Zhi Wei	
2014		Lee Mun Wai	
2014		Siti Khalijah Zainal	
2015		Chun Kai Feng	
2015		Chun Kai Qun	
2015		Diana Soh	
2015		James Tan	
2015		Kirsten Tan	
2015		Loo Zihan	
2015		Riduan Zalani	
2016		Alecia Neo	
2016		Ezzam Rahman	
2016		Liu Xiaoyi	
2016		Marc Nair	
2016		Pooja Nansi	
2017		Joshua Ip	
2017		Kahchun Wong	
2017		Kray Chen	
2017		Yarra Ileto	
2018		Sufri Juwahir	
2018		Lim Ting Li	
2018		Zulkifli Mohamed Amin	
2018		Faith Ng	
2018		Hilmi Johandi	
2019		Emily Koh	
2019		Gabriel Chan	
2019		He Shuming	
2019		Tan Wei Keong	
2019		Weixin Quek Chong	
2020		Irfan Kasban	
2020		Nicole Midori Woodford	
2020		Sushma Soma	
2020		Yanyun Chen	
2021		Charlie Lim	
2021		Chitra Poornima Sathish	
2021		Han Xuemei	
2021		Norhaizad Adam	
2021		Yeo Siew Hua	
2021		Zen Teh Shi Wei	
2022		Guo Ningru	
2022		Ho Rui An	
2022		Jerrold Chong	
2022		Rit Xu	
2023		Daryl Lim Wei Jie	
2023		Julian Wong	
2023		Melissa Tan	
2023		Shyan Tan	
2023		Wang Chenwei	
2024		Evan Low Jun Feng	
2024		Tan Si En	
2024		Alan Choo Su Ho	
2024		Zhang Fuming	
2025		Alvin Lee Chang Rong	
2025		He Yingshu	
2025		Genevieve Peck Jing Yi	
2025		Syafiqah 'Adha Sallehin	
2025		Daryl Qilin Yam	
