= SYC Ensemble Singers =

- Origin: Singapore
- Years active: 1964–present
- Website: www.syc.org.sg

The Singapore Youth Choir (SYC) Ensemble Singers (previously known as the Singapore Youth Choir) is a distinguished choral group in Singapore formed in 1964.

The SYC Ensemble Singers' Artistic Director is Jennifer Tham, a leading choral pedagogue in Singapore.

== History ==
The Singapore Youth Choir (SYC) was formed in 1964, and was first named the Combined Schools Choir. It was set up by Benjamin Khoo, a Senior Specialist Inspector with the Ministry of Education, and David Lim, who was then a visiting music teacher working under Khoo's guidance. The choir was first conducted by Khoo from 1964 to 1970, and later by Lim from 1970 to 1989. The choir was also conducted by Lim Yau from 1982 to 1983, and has been conducted by Jennifer Tham, previously a choral instructor with few secondary schools and junior colleges in Singapore, since 1989. In 2004, coinciding with its 40th anniversary, the choir was renamed the SYC Ensemble Singers.

The SYC Ensemble Singers celebrated their 60th anniversary with a concert "SYC & Friends: 60 Years Young" performing Arvo Pärt's "Te Deum", Eric Whitacre's "The Stolen Child", and Cristian Grases’ new setting of “Lux Aeterna” amongst music by Singaporeans Leong Yoon Pin, Joyce Bee Tuan Koh and Diana Soh.

=== Work in Singapore ===
In 1997, the SYC was a recipient of the President's Charity Award (for service to the State and community). In 2000, the SYC was the recording choir for the re-orchestration of the national anthem, Majulah Singapura, arranged by Phoon Yew Tien. In the same year, it was presented the Excellence for Singapore Award by the Singapore Totalisator Board. Additionally, the SYC has also been the recording choir for Singapore's national day parades, first in 1989 and 2007.

=== Participation in international festivals and competitions ===
In 1972, the SYC was the first Singaporean choir to participate in an overseas competition, the Tees-side International Eisteddfod in Middlesbrough, England. Notably, in 1974, it also became the first Singaporean choir to win at the Llangollen Eisteddfod, with a first-placing in the Youth Choirs section. More recently, the SYC Ensemble Singers topped the contemporary music category of the 58th Concorso Polifonico Internazionale in Arezzo, Italy, and won top prizes at the 7th International Choir Festival Mundus Cantat Sopot, in Poland.

The Choir participated in the choral festival Europa Cantat 2012 in Turin, Italy, where it premiered several festival commissions and participated in ateliers.

=== Collaboration ===
The Choir has worked extensively with choirs, conductors and composers from all over the world. Collaborations have taken the form of an active commissioning program, workshops and concerts with guest conductors, and joint concerts with other choirs – notably, with the Ateneo Chamber Singers (the Philippines) and the Gaia Philharmonic Choir (Japan) in the "Three" series of concerts.

==== Guest conductors ====
1983	László Heltay, Hungary/UK
1987	Sharon Paul, United States
1992	Johannes Meister, Germany/Switzerland
2002	Maria Guinand, Venezuela
2003	Chifuru Matsubara, Japan
2005	Gary Graden], Sweden
2009	Vytautas Miškinis, Lithuania
2011	Steve Dobrogosz, Sweden (Guest Pianist)
2011	Ko Matsushita, Japan
2012	Corrado Margutti, Italy
2013	Jonathan Velasco, the Philippines

==== Three - A Festival of 3 Asian Choirs ====
On 4 December 2006, the SYC Ensemble Singers, together with the Ateneo Chamber Singers (the Philippines) and the Gaia Philharmonic Choir (Japan), launched the series of concerts with the first installation of Three in Singapore. This was followed by "Three Vol. 2 Asian Sound" (2009) held in Tokyo Metropolitan Theatre, "Tatlo: A Choral Celebration" (2011) held in Cultural Center of the Philippines, Manila, and "Three in Sapporo: Songs from the South" (2013) held at the Kitara Concert Hall, Sapporo, Japan. On 14 December 2014, SYC together with Ateneo and Gaia performed "Three: 50th Anniversary Concert" at Esplanade – Theatres on the Bay.
