= Donna Ong =

Singaporean artist

Donna Ong (王美清)
- Born: 30 July 1978 (age 47); Singapore
- Education: BSc, Architecture (Bartlett Centre, University College London, 1999); BFA (Goldsmiths, University of London, 2003); MFA (LASALLE College of the Arts, 2012)
- Known for: Installation art, assemblage, sculpture
- Movement: Contemporary art

Donna Ong (Chinese: 王美清; pinyin: Wáng Měi Qīng; born 30 July 1978) is a Singaporean artist. She is known for her installation works, which often feature environments created with assemblages, found objects, and sculpture. Her practice draws upon notions of botany, landscaping, and representations of nature in both European and Chinese art.

She has exhibited locally and internationally, from the inaugural Singapore Biennale in 2006, the 11th Venice Biennale International Architectural Exhibition in 2008, to the 9th Asia Pacific Triennial of Contemporary Art (APT9) in Brisbane, Queensland, Australia in 2018.

== Education and personal life ==
Donna Ong was born in 1978, daughter of the Singaporean sculptor Michael Ong. Ong attended the Malvern Girls College in Worcestershire, England, now known as Malvern St James. In 1996, Ong began studying the Bartlett Centre in University College London, graduating in 1999 with a Bachelor of Science in Architecture. In 1999, Ong was awarded the bond-free Shell-NAC Arts Scholarship of Singapore to attend Goldsmiths College at the University of London. She graduated in 2003 with a Bachelor of Fine Arts, after which she returned to Singapore. She obtained her MFA from LASALLE College of the Arts, Singapore in 2012.

== Influences ==
Ong's father has taught her manual skills in sculpture that are so vital to create significant works. A lot of her work is inspired by natural history, mythology and psychology. It initially had a morbid and haunting quality that has evolved with time into a more serene atmosphere. Ong’s work would be the contemporary version of the “Gesamtkunstwerk” (Total Artwork) as her installations feature a total environment with which the audience can readily interact. Although the influence of design and architecture is noticeable in her work, there is no doubt that she is fundamentally interested in the production of meaning. Her innate aesthetic sense contributes to the creation of impressive artworks.

Her works are also strongly informed by philosophy, in particular by European philosophers Lyotard and Derrida. Her art practice is very labour-intensive as she manually designs and produces objects and cooperates with lighting and sound specialists to produce the effects she is looking for.

== Career ==
Ong's work has been shown at both local and international exhibitions, institutions, and festivals. She has exhibited at institutions such as the Singapore Art Museum, NUS Museum, and the National Gallery Singapore, as well as at the inaugural Singapore Biennale in 2006. Internationally, she has participated in the 2nd Moscow Biennale in 2007, represented at the Singapore Pavilion during the 11th Venice Biennale International Architectural Exhibition in 2008, the Kwandu Biennale in 2008, the Jakarta Biennale in 2009, the Moscow Biennale of Young Art in 2014, and the 9th Asia Pacific Triennial of Contemporary Art (APT9) in Brisbane, Queensland, Australia in 2018.

Some past works include:

- Secret Interiors: Chrysalis (2006) which explore the secret hidden desires of four fictitious personae, first exhibited at the Singapore Biennale in 2006 and later at the Moscow Biennale in 2007.
- Palace of Dreams (2004), a work involving intricate drawings of insects and a mahogany desk transformed into a plane, referencing fairy tales and childhood dreams.
- Doctor Auctor (2003), a photographic work of 24 pictures in film noir style. This was the winner of the Sefton Open Competition in 2D Art.
- Sing O Barren Woman (2002) a mixed media installation art piece.
- Alpha Omega (1998) a sculpture of a dying woman giving birth.

== Awards ==
- Prudential Eye Awards, Greater Asia. Best Emerging Artist Using Installation (2015)
- NAC Young Artist Award, Singapore. (2009).
- Sefton Open Competition in 2D Art, U.K. (2003). Holding the distinction of being the first photographic art piece ever to win the prize.
- Shell-NAC Scholarship, Singapore. (1999).
- Michelle Knight Art Prize, Malvern Girls' College, UK. (1998).
