= Nikoi Island (Indonesia) =

Island in Indonesia

Coordinates: 1.0521°N 104.7088°E

Pulau Nikoi is a 15-hectare (37-acre) resort island located 8 kilometres (5 mi) off the east coast of Bintan, Indonesia, approximately 85 kilometres (53 mi) southeast of Singapore. The leasehold for the island was purchased by Australian Andrew Dixon in 2005 and developed, with the aid of a group of friends, into a boutique private island resort named Nikoi Island. The resort opened in 2007, and as of 2020 consists of 18 beach houses. The island has been ranked as one of the best private islands in the world by Condé Nast Traveller and reviewed extensively by the world's travel press.

The island has a maximum height of 30 metres, and consists of white sand beaches studded with white granite boulders, with coral reef off-shore. ⅔ of the island is Banyan forest, home to various bird species, while turtles are said to nest on the island's beaches.

The resort was built and is operated with sustainability in mind. The structures have been built with the use of driftwood as the main construction material and alang alang grass as roofing. A double-layered roof design improves ventilation and means that rooms do not require air conditioning. Solar panels are use for heating water and a 52.5 kWp hybrid solar PV array and 77 kW battery bank provides renewal energy for up to 22 hours a day. In 2017 Nikoi established a 7 ha farm following permaculture principles on the mainland of Bintan to provide fresh organic produce to the island. When local farm supply is insufficient, local sources are used as far as possible.

As part of the operators' commitment to sustainable tourism, a non-governmental organization (NGO) called The Island Foundation was registered as a charity in Singapore in 2009 to support the community on Bintan Island. The resort was a runner-up in Wild Asia's 2009 and 2012 Responsible Tourism Awards (Mid-size to Small Accommodation Operators category) and went on to win this award the in 2015. The resort has gone on to win or be a finalist in many other responsible tourism awards notably National Geographic's inaugural World Legacy Awards in 2014 and the a finalist in the WTTC Tourism for Tomorrow Awards in 2019. Nikoi is also a member of The Long Run, a group dedicated to achieving sustainability through the balance of the 4Cs (conservation, community, culture and commerce).

The resort is accessed by launch from Kawal, a small town on Bintan, one hour's drive from the Bintan Resorts ferry terminal.
