= Della Butcher =

- Born: Della Marguerite Hooper; 24 April 1922; London, UK
- Died: 11 January 1993 (aged 70); Singapore
- Other name: Mother of Singapore Artists
- Occupation: Gallery owner
- Known for: Champion of Singapore art

Della Butcher
- Simplified Chinese: 黛拉布彻
Transcriptions
Standard Mandarin
- Hanyu Pinyin: Dài lā bù chè

Della Butcher (24 April 1922 – 11 January 1993) was an art gallery owner and an avid patron of Singapore art, noted for her lifetime of work supporting Singaporean artists and making it an international name.

== Biography ==
Born and raised in London, Della studied art at London College of Art (now Royal College of Art). After her graduation from college in 1939, she joined a fashion house as a designer, but did not stay with the house for long as she had disagreements with work ethics found with the management. She dabbled in auto racing, and joined the British Police Division in Reigate, Surrey at the outbreak of World War II, becoming the first woman constable in the history of that county.

When the war ended, Della took on various jobs such as a telephone operator, before landing herself with a job as a stewardess on the Hunting Clan Airlines. Being a wanderlust by nature, she was enthralled with flying to various parts of Europe and Africa and seeing different cultures and places. She was especially fond of the life and culture of Africa.

In 1953, Della took an office job as a manager for Skyways Aircraft Corporation in Cyprus, where she met and fell in love with an archeologist doing field work in Cyprus, and served as his assistant for the next six years. In her work she learnt more about the archeological artifacts she found, would catalogue and organize her findings into an exhibition to interested parties, and this sent her into a foray with curating art exhibitions. When her archeologist boyfriend was promoted as the new assistant curator for the London Museum, Della decided to part ways with him and moved on with her new life in Beirut, Lebanon to work in Public Relations for the Alumni Association of the American University. Her new experience with art served her well at the university, writing art reviews for the alumni magazine, and in organizing art and artifact exhibitions with the university arts group. In 1964 she met a lady who owned a boutique in Jesselton (now Kota Kinabalu) in Sabah. Della's wanderlust was once again awakened by her stories of new cultures in exotic Asia, and immediately took up her offer to work in her Jesselton boutique as a manager.

On-route to Jesselton, her flight stopped over in Singapore for two days. During her stay, she searched around the island looking for art galleries and museums to visit. She stopped by the Princess Elizabeth Walk near the Esplanade, and was captured by the beautiful creations on display by Singaporean artists Cheong Soo Pieng, Lee Man Fong, Chen Wen Hsi and Thomas Yeo for the first time. She also realized these artists had no art galleries to represent and sell their works at all. When it was time to leave for Jesselton she resolved to return to the island country to make a difference for Singapore artists, just as she boarded the Straits Steamship The Raja Brooke.

Jesselton was a logging town, with a thriving community of white expatriate loggers and local Iban and Kenyah tribespeople interacting. Often these tribespeople would emerge from the jungles with their traditional handicrafts to sell for money, and to buy tobacco and colored calico. Della saw the opportunity to sell Iban and Kenyah crafts and jewellery by exporting these traditional wares to Singapore.

Two and a half years later in 1967, Della came back to Singapore once again. She studied the local art market, and found that there was only the Donald Moore Gallery in Liat Towers which sold artifacts at that time. Before she could get things going, she fell seriously ill, and had to be admitted at the Mount Alvernia Hospital. Though in her grave condition, she had not forgotten her conviction for Singaporean artists and the will to open gallery to promote Singapore art. She was certain that local artists had the potential to succeed as local expatriates were increasingly fond of Chinese artworks by Singapore artists, notwithstanding the lack of interest with art by locals seeking wealth and fortune in post-war Singapore.

In July 1968 Della met Constance Meyer, an expatriate wife living in Singapore, and an avid collector of antiques and Balinese art. They shared a passion for Singapore art, and Constance thought it was essential for Singapore artists to have a place to exhibit their artworks and where tourists visiting Singapore can buy from, in order to develop an international recognition for themselves. Over the next 20 months the two women went into planning and action, searching for a good location to launch their gallery idea. Their gallery, named the Meyer Gallery was officially opened on 17 March 1970 in an old shophouse next to Robinson's Department Store on the corner of Raffles Place and Chulia Street. This gallery was set up with help from the then-Minister for Culture Jek Yuen Thong, Minister for Finance Goh Keng Swee, the Chairman of National Theatre Trust Dr. Goh Poh Seng, the High Commissioner of Malaysia Dr. Lien Ying Chow and the US Ambassador to Singapore, Mr. Francis J. Galbraith.

The new gallery sold both Singapore art, and tribal handicrafts. When Constance migrated to Australia, Della later renamed her gallery The Gallery of Fine Art. Now as a sole proprietor, running the gallery became more challenging for her, and had to take on other freelance jobs like organizing film documentary sessions for multinational corporations, and designing and making 33 pairs of uniforms for Saber Air Private Limited within 3 weeks. Being inexperienced with the business, she faced many criticisms from people but they did not bother her, as she was single-minded with getting buyers for Singapore artists. To maximize exposure of the artworks for potential sale, she would set up shop at busy hotel lobbies, makeshift stalls on street pavements and even the decks of luxury liners. She would even visit potential clients around the island with paintings in the boot of her old yellow 1962 Morris Minor. On 21 November 1972, a massive fire broke out at Robinson's Department Store and The Gallery of Fine Art was irreparably damaged. The losses from the fire and having to start another gallery again at the Raffles Hotel meant she had to recoup her losses fast. She began to exhibit art at the Long Bar and the Tiffin Room in the hotel, as well as investing in property and collecting rent to supplement her income. As her business grew in the late-1970s, Della relocated The Gallery to the Orchard Towers, where she began her headway to bring Singapore art to the rest of the world.

In 1977, Della found her first opportunity to showcase 22 Singaporean artworks to showcase at the Royal Overseas Art Exhibition in London, with transportation costs sponsored by the Singapore Airlines, and with the help of the Art Society of Brussels, a major 5-gallery art exhibition in Belgium. In January 1979, she clinched another sponsorship from the Airlines to put up a series of art exhibitions featuring 150 paintings by 8 Singaporean artists – Ang Ah Tee, Nai Swee Leng, Ong Kim Seng, Tang Juey Lee, Tay Bak Koi, Wan Soon Kam, and sibling artists Henry and Karen Hoisington – in the Middle Eastern cities of Bahrain, Dubai and Kuwait. The exhibition tour began in the city of Bahrain on 9 January 1979, and lasted for 5 days at each city. In spite of the fact that she had organized the show single-handedly, the touring exhibition received enormous success especially in the city of Dubai. The Dubai Arts Society also had sponsored mobile screens to exhibit the paintings at the Dubai Sheraton Hotel. She had not only sold 50 paintings in that city alone, the show had also helped to generate much interest in Singapore as tourist spot, by the locals. Further to that the Society had also agreed to cultural exchange exhibitions with artists from both lands, in Dubai and at her Gallery in Singapore respectively in the following year.

In 1982, The Gallery of Fine Art opened a new branch at the newly opened Changi Airport. It was claimed as the world's first art gallery to be found in an airport. The Gallery was unique as it had no walls, and the paintings were displayed on mobile revolving screens. She also held exhibitions on board the luxury cruise ship, The Princess Mahsuri (now known as Spirit of Adventure) in 1984. Della's reputation grew to be known as one of the first local art dealers who promoted Singapore art overseas, and to declare that Singapore art were on par with "international standards".

UNESCO also noted her keen business sense, on their study of the Singapore arts climate over two occasions between 1980 and 1982. In the study of the Singapore art culture between 2 May and 8 May 1980, Duncan noted Della's uniqueness in making use of Mandarin Hotel's premises to launch her ambitious series of exhibitions, in contrast to peer art galleries which normally had art exhibitions within their own premises. In fact, this uniqueness went one step further in the 1986 Arts Festival fringe art effort held between 31 May and 15 June. During the Festival Della showcased an exhibition of orchid paintings by Tang Juey Lee at the Hilton Hotel Music Room. At the same time, an exhibition of Choy Moo Kheong's paintings was advised to, and curated at the rival Low Pine Gallery in Ming Court Hotel, also as part of the Festival programme. Though both Tang and Choy were represented by Della's gallery, she had no qualms to Choy exhibiting with a competitor, and even providing aid to setting up the exhibition at the location. This not only demonstrated flexibility in running her arts business, it also showed her generosity to work with, and share with her peers.

Tang And Choy's exhibition was the last show she had organized with the Gallery of Fine Arts. With her poor health she ended the gallery business at the end of the Arts Festival in 1986. She returned to business again in 1988 with a new Della Butcher Gallery located in Cuppage Terrace.

== Della Butcher Art Gallery at 39A Cuppage Terrace ==
Della Butcher Art Gallery logo and address

In the new location Della continued her championing work for Singaporean artists in the refurbished Peranakan house. Though she is a businesswoman, she is clear that her heart for the business was never set on making money. It was important to her that art is the heart and soul of nations, and thus a successful art gallery runs on strong passions for the art they represent.

Though Singapore became increasingly affluent, she continued to fight perceptual challenges by locals that art is only for the rich and that buying art is an unpragmatic luxury that served no purpose especially during economic recessions, when people are more concerned about bread-and-butter issues. She acceded that this perception was especially true during economic recessions and people would find art serving no purpose to them. Even offices would just put up "economically-friendly" items to bring out the ambience of the place, during these hard times.
That being said, Della advocated Singaporean art have their unique qualities and also represent good value for money, as compared to other art from similar establishments and values in Asia.

Della's hands-on approach in running her art gallery and her devotion to the artists she represents, continued to be her formula for success. With her artistic experience and appreciation of the paintings' unique personalities she would personally deliver and hang the paintings for her clients, to bring out the best for her clients' homes.
On 29 November 1990 Della was invited to be a part of a task force to look into the development of the arts industry and to develop it into one that can contribute to economic growth. This task force, under the Economic Development Board's Creative Services strategic business unit (SBU), composed of art experts from commercial and educational institutions, was to make a four-month assessment of the state of fine arts in Singapore, with particular emphasis on promoting and selling Singapore art.

== The Mother of Singapore Artists ==
In all the 24 years Della's big heart was open to every Singaporean artist she had met and her larger-than-life personality was ready to reach out to more – artists or non-artists alike. Stephens remembered her penchant for picking up strays and let them stay in her house. And true enough, you would often find an eclectic mix of people living in her home on No. 1 Preston Road. Whenever foreign artists visit Singapore, she would also gladly provide them with accommodation at her place.

The name 'Della Butcher' was never far from the memories of many Singapore artists and peers from her industry. A rival gallery owner had nothing but praises for her indomitable spirit to help Singapore artists through the decades. Whether it was in the 60s or the 70s when Singapore art was deemed unsaleable, or in the 80s when the Singapore art market was invaded by China art, Della stayed on with Singapore artists. The late Cultural Medallion artist Ng Eng Teng attested to this unshakeable faith of hers, citing that she never gave up even when artists were relatively unknown to anyone and continued to push on with her beliefs despite growing competition from other galleries and during bad times. Whenever artists faced financial problems she was always ready to give them money, and to buy their paintings to tide them over. Watercolourist Ong Kim Seng remembered in his first exposure at a group artshow that Della organized, he was disappointed that he had not been able to sell a single piece of art. He was overjoyed when he received a call from her the next day telling him that one of his paintings was sold during the show, only to find out much later in his life that the one painting was actually bought by Della herself.

Indian woman artist Roopa Natarajan had a very successful exhibition by Della in 1991, featuring the artist's series of nude paintings and sold nearly all the 43 paintings (35 oils and eight watercolour paintings) She was grateful to Della for launching her career in Singapore art circles and attributed much of that success to her.

By 1992 Della had mounted more than 300 exhibitions involving 100 artists in Singapore and abroad. As a tribute to her, 24 Singaporean artists who had all worked with her at some stage in their careers, held The Mother of the Artists exhibition in honour of her 70th birthday on 24 April 1992. It was held at the Riverwalk Galleria Exhibition Hall, and a 60 cm by 72 cm portrait of Della painted by Beijing artist Li GuiHua, was presented at the opening of the exhibition.

Besides championing for the arts, her friends remember her for her sense of righteousness, and her willingness to fight for it. Mrs Ros Lovell, owner of lifestyle shop Cho Lon in Holland village and Della's neighbour remembered that she once spent several days chained to a tree, in order to protest and save it from being cut down. Friends took meals to her in support of her cause, and eventually saved the tree.

Della Butcher died in her sleep on Monday morning at her home in 1 Preston Road.

== Della Butcher Award ==
In recognition of her lifetime commitment to championing for Singaporean art, Professor Tommy Koh had made a formal request to the Rotary Club of Orchard, Singapore to create an award and to be given to the best graduate painter from Lasalle-SIA College of the Arts in her honour. This request was made on the formal installation ceremony of the club's third President, Professor Val Winslow on 15 June 1993. The trophy was designed by Temasek Polytechnic, with a S$2,000 prize money sponsored by MasterCard.

The Club invited Lasalle to select five outstanding students with consistently high performances as nominees for the award, and presented to the best art student with the first Della Butcher Award at a closed-door ceremony in 1994. In 1995, this Award opened its doors to 5 other nominated students from the Nanyang Academy of Fine Arts (NAFA). But unlike the inaugural Award, all 10 nominees from the academy and Lasalle were recognized for their unique artistic expression. The fourth President of the Rotary Club Orchard Vijay Krishnan believed that recognizing a wide spectrum of artistic expression would be ideal in honouring Della's spirit and her open-ness to supporting all forms of Singaporean art in her lifetime. In 1996, the Award continued to expand its recognition of art forms, and presented to a graduating art student from the National Institute of Education.

In November 1995, Friends of Della Butcher and the Club held an exhibition-cum-auction of Della's personal trove of art prints and 75 paintings. These works of art were by artist-friends like Ong Kim Seng, Tay Bak Koi, Nai Swee Leng, Prabhakara Jimmy Quek and Ang Ah Tee, and bought with Della's own pocket as her support for these artists in their struggling years. The total collection valued at S$87,000, was displayed and auctioned at the Regent Hotel. After the three-day event all the money raised was used to fund the Della Butcher Foundation, ensuring the Della Butcher Award can continue to be awarded to promising young artists. At the same time, the Foundation had intentions to give out art scholarships for promising young artists in Singapore in the future.
