= Evelyn Lip =

Evelyn Lip (born 1938) is a Malaysian architecture scholar and Feng shui consultant.

She is the author of fifty eight books on architecture, Chinese geomancy, and children's stories. Dr. Lip has completed nearly one thousand illustrations and paintings featured in her books.

Dr. Lip was a lecturer for 31 years in the Department of Architecture at the National University of Singapore before retiring at the age of 60. She specializes in Chinese architecture and applies geomancy to her practice.

Dr. Lip has given around 160 public speeches in Singapore and abroad on traditional Chinese architecture, Feng shui and Chinese art and culture.

In 1989, the Singapore Tourist Promotion Board together with its American counterpart, organised a 32-day publicity tour covering 9 American cities. Dr. Lip was part of a delegation of six specialists from various fields who travelled to the US to promote the art, culture and conservation efforts of Singapore.

== Qualifications ==
- PhD in Architecture
- Master in Architecture
- Professional Dip Architecture
- Dip Building Design
- Dip Interior Design
- Two years at the Nanyang Academy of Fine Arts on Chinese Brush Painting

== Works ==
- Featured in: Meetings with Remarkable Asian Women (2012) Quicksilver Books. ASIN B007YCEXZA
- Author: Feng Shui for Harmony in the Home (2010) Cavendish Square Publishing. ISBN 9812615946
- Author: Your Face is Your Fortune (2010) Cavendish Square Publishing. ISBN 9812616357
- Author: All You Need to Know about Feng Shui (2009) Cavendish Square Publishing. ISBN 9812615938
- Author: Feng Shui for Success in Business (2009) Cavendish Square Publishing. ISBN 9812615954
- Author: Feng Shui in Chinese Architecture (2009) Cavendish Square Publishing. ISBN 9812616349
- Author: Personalise your Feng Shui and Transform your Life (2009) Cavendish Square Publishing. ISBN 9812615962
- Author: Chinese Practices and Beliefs (2001) Heian International. ISBN 0893469289
- Author: Design and Feng Shui of Logos, Trademarks and Signboards (1998) Stone Bridge Press. ISBN 0893468649
- Author: Personalize your Feng Shui: A Step by Step Guide to the Pillars of Destiny (1997) Heian International. ISBN 0893468487
- Author: 1000 Character Classic (1997) Raffles Editions. ISBN 9971002221
- Author: Feng Shui for Business (1995) Times Editions. ISBN 9812041389
- Author: Feng Shui: Environments of Power - A Study of Chinese Architecture (1995) Wiley. ISBN 1854904272
- Author: Fun with Astrology (1994) Graham Brash. ISBN 9812180338
- Author: Out of China (1993) Addison-Wesley. ISBN 0201628546
- Author: Chinese Geomancy (1992) Times Books International. ISBN 9812040692
- Author: Chinese Numbers (1992) Heian International. ISBN 9780893463762
- Author: Feng Shui for the Home (1990) Heian International. ISBN 0-89346-327-2
- Author: Feng Shui for the Business (1989) Stone Bridge Press. ISBN 0-89346-326-4
- Author: Choosing Auspicious Chinese Names (1988) Stone Bridge Press. ISBN 0893468479
- Author: Feng Shui: A Layman's Guide to Chinese Geomancy (1987) Times Books International. ISBN 0-89346-286-1
- Author: Notes on Things Chinese (1986) Federal Publications. ISBN 9971490617
- Author: Chinese Beliefs and Superstitions (1985) Graham Brash. ISBN 981218032X
- Author: Chinese Proverbs and Sayings (1984) Graham Brash. ISBN 9971947617
- Author: Chinese Temples and Deities (1981) Times Books International. ISBN 9971650533
- Author: The Fairy Princess (1981) Macmillan Education Ltd. ISBN 0333312414
