= Far East Shopping Centre =

Mixed-use building in Singapore

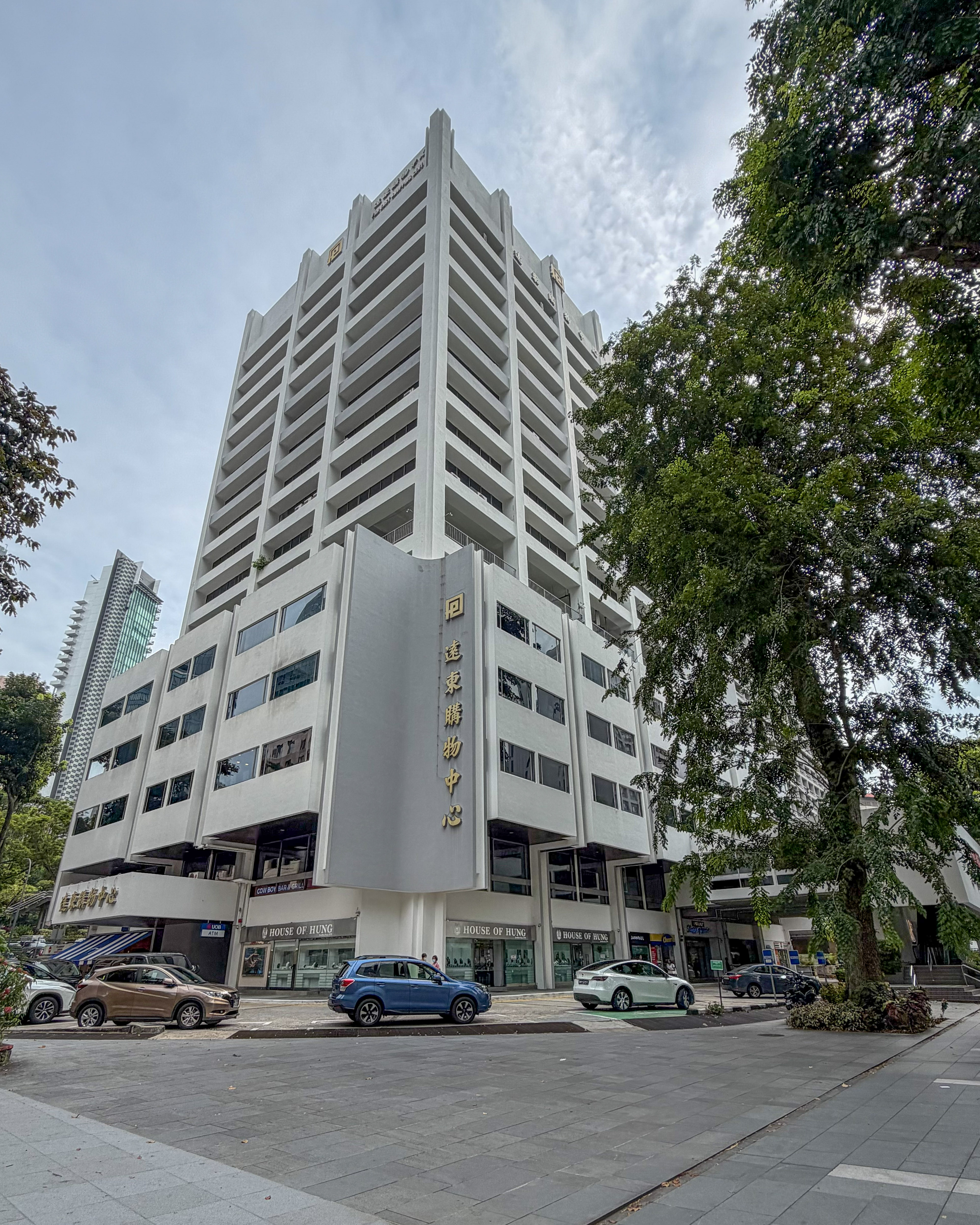
- Location: Singapore
- Coordinates: 1.3063°N 103.8310°E
- Address: 545 Orchard Rd, Singapore 238882
- Opened: December 1974

Far East Shopping Centre is an office cum shopping complex at the junction of Orchard Road and Angullia Park in Singapore. Opened in 1974, it was the first shopping centre in the country with an atrium and external escalators. It was also the first with an overhead pedestrian bridge crossing Orchard Road, though this was demolished in the 1980s.

== History ==
Piling work for the complex began around December 1971. Construction, which was initially projected to cost $20 million, was then expected to finish by the end of 1973. The developer was Orchard Central Holdings, a subsidiary of the property development group Far East Organization, after which the building was named. It was planned "in response to the government's call to develop Orchard Road into a premier shopping and tourist centre." BEP Akitek served as the consultant architects for the project, which was to have 57,800 square feet (5,370 m^{2}) of shop space and 97,000 square feet (9,000 m^{2}) of office space. Piling work finished by June 1972. It was then expected that the complex would be complete by 1974.

It was initially to comprise ten storeys of offices and machine room resting on a nine-storey-tall shopping podium, along with two basement floors, which were to feature an exhibition gallery in addition to a carpark with a capacity for roughly 200 vehicles. There were to be two exits, one to Orchard Road and the other to Angullia Park, each serviced by "high-speed lifts and escalators." Four lifts would service the entire building while the shopping podium was to be serviced by escalators. The office space was designed in such a way as to "form an independent unit by giving maximum privacy and an unobstructed panoramic view." The complex was to be connected to the other side of Orchard Road via a covered overhead pedestrian bridge. It was the first building to have such a bridge cross Orchard Road and was built "for the convenience of shoppers and pedestrians" at "the government's request". The bridge was to lead directly to a bus stop.

By May 1974, construction, which had ended up costing $50 million, was "nearing completion" and the complex was then scheduled to open in July. It had involved "some of the latest concepts in shopping complex construction". 80% of the shop and office units had already been filled. The shopping podium was now to be only seven-storeys tall with a mezzanine, housing 190 stores, which were to be located from the ground to the third floors and the second basement floor. The fourth floor was to house a coffee house. The podium, which featured "common corridors" for "easy movements", was to be serviced by 15 escalators, which made it the shopping centre with the most escalators in the region. The shop units were designed to offer "double side display frontages". The top floor of the building was to house administrative offices, as well as maintenance offices serving the building. Construction on the bridge, which was to span 35 metres, began at the end of December.

Far East Shopping Centre opened by December 1974, with a shopping podium only 5 storeys tall. It was "one of Singapore's first giant shopping complexes". The occupancy rate for the shopping centre was only 5% at its opening. This poor performance was attributed to an "economic slowdown and crisis in the property market" in 1974. By November 1975, all of its office units, save for several on the top floor, had been rented out. The offices of the German Embassy in Singapore moved into the building by 1977. From 1976 onwards, rentals "appreciated steadily", followed by an "exceptional increase" of 6% of the average yearly compound rate of increase in rental from 1977 to 1978. Despite this, with little to no growth in rentals overall by 1980, Ng Kok Eng of The Business Times wrote that the shopping centre "must have on the whole been a disappointment" to Far East. Ng noted that the shops on the mall's lower three floors were "more successful" than those on the upper floors. However, according to Roots, the complex "proved to be successful", after which the Far East Organisation began developing several similar complexes along Orchard Road. In this period, the complex's stores partially relied on tourists.

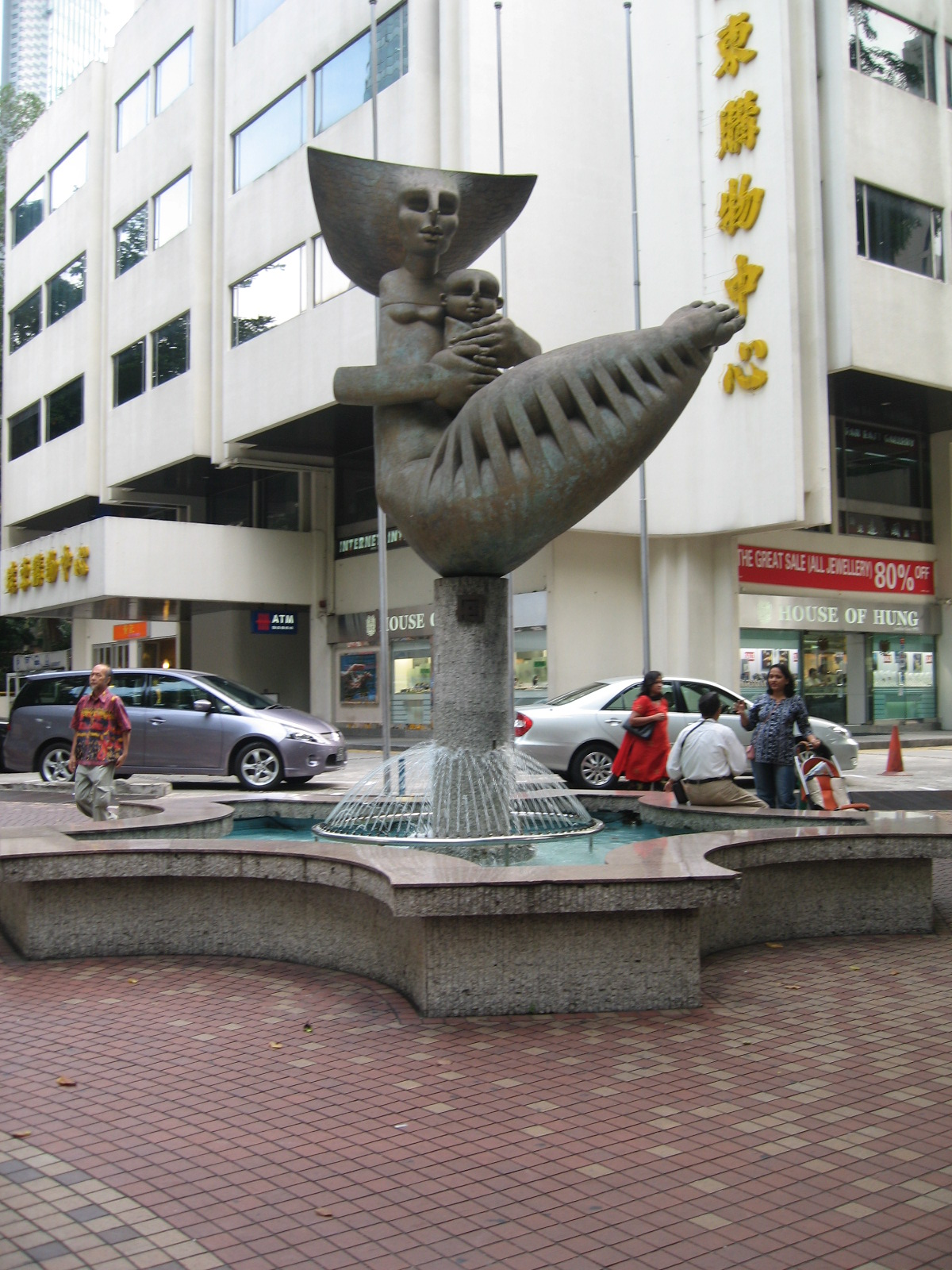
The Ng Eng Teng sculpture Mother and Child in front of the complex in 2006. The sculpture has since been relocated to West Coast Plaza.

On 10 August 1980, a fire on the ninth floor destroyed half of the offices of Ultramare (S) Pte Ltd. This was followed by yet another fire on the 10th floor on 29 October which partially destroyed the offices of the Brawan International Trading Company. In July 1981, the Ng Eng Teng ciment fondu sculpture Mother and Child, commissioned by the Orchard Holding Centre, was placed in the pedestrian mall next to the complex. A police kiosk staffed by two police officers was opened at the complex in February 1983. It was primarily used by tourists seeking directions. In March, it was announced that the overhead bridge would be demolished to make way for the widening of Orchard Road. The Ministry of National Development announced in July that the complex was one of the last 13 "energy-guzzling" buildings in the country. Architect Richard Ho opined in 1984 that the road in between the complex and the pedestrian mall along Orchard Road was "totally redundant" and had prevented the area from being livelier. Shirley Tan reported in the same year that the mall was frequented by 'bikeys' of various different 'gangs', who would come in groups of 15 to 20 and "shoot the breeze, eat french fries and drink Pepsis." They wouldn't "do anything much", though 'bikeys' of different gangs also wouldn't "mix" due to "tribe loyalties". In April 1986, the former employees of the recently-shuttered restaurant Troika on Bras Basah Road, opened the 100-seat eatery Shashlik Restaurant as a continuation, with several pieces of furniture being taken from the former restaurant and the name being taken from a dish at Troika. It was popular in the 1980s and 1990s and became known for its "borsch, steak and meat on skewers, with regulars from the former restaurant continuing to patronise Shashlik. In July 1988, Jeffery Tsang reported that Cafe Times on the mall's ground floor had become a "favourite haunt" for bikers. The complex's management announced in October that they were looking into ways to stop the sale of counterfeit goods at the shopping centre, which then had around 300 shops.

In February 1989, Far East announced that the complex would be undergoing a $1 million to $1.2 million facelift. By then, the shopping centre was known for its jewellery and tailoring stores and the antique house Kwok Gallery, as well as computers and health equipment that were on sale. The renovation works began in August and were then expected to take nine months, during which shops would remain open. The facelift, which was to renovate the floors, the toilets and the entrance, aimed to give the complex an "upmarket image", allowing it to compete with newer, more popular malls. Business at the complex was then "pretty slow" when compared to the "more popular" and "visibly busy and thriving" Far East Plaza, with which it was often confused. It was known for being "touristy in price and merchandise" and shoppers were further discouraged from the complex by "touts" who "hovered" outside the mall. Its performance was also attributed to the older building being "not as bright" and the lack of anchor tenants like McDonald's and Metro. The complex's anchor tenant then was jewellery store House of Hung, which occupied much of the ground floor. Despite the lower footfall, most of the stores were "reasonably successful", relying on regular customers as opposed to tourists. In October, the shopping centre was named as a "key location" for the gathering of youths. The complex's police kiosk was closed on 1 May 1990 as it was little used.

The mall's facelift, which ended up costing around $2 million, was completed by December 1992. "Tacky-looking" stores were replaced by those which offered "better goods and services." The air-conditioning system was updated and the carpark was expanded. An additional $20,000 was spent on changing the signage such that it would be more distinct and memorable. Businesses operating at the mall then included jewellery stores, money-changers, department stores, shoe-repairers, locksmiths, PR firms, interior designers, tailors, hair salons and fashion boutiques, stores selling furniture, electronics, women's accessories, antiques, arts and crafts, textiles, sportswear and musical instruments, as well as restaurants and fast food outlets.

In October 1997, Far East announced that they were considering putting the complex up for en bloc sale, which was then "unusual" as en bloc sales were typically for residential developments. Essential oil manufacturer Koh Kok Leong and perfumer Michael Williams gave the shopping centre a "Smelly Sock Rating" of 3/4, finding that the mall stunk of "smelly toilets, whiffs of stale cigarette smoke and a spicy soup odour on the lower levels." A spokesman for the mall's management claimed that much of the stench was caused by tenants "smoking and eating durian in their shops, which happens often." In 2008, Qisahn, a video games store known for selling games at cheaper prices relocated to the mall from IOI Plaza.

Stephanie Gwee wrote in August 2009 that the primary reason for visiting the mall was to park one's car at the mall's four-storey carpark. However, she felt that the complex was "filled with several noteworthy shops selling fashionable togs as well as sportswear." Sandra Leong of The Straits Times reported in April 2010 that the mall was in "poor" condition with "lousy" air conditioning and that it was in a "desperate need of a facelift". Tenants then paid "almost half the rent you pay inside the CBD." The primary draws then were Shashlik and ten or more golf shops, with the "golf scene" at the complex having sprung up a decade ago in "monkey see, monkey do" fashion. These businesses largely relied on regulars. By November, business at several malls in the area, including the Far East Shopping Centre, had "suffered" from the opening of newer, "glitzy" shopping centres such as Knightsbridge Mall or ION Orchard. It was reported in December that another cause of the significant decline in business for the malls was the removal of a street-level crossing on Paterson Road at its junction with Orchard Road, deemed a "safety hazard", in September 2009. Shoppers were meant to use the underground linkway instead, but many were unable to locate it, resulting in shoppers being unable to access the complex. The Orchard Road Business Association launched appeals to both the Land Transport Authority and the Ministry of Trade and Industry, seeking to reinstate the crossing.

In July 2015, the management of Shashlik announced that the restaurant would close when the lease ran out due to aging staff, challenges in hiring and "slow" business, though they also stated that they were not opposed to selling the business. Jaime Ee of The Business Times called its closure a "natural death for a restaurant that had long outlived its relevance" and opined that it "hit Singaporeans personally because it meant closing the door to a past that they liked to visit now and then, but not enough for it to stay in business." However, it reopened in April 2016 at the same location, reportedly partially to "tap into the lost generation's growing appetite for heritage." Ee felt that, while the restaurant was "okay" at offering comfort and heritage cuisine, it could be "so much more" if it "went beyond sentimental appeal and focused wholeheartedly on reviving long-lost Hainanese recipes."

In the late 2010s, cartoonist Troy Chin advised tourists against visiting the mall, calling it a "ZOMBIE building", as "once the maid agency virus spreads to such an extent, it's already beyond dead". Of his time in the mall visiting an acquaintance with an office at the complex, he wrote: "The walk along the corridor to his office was lined with other offices with ambiguous names that were very likely fronts for some dubious shit. And every time we headed down to the retail floors to check out how bad the decay was, we were greeted with the increased infection of maid agencies that fill up any other shop that vacated."

In July 2023, the complex was put up for collective sale with a guide price of $928 million. Under the Urban Redevelopment Authority's Strategic Development Incentive, the gross floor area of a redeveloped building on the plot could be extended by 20% at most if it was part of a "joint integrated redevelopment with adjacent sites." In September, it was announced that Glory Property Developments, a company "linked" to Bright Ruby Resources and Du Shanghua, was set to purchase the complex for $910 million. However, the deal fell through as Glory Property Developments as its redevelopment proposal for the site was rejected by the Urban Redevelopment Authority. The deal would have been "Singapore's largest for a commercial property in 2023". The complex was again put up for sale with a guide price of $928 million on 19 April 2024, shortly after the previous deal fell through. An analyst from Mogul.sg felt that the price was too high for the attempt at a collective sale to be successful. The tender closed without any bids. The mall then received an offer of $850 million, though this also fell through, receiving support from only 60% of the complex's unit owners, with 80% being the requisite.
