= Heng Xu =

Chinese information technology professor

- Education: Shandong University; National University of Singapore; Nanyang Academy of Fine Arts
- Scientific career
- Fields: Information technology
- Workplaces: Pennsylvania State University; American University

Heng Xu is a professor specializing in corporate social responsibility regarding big data, artificial intelligence, and machine learning. She is a professor in the Department of Information Technology and Analytics and the Director of Kogod Cybersecurity Governance Center at the Kogod School of Business of American University.

== Life ==
Xu earned a B.B.A. in Information Systems from the Shandong University School of Management in 2001. In 2006, she completed a Ph.D. in Information Systems from the National University of Singapore School of Computing. While completing her doctoral studies, Xu studied fashion designing, enrolling part-time at the Nanyang Academy of Fine Arts.

Xu joined the College of Information Sciences and Technology at the Pennsylvania State University as an assistant professor in 2006. She became director of its privacy analytics lab in 2007. From 2012 to June 2018, she was an associate professor with tenure. In this role, she researched the social and technical aspects of information privacy. From August 2013 to August 2016, Xu was a program director in the directorate for social, behavioral, and economic sciences at the National Science Foundation. In that role, she oversaw secure and trustworthy cyberspace (SaTC), critical technics, and technologies for advancing big data science and engineering.

In July 2018, Xu joined the Kogod School of Business at American University as a professor of information technology and analytics. She is the director of the Kogod cybersecurity governance center and co-director of the robust analytics lab. She researches corporate social responsibility with big data and artificial intelligence, fairness in machine learning, and cybersecurity management.
