= University of the Arts Singapore =

Private university in Singapore

Coordinates: 1.300229°N 103.851573°E

- Universiti Seni Singapura (Malay) 新加坡藝術大學 (Chinese) சிங்கப்பூர் கலைப் பல்கலைக்கழகம் (Tamil)
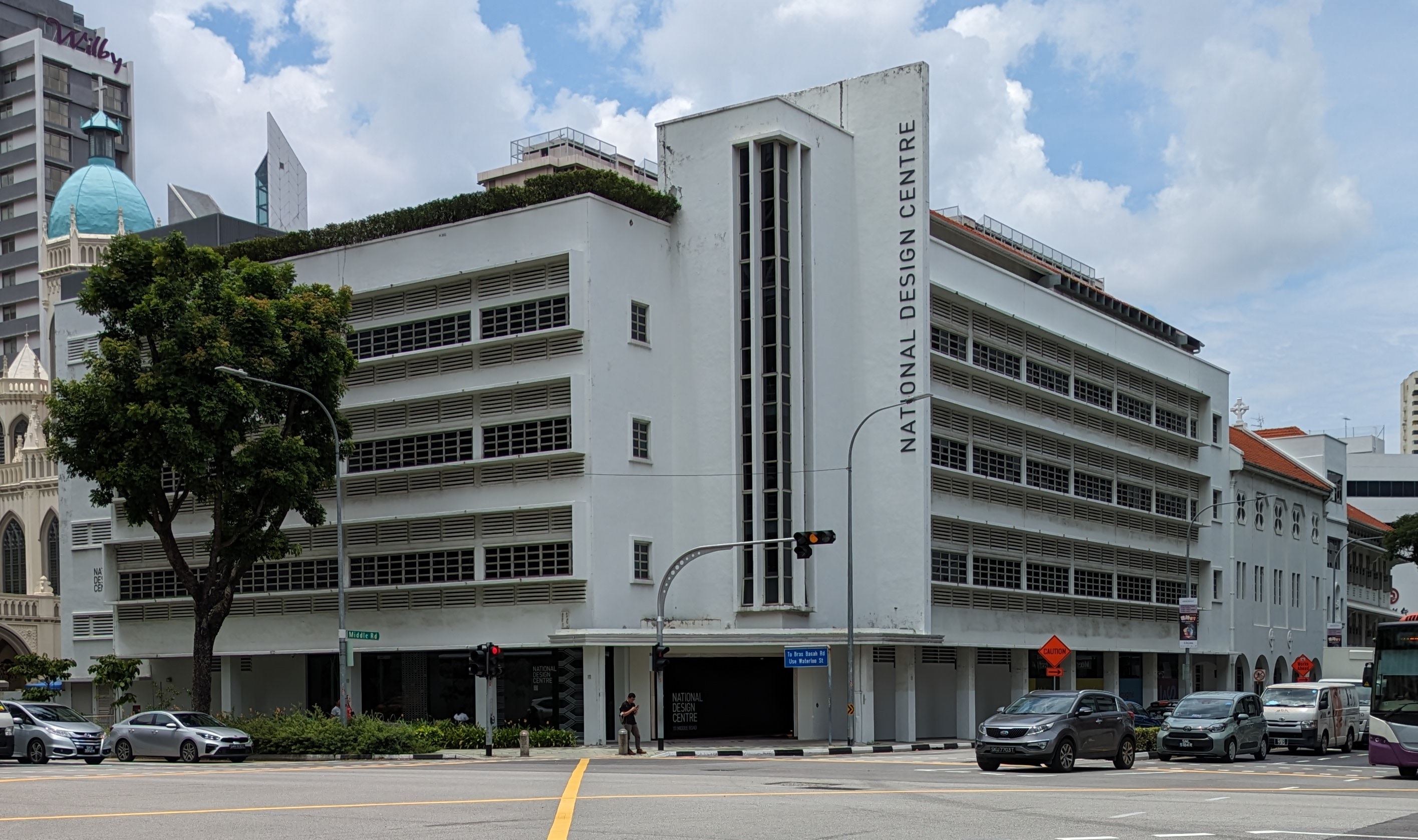
- National Design Centre, location of the UAS office
- Type: Publicly–funded private university of the arts
- Established: Announced in March 2021
- Chairman: Jose Isidro Camacho
- Vice-Chancellor: Kwok Kian Woon
- Location: Middle Road, Bencoolen Street, McNally Street, Singapore
- Campus: Urban
- Language: English
- Website: uas.edu.sg

The University of the Arts Singapore (UAS) is Singapore's first university of the arts. It was formally announced in 2021, as an alliance between LASALLE College of the Arts (LASALLE) and Nanyang Academy of Fine Arts (NAFA). Under this arrangement, the two institutions operate as distinct entities yet allows students to access opportunities from both schools.

The UAS office is located at the National Design Centre in Middle Road, amidst the arts and heritage precinct of Bras Basah Bugis.

UAS commenced its inaugural intake in August 2024 and confers degrees as Singapore's 7th University.

== History ==
The idea of a Singapore arts university was mooted as early as the Report of the Advisory Council on Culture and the Arts in 1989. The ACCA Report noted that none of the local institutions taught the arts at a degree level and Singaporeans had to pursue their art studies overseas. In addition, facilities of private schools were inadequate and did not enjoy Government assistance. The ACCA Report recommended that the Ministry of Education could consider establishing a Faculty of Art and Design and a School of Performing Arts in the proposed new university.

In the late 1990s to early 2000s, the notion of "Creative Singapore" was extolled to unlock the potential of the arts and to cultivate a global city for the arts. There was a Committee to Upgrade LASALLE-SIA and NAFA, which recommended polytechnic level government funding for both institutions and to establish an Institute of the Arts (ITA) at National University of Singapore in 2001 to conduct degree courses in the performing arts. It is unknown why the ITA proposal evolved to Yong Siew Toh Conservatory of Music in 2003 and the School of Art, Design and Media at Nanyang Technological University in 2005.

The formation of an arts University was revived during the Parliamentary debate for the Ministry of Education's budget in March 2021. Minister Lawrence Wong announced the appointment of a pro-tem committee led by Prof Chan Heng Chee, tasked to envisage the role of the first arts University in Singapore and the region, and to develop a sustainable operating model.

== Programmes ==
The University will offer Bachelor and Master degree programmes in fine arts, design, media arts, performing arts and arts management, as well as in new and upcoming areas in the applied arts. Undergraduate students will undergo a common curriculum and industry attachments to complement their specialized arts education.

Programmes
Constituent	Degree
Lasalle College of the Arts	BA (Hons) Acting
Lasalle College of the Arts	BA (Hons) Animation Art
Lasalle College of the Arts	BA (Hons) Art Histories and Curatorial Practices: Asia and the World
Lasalle College of the Arts	BA (Hons) Design Communication
Lasalle College of the Arts	BA (Hons) Design for Social Futures
Lasalle College of the Arts	BA (Hons) Fashion Design and Textiles
Lasalle College of the Arts	BA (Hons) Fashion Media and Industries
Lasalle College of the Arts	BA (Hons) Fine Arts
Lasalle College of the Arts	BA (Hons) Film
Lasalle College of the Arts	BA (Hons) Interior Design
Lasalle College of the Arts	BA (Hons) International Contemporary Dance Practices
Lasalle College of the Arts	BA (Hons) Music
Lasalle College of the Arts	BA (Hons) Music Business
Lasalle College of the Arts	BA (Hons) Musical Theatre
Lasalle College of the Arts	BA (Hons) Product Design
Lasalle College of the Arts	MA Art Therapy
Lasalle College of the Arts	MA Arts and Cultural Leadership
Lasalle College of the Arts	MA Arts and Ecology
Lasalle College of the Arts	MA Arts Pedagogy and Practice
Lasalle College of the Arts	MA Asian Art Histories
Lasalle College of the Arts	MA Creative Writing
Lasalle College of the Arts	MA Design
Lasalle College of the Arts	MA Fine Arts
Lasalle College of the Arts	MA Music Therapy
Nanyang Academy of Fine Arts	BA (Hons) Biophilic Design
Nanyang Academy of Fine Arts	BA (Hons) Contemporary Chinese Theatres
Nanyang Academy of Fine Arts	Master of Fine Arts Fine Art
Nanyang Academy of Fine Arts	BA (Hons) Fine Art (NAFA & UAL Programme)
Nanyang Academy of Fine Arts	BA (Hons) Design Practice (NAFA & UAL Programme)
Nanyang Academy of Fine Arts	BA (Hons) Performance Making (NAFA & UAL Programme)
Nanyang Academy of Fine Arts	Bachelor of Music (Honours) (jointly conferred by the RCM and the UAS)
Nanyang Academy of Fine Arts	Bachelor of Education (Honours) in Instrumental & Vocal Teaching (NAFA & RCM Programme)
Nanyang Academy of Fine Arts	Master of Composition (NAFA & RCM Programme)
Nanyang Academy of Fine Arts	Master of Performance
