= Equator Art Society =

Artist group in 50s Singapore

Chua Mia Tee, National Language Class, 1959, Oil on canvas, 112 x 153 cm, Collection of National Gallery Singapore

The Equator Art Society was an artists' group founded in 1956 in Singapore, known for promoting social realist art. The Equator Art Society sought to represent the realities and struggles of the masses, depicting Singapore's working classes and the poor often through the use of portraiture painting, woodcut prints, and sculpture. Founding society members and leaders included artists such as Lim Yew Kuan, Lai Kui Fang, Chua Mia Tee, Ong Kim Seng and Koeh Sia Yong.

Active during and following the period of the Malayan Emergency, the Equator Art Society was notably anti-colonial and nationalistic, with its members often critical of the colonial government and supportive of the formulation of a distinct Malayan consciousness. The Equator Art Society was de-registered on 11 January 1974, with social realist art declining in Singapore in the 1970s.

== History ==
=== The Singapore Chinese Middle Schools' Graduates of 1953 Arts Association ===
After World War II, artists were influenced by increasing anti-colonial nationalism to depict the sociopolitical conditions of Singapore and Malaya. The social realism movement gained traction in Singapore from the mid-1950s, with artists attempting to reflect lived experience in Singapore through realist-style painting and socially-engaged practices, directly involving their subjects to create works that commented on social issues. For instance, artists interacted with workers to gain an understanding of their problems, conducting their own research into the struggles of the working classes.

In 1956, a travelling fundraising exhibition was held by an art association comprising students from local Chinese middle schools, called the Singapore Chinese Middle Schools' Graduates of 1953 Arts Association (SCMSGAA). The show aimed to fundraise for the building of Singapore's only Chinese-language private university, Nantah (later merged to form the present-day National University of Singapore). The Association first exhibited at the Chinese Chamber of Commerce in Singapore, and later in Kuala Lumpur and Penang. At this travelling exhibition, Chua Mia Tee presented his now well-known oil painting, Epic Poem of Malaya (1955), a work embodying desires for a distinct Malayan nationalism in the younger generation.

Promoting social realism as a method for representing the realities of the working class and enacting social change, the exhibition catalogue stated their belief that "Art belongs to the people—it is the public, and should serve the public," proclaiming that they were "prepared to commit all our efforts to help Malaya gain her independence and her process of nation-building." The SCMSGAA stopped activities after the exhibition, likely because of its perceived left-leaning politics and its strong critique of colonial administration. The SCMSGAA was dissolved in October 1956, within a month of the Chinese middle schools riots and the dissolution of the Singapore Chinese Middle School Students' Union.

=== Founding ===
On 22 June 1956, a new art society called the Equator Art Society (EAS) was registered, made of many members previously from SCMSGAA. The EAS organised exhibitions for its members, conducted art theory research and study seminars, also holding art classes at beginner, intermediate, and advanced levels. Besides its visual art wing, the society also had active wings for literature, music, and theatre. EAS also had a role in the woodcut movement of the 1950s.

In 1958, the EAS organised its inaugural exhibition featuring over 400 works including sculpture and oil paintings, watercolours, and pastels. Portraiture was the main genre of work shown at this exhibition. Works such as Lim Yew Kuan's Painting Class (1957) demonstrate the types of portraits produced by members of EAS, depicting students and workers that represent familiar social groups in Singapore. These influences can be traced to realist artists such as Gustave Courbet and Auguste Rodin from Europe, and Ilya Repin from Russia.

The 1960 Equator Art Society exhibition saw the exhibiting of significant works like Chua Mia Tee's National Language Class (1959) and Lai Kui Fang's Bedok Flood (1959).

Marco Hsü's 1963 book, A Brief History of Malayan Art, would discuss the "vibrant young artists" from EAS in Chapter Fourteen, documenting their ideological output by including detailed citations from the Society's exhibition catalogues.

=== Decline and disbanding ===
After Singapore's separation from Malaysia in 1965 and the establishment of Singapore as an independent nation, the leftist ideals of social realist art did not align well with the People's Action Party-led government, which focussed on controlling political expression as part of its nation-building drive. The state instead encouraged artworks that reflected neutral subject matter like the Singapore River, Chinatown, and Samsui women, and was also supportive of modern abstract art in Singapore, as seen with the formation of the Modern Art Society in 1964.

Despite a long history of woodcut practices in Singapore, it was only in 1966 that the first post-war woodcut exhibition was held, with the Six Men Show held at the National Library Lecture Hall. Yet, the social realist art style in Singapore declined from the 1970s onward, and the Equator Art Society disbanded by the mid-1970s, de-registering on 11 January 1974.

By the time the society de-registered on 11 January 1974, the EAS had held 6 exhibitions at locations including the Victoria Memorial Hall, the Chinese Chamber of Commerce, and its premises at 56 Lorong 32 in Geylang.

== In art history and exhibitions ==
Texts from EAS catalogues were cited in Chapter Fourteen of Marco Hsü's 1963 book A Brief History of Malayan Art, archiving the society's writings. The EAS' activity would also be written about in Channels & Confluences: A History of Singapore Art, a publication produced alongside the opening of the Singapore Art Museum in 1996.

It would also take several decades after the 1966 woodcut show before another major show featuring the technique would happen, with the Singapore History Museum exhibition History Through Prints: Woodblock Prints in Singapore held in 1998.

In 2004, artist Koh Nguang How initiated the project titled Errata: Page 71, Plate 47. Image caption. Change Year: 1950 to Year: 1959; Reported September 2004 by Koh Nguang How. Held at p-10, it begins by identifying a dating error in a caption for Chua Mia Tee's National Language Class in Kwok Kian Chow's book Channels & Confluences: A History of Singapore Art.

In 2007, the exhibition From Words to Pictures: Art During the Emergency was held at the Singapore Art Museum, examining social realist artworks in Singapore through the historical frame of the Malayan Emergency. In 2013, the former members of EAS held the exhibition 137km North of the Equator: A Story of the Equator Art Society and Realist Artists in Singapore at Artcommune Gallery.

With the opening of the National Gallery Singapore in 2015, artworks produced by EAS members would be featured in the inaugural exhibition at the Singapore Gallery, Siapa Nama Kamu? Art in Singapore since the 19th Century.

== Art ==
=== Portraiture and social realist paintings ===
The Equator Art Society often represented familiar social groups in Singapore, influenced by realist artists such as Gustave Courbet and Auguste Rodin from Europe, as well as Ilya Repin from Russia.

One of the most well-known social realist paintings from the EAS is Chua Mia Tee's National Language Class (1959), a work interpreted as a reflection of emerging nationalist identity, with Malay language uniting the various ethnic communities. The painting depicts Singaporeans of different ethnicities trying to free themselves from the colonial language of English by learning Malay, the national language of Singapore, Malaya, and the Malay World. They are seated at a round table as a symbol of equality, and the Malay teacher poses two simple questions to his students on the chalkboard: Siapa nama kamu? Di-mana awak tinggal? (What is your name? Where do you live?). These simple questions are loaded with political symbolism, illustrating a time when Malay language was a socially shared language and major medium of communication in Singapore in the late 1950s and early 1960s. Then, in preparation for Singapore's merger with Malaya, left-wing Chinese school students made demands to study Malay language instead of English at their Chinese medium schools.

=== Woodcut prints ===
Lim Yew Kuan, After the Fire (Bukit Ho Swee), circa 1966, woodblock print on paper, 62.5 x 48.4 cm, Collection of National Gallery Singapore.

Apart from portraiture painting, the woodcut movement in the 1950s was significant in the history of social realism. Woodcut's popularity could be traced back to ideas from the woodcut movement from China, propagated by Lu Xun. Woodcut prints were accessible and could be disseminated through magazines and newspapers, raising awareness of sociopolitical issues outside of art galleries. For example, the woodblock print 13th May Incident (1954) by Choo Cheng Kwan depicted policemen ordered by the colonial administration to use force to disperse protesting Chinese middle school students who were against the National Service Ordinance.

Lim Yew Kuan's After the Fire (Bukit Ho Swee) (1966) depicts the aftermath of a fire, a common occurrence in Singapore estates such as Tiong Bahru and Havelock Road, with one of the most serious being the Bukit Ho Swee Fire of 1961.
