= Ceno2 =

Singaporean street artist

- Born: Mohammad Azlan Ramlan; 1982 (age 43–44)
- Education: Nanyang Academy of Fine Arts
- Style: Street art
- Website: Ceno2 on Instagram

Mohammad Azlan Ramlan (born 1982), known professionally as Ceno2, is a Singaporean graffiti artist. He is one of the few household names in the Singaporean street-art scene.

== Career ==
Ceno2 started drawing at a young age before moving on to oil painting. His interest in graffiti started about 11 years old when his father painted a Mickey Mouse mural in his room. After his GCE O level, he studied Western painting at Nanyang Academy of Fine Arts. His first break came at 18, when he was invited by Popular Bookstore to paint at its Bras Basah Complex branch. He pursued graffiti full time after completing his national service.

In 2017, Ceno2 was featured in the Channel NewsAsia series, Unusual Suspects: The Outsiders, about Singaporeans who are not household names but are known in other countries.
