= Mohammad Din Mohammad =

Singaporean artist (1955–2007)

Mohammad Din Mohammad محمد دین محمد
- Born: 24 May 1955; Kampung Gangsa, Durian Tunggal, Malacca, British Malaya (now Malaysia)
- Died: 2007 (aged 52); Singapore
- Education: Nanyang Academy of Fine Arts
- Known for: Painting, Assemblage, Islamic calligraphy, Mysticism, Silat, Sufism
- Movement: Modern art, contemporary art

Mohammad Din Mohammad (24 May 1955–2007) was a Singaporean Malay artist known for his works inspired by Sufism, with his artistic practice spanning painting, assemblage, and Islamic calligraphy. Mhd Din's works are also heavily influenced by his devotion to the practice of the Malay martial arts called silat. He was also a practising bomoh or traditional healer.

== Education and personal life ==
Born in Kampung Gangsa in Malacca, Malaysia, Mhd Din's family migrated to Singapore when he was two years old. As a boy he was interested in art, experimenting in ceramics, making clay cups at the age of five. Formal education for Malay youths, meant the study of traditional art forms at the time. At the age of 12, Mhd Din began to learn silat, traditional massage and herbal healing techniques. In 1973, Mhd Din went on to study art at the Nanyang Academy of Fine Arts (NAFA), majoring in western painting, where he took to the Realist portrait painting style. Mhd Din was married to fellow artist Hamidah Jalil.

== Career ==
After graduating from NAFA in 1976 he began his life as an artist plying old Bugis Street drawing portraits for tourists and travellers. This went on for the next 5 years. In 1980, Mhd Din began acting in Malay theatre, with his first role as the character Laertees in a Malay adaptation of Hamlet by the Malay arts group Perkumpulan Seni. He also acted in a Singapore drama serial, Jejak Kembara (The Wanderer) in April 1980.

In 1983, a motorcycle accident in Pontian nearly resulted in the amputation of Mhd Din's ankle. Although doctors managed to join the ankle in place through an operation, gangrene set in soon after. Ignoring his doctor's pleas to amputate, Mhd Din sought treatment from his silat master Pak Hamin Bujang. After two years of intense treatment, he was able to walk and perform silat again. He became a strong believer in traditional Malay medicine, and went on to study and practice traditional healing techniques.

In the 1990s, Mhd Din began to develop “The Mystical Approach,” a wide-ranging theory that sought to understand the sources of the different shapes and forms in the world. He studied rigorously and traveled extensively across Malaysia and Indonesia, relying on Sufism as a vehicle to explore the multiple meanings associated with Southeast Asian objects. His aim was to develop artworks that could enhance the emotional and physical well-being of those who encountered them. He saw his artworks as a form of preventive medicine, and the people who engaged with them as his patients.

Mhd Din and his wife and fellow artist, Hamidah Jalil collected hundreds of Southeast Asian cultural artefacts. These ranged from Kris and Wayang kulit to rare coins, Malay medicinal manuscripts, and textiles. Mhd Din often drew from these materials in his works, which he also intended to operate as vehicles for navigating the social and economic pressures of modern life.

In 1999, Mhd Din and his friend Ahmad Zakii Anwar began learning calligraphy from an Iranian master. This formal training led Mhd Din to incorporate the science of Arabic letters in his work, marking a shift in his art. He explored the 28 Arabic letters as expressions of the Sufi mystic’s longing for love and beauty in the world. This search, combined with Mhd Din’s practice of silat, made his calligraphy unique. Describing this approach as “Calligraphic Energy,” Mhd Din mixed acrylic, texture paste and gel directly on the canvas using his hands to render bold Arabic alphabets from chapters (surah) of the Quran. By eschewing the paintbrush in favour of painting with his bare hands, he adapted the silat technique of channeling inner energy through bodily movements.

From 1978 till 2006, Mhd Din's artworks were featured in 20 solo exhibitions locally and overseas, such as People and Landscape, shown across Singapore, Malaysia, and Indonesia in 1978; Wishy and Washy in 1980; Memories of South East Asia, shown across Singapore, Malaysia, and Indonesia in 1983; Mystical and Talismanic Energy in 1994; Flora and Foliate in 1997; Inspiration Mystique at Paris, France in 2000; Paris Experiences in 2000; Zikr – Hands on Calligraphy at Malaysia in 2000; Towards Self-Unification at Paris, France in 2001; Experience and Memories at Turkey in 2003; Flowers and BMW Cars at Hong Kong in 2004. His work was also posthumously exhibited for Mystical Manoeuvre in Malaysia in 2007. Mhd Din was also a member of the Modern Art Society of Singapore.

Following his death, his family opened a gallery in 2008, Galeri Mohammad Din Mohammad, in Malacca, Malaysia to commemorate his art and life. His practice was posthumously featured in the exhibition Archives and Desires: Selections from the Mohammad Din Mohammad Collection (2008) at the NUS Museum and curated by Shabbir Hussain Mustafa. In 2021, Mhd Din's practice was featured in the National Gallery Singapore exhibition Something New Must Turn Up: Six Singaporean Artists After 1965, with his solo section titled The Mistaken Ancestor, after his 1994 assemblage of the same name.

== Art and mysticism ==
Mhd Din is best remembered for his provocative paintings and assemblages, which combines a wide variety of influences. Above all, his artworks signify the complex flows that make up Malay mysticism. His art, especially his calligraphy paintings and assemblages are deeply rooted in Sufi mysticism, which he practiced throughout his life. Through his art, Mhd Din sought to "stitch" together his beliefs, and life philosophies into a common entity—an artwork that is "an assembly of separated body and soul".
