= Chua Mia Tee =

Singaporean painter (1931–2026)

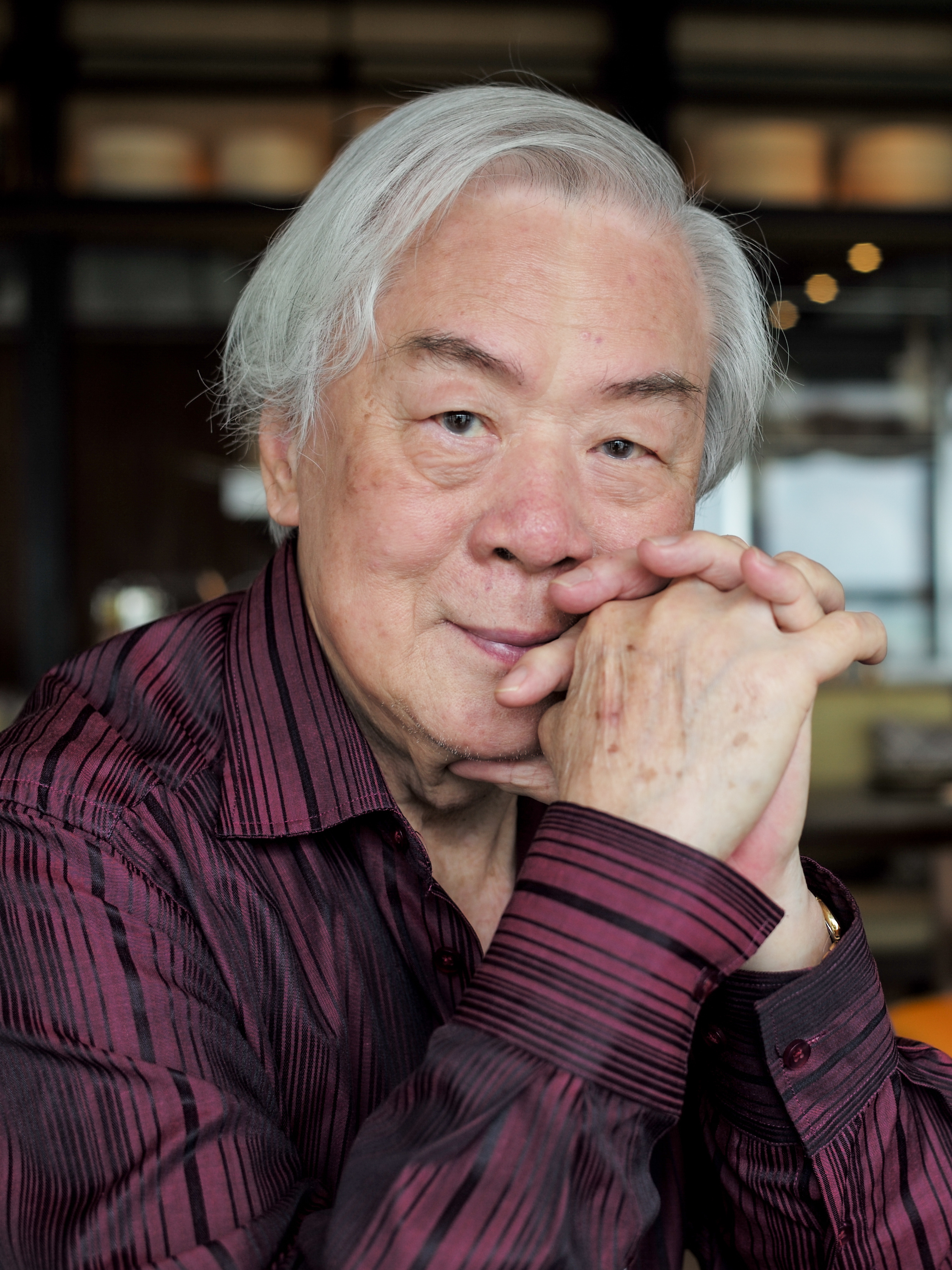
- Chua in 2018
- Born: 25 November 1931; Shantou, Guangdong Province, Republic of China
- Died: 10 July 2026 (aged 94); Bukit Timah, Singapore
- Education: Nanyang Academy of Fine Arts
- Occupation: Painter
- Spouse: Lee Boon Ngan
- Children: 1 son, 1 daughter
- Relatives: Lee Boon Yang (brother-in-law); Lee Boon Wang (brother-in-law)

Chua Mia Tee (Note: Chinese: 蔡名智; pinyin: Cài Míngzhì; Pe̍h-ōe-jī: Chhòa Miâ-tì) (25 November 1931 – 10 July 2026) was a Chinese-born Singaporean artist known for his social realist oil paintings capturing the social and political conditions of Singapore and Malaya in the 1950s and 1960s. Chua was involved in the Equator Art Society, an artist group founded in 1956 whose social realist works sought to instil a distinct Malayan consciousness by representing the realities and struggles of the masses. For his contributions to the visual arts in Singapore, Chua was awarded the Cultural Medallion in 2015.

Chua was also known for his depictions of historic events and portrait paintings of prominent Singaporeans and political figures, such as the nation's presidents and ministers. This includes, for instance, a sculpted bust of composer Zubir Said, and Chua's 1998 portrait of Singapore's first president Yusof Ishak, which is reproduced on Singaporean banknotes.

His work had been exhibited internationally in countries such as Australia, Belgium, Germany, Indonesia, New Zealand, and Thailand, and his paintings are in the collection of the National Gallery Singapore, including his most notable work, National Language Class (1959).

== Early life and education ==
Chua was born on 25 November 1931 in Shantou, Guangdong, China. In 1937, at the age of six, Chua and his family fled the Sino-Japanese War in China, coming to Singapore. For his primary education, he attended the Shuqun School and subsequently Tuan Mong School. His studies would be temporarily interrupted by the Japanese occupation of Singapore, with his family moving to Indonesia until 1945, when he returned to Singapore with the end of World War II and completed his primary school studies at Tuan Mong School in 1946.

While growing up, Chua would watch his father, a self-taught painter who was a businessman, draw portraits of his grandparents, leading to Chua's discovery of his own interest in sketching and painting. While Chua enrolled in Chung Cheng High School for secondary education in 1947, he left midway to pursue a formal arts education at the Nanyang Academy of Fine Arts (NAFA), Singapore, encouraged by his father. There, academy director Lim Hak Tai and artists Cheong Soo Pieng, Koh Tong Leong and See Hiang To would be some of his teachers.

He graduated from NAFA in 1952 and taught there as a full-time teacher for two years before returning to Chung Cheng High School to complete his secondary education. He would then return to NAFA as an art teacher once again.

== Career ==
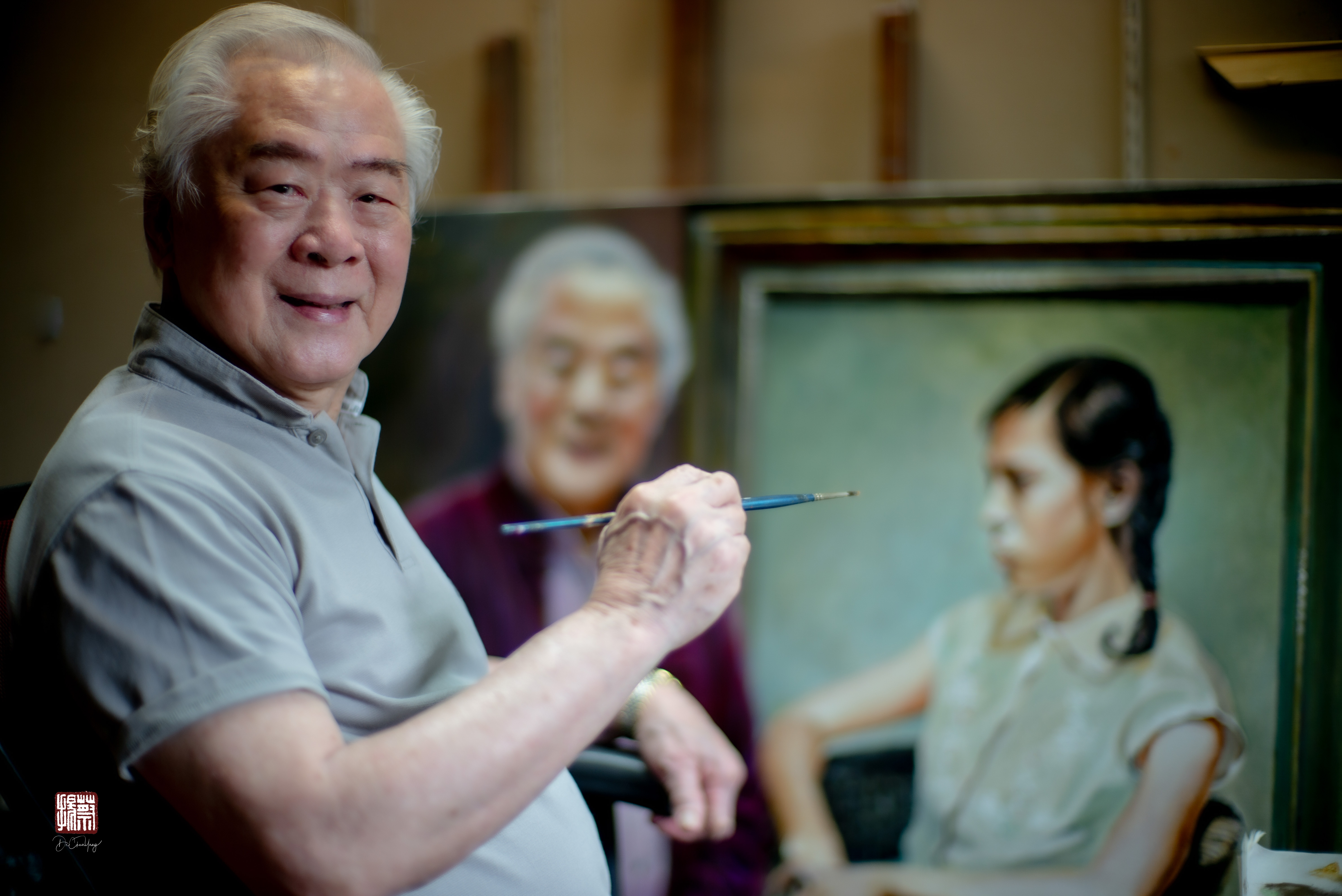
Chua completes his last painting, "Reunited", in April 2021

In 1956, an art association comprising students from local Chinese middle schools, the Singapore Chinese Middle Schools' Graduates of 1953 Arts Association (SCMSGAA), held a travelling fundraising exhibition. Raising funds for building Singapore's only Chinese-language private university, Nanyang University (later merged to become the present-day National University of Singapore), the association first exhibited at the Chinese Chamber of Commerce in Singapore, and later in Kuala Lumpur and Penang. At this travelling exhibition, Chua would present his now well-known oil painting, Epic Poem of Malaya (1955), a work that embodies the desire to inculcate a distinct Malayan nationalism in the younger generation.

However, the SCMSGAA would be dissolved after the travelling exhibition due to their perceived left-leaning politics and anti-colonial sentiment, and a new group called the Equator Art Society would be registered the same year in 1956. Comprising many of the members of the SCMSGAA, the Equator Art Society was an artist group promoting the use of realist-style painting and socially-engaged practices that commented on social issues in 1950s and 60s Singapore and Malaya. Chua would be involved in the Equator Art Society's exhibitions, presenting paintings such as National Language Class (1959), for example, at the group's 1960 exhibition. By the society's de-registering on 11 January 1974, the EAS had held 6 exhibitions at locations including the Victoria Memorial Hall, the Chinese Chamber of Commerce, and its premises at 56 Lorong 32 in Geylang.

Chua would simultaneously develop his practice through his involvement with commercial art, becoming an illustrator at the Shanghai Book Company from 1957 and later working as a designer with Grant Advertising International from 1960. Afterwards from 1965, Chua would work as a book designer and illustrator the Times Organisation's Federal Publication. In 1974, Chua held his first solo exhibition of his social realist paintings at the Rising Art Gallery, with the attention garnered leading to his decision to be a full-time artist at the age of 43.

In 1979, Chua would be commissioned to create 36 sketches of members of parliament and ministers during parliamentary meetings. He would continue to be commissioned to paint political figures such as then Senior Minister Lee Kuan Yew in 1991 as a May Day gift from the National Trades Union Congress, and historic events such as The Opening of the 8th Parliament for the Parliament of Singapore in 1992. Chua's 1998 portrait of Singapore's first president Yusof Ishak, for instance, can be found reproduced on Singapore's currency notes.

He would show his work in solo and group shows from the 1980s onwards, also holding joint exhibitions in 1980 and 1990 with oil painter Lee Boon Ngan, his wife.

In 1996, with the inauguration of the Singapore Art Museum, Chua's work would also be historicised in Channels & Confluences: A History of Singapore Art, a publication produced alongside the museum's opening. In 2007, the exhibition From Words to Pictures: Art During the Emergency would be held at the Singapore Art Museum, a show examining social realist artworks in Singapore through the historical frame of the Malayan Emergency, including works by Chua. In 2013, the former members of EAS held the exhibition 137km North of the Equator: A Story of the Equator Art Society and Realist Artists in Singapore at the Artcommune Gallery. With the opening of the National Gallery Singapore in 2015, Chua's work would be featured in and inspire the title of the inaugural exhibition at the Singapore Gallery, Siapa Nama Kamu? Art in Singapore since the 19th Century, its name taking from a detail in his oil painting, National Language Class (1959).

In 2015, Chua was awarded the Cultural Medallion for his contributions to the visual arts in Singapore.

== Art and influence ==
Chua's oil painting National Language Class (1959) depicts Singaporeans of different ethnicities learning Malay—the national language of Singapore, Malaya, and the Malay World—to free themselves from English, the language of their colonial rulers. In preparation for merger with Malaya, left-wing Chinese school students at the time demanded to study Malay instead of English at their Chinese medium schools. The painting reflects this emerging Malayan national identity, with Malay language uniting different ethnic communities. Seated at a round table, which symbolizes equality, the Malay teacher poses two questions to his students: "Siapa nama kamu? Di-mana awak tinggal?" ("What is your name? Where do you live?"). These seemingly simple questions are loaded with political symbolism, illustrating the importance of Malay language as a social bridge and main means of communicating in Singapore during the late 1950s and early 1960s.

Chua's art has inspired many other artists. For example, Koh Buck Song, the National Gallery Singapore's poet-in-residence 2021–22, in his book of poems and haiga art, the world anew (2023), has a poem titled "industry" that responds to Chua's painting Workers in a Canteen (1974), as well as a haiga artwork titled "racial harmony" inspired by Chua's painting Eating on Banana Leaves (1979).

== Personal life and death ==
Chua married Lee Boo Ngan (1939–2017) in 1961. They had two children, Chua Hong and Chua Yang. He died from pneumonia at his home in Bukit Timah in Singapore, on 10 July 2026, at the age of 94. He had previously suffered a stroke in 2021.
