= Carrigaline Pottery =

Irish pottery business

Carrigaline Pottery was a pottery business founded by Hodder Walworth Blacker Roberts (1878–1952), of Mount Rivers, Carrigaline, in Carrigaline, County Cork, Ireland, in 1928. Its products bear the marks Carrigaline Pottery or Carrig Ware. For much of middle of the 20th century the pottery was the main source of employment in Carrigaline. It made its name in part by producing memorabilia for the 1932 Eucharistic Congress and subsequent commemorative and souvenir items. In the 1970s the company suffered from financial difficulties going first into receivership, and then closing in 1979.

Ng Eng Teng, the Singaporean sculptor, worked in the mid-1960s at the Pottery as a designer of tiles, hollow-ware and tableware.

A commemorative bronze sculpture, representing some of the wares produced by the pottery, was unveiled in Carrigaline in 2021.
