= Anthony Poon =

Singaporean artist (1945–2006)

- 方谨顺
- Born: Poon Kin Soon; 21 April 1945; Singapore
- Died: 2 September 2006 (aged 61); Singapore
- Education: Nanyang Academy of Fine Arts; Bynam Shaw School of Art, London
- Known for: Oil painting, sculpture
- Notable work: Wave Series paintings; sculptures
- Movement: Abstract
- Awards: 2004: Ministry of Culture of P.R. China and the People’s Municipal Government of Beijing. Sculpture Competition, Housing and Development Board. Singapore; 2002: Excellence Prize, China International City Exhibition & Symposium, Beijing; 1999: Sculpture Competition, Ministry of Information and the Arts; 1998: Sculpture Competition, Singapore Turf Club; 1997:Sculpture Competition, United Engineers Square; 1991: 1990 Cultural Medallion Award, Government of Singapore; 1987: Second Prize, Sentosa Waterfront Sculpture Competition; 1986: Kallang Theatre Mural Competition, Ministry of Culture; 1983: First Prize, United Overseas Bank (UOB) Painting of the Year; 1976: Pingat Apad Award, Association of Artists of various Resources

Anthony Poon Kin Soon (simplified Chinese: 方谨顺; traditional Chinese: 方謹順; pinyin: Fāng Jǐn Shùn; 21 April 1945 – 2 September 2006) was one of the pioneer abstract artists in Singapore best known for his paintings in the Wave Series which he began working on in 1976.

== Biography ==
Born in Singapore in 1945, Poon graduated from the Nanyang Academy of Fine Arts (NAFA) in 1964, and held his first exhibition at the old National Library. He pursued further studies at Bynam Shaw School of Art in London in 1968 on a Lee Foundation study grant as well as a scholarship from the school. Upon graduation he return to Singapore in 1971.

His earliest foray into the Singapore art scene upon his return, was with the Alpha Gallery. It was a new gallery set up at the 7 Alexandra Avenue address, by the prominent architect Datuk Lim Chong Keat. With the guidance of the gallery's first manager Khoo Sui Hoe, a young artist like Poon could develop his art and have regular exhibitions at the gallery. Poon later took over from Khoo to become the gallery manager between 1973 and 1978.

== Aesthetics of Poon's art ==
It was during the late 1970s that he produced the Wave Series, abandoning the shaped canvas for the square frame, although order and symmetry remained the operative logic. This was followed by the Frequency series in the early 1980s, a truncated variant of the wave motif. Here, the illusion of three-dimensionality emerged as an interest of his. He also explored chromatic ranges in the Colour Theory series during this period.

Here, abstraction was the predominant form of expression, although Poon deferred in being more conceptual, analytical and controlled as compared to his contemporaries. His early works, although containing figurations instructive of the formal teachings of NAFA, already showed signs of semi-abstraction. He quickly developed a unique style, centred on his interest in the spatial relationship between line and colour. This was evident in the Kite series of geometric abstractions and aerodynamic shapes on shaped canvas, developed just before his return to Singapore. He then expanded fully into the third dimension in the mid-1980s, with the Wave relief marking his progress into three-dimensions on canvas.

Sculptural works followed in the early 1990s, allowing for an interactive play of volume and void to form. His sculptures told of his meticulous slant towards precision, which were a creative engineering feat of geometrical shapes.

== Career ==
More than 20 of his works can be seen throughout Singapore, from the Singapore Turf Club to the National Library, Ministry of Information and the Arts, and the HDB Hub. Public collections can also be seen overseas in Brunei, Beijing and Washington, D.C. In 2002, Poon's five-metre-high stainless steel sculpture Success represented Singapore in an international exhibition of 230 new sculptures held at the City Sculpture Park in Beijing, China. His work was chosen by China's Ministry of Culture in Singapore for the Olympic Games in 2008. Even after being diagnosed with lung cancer he continued to work, completing a sculpture for the Beijing 2008 Olympics shortly before he died.

I would like to end my life with a paint brush in my hand.

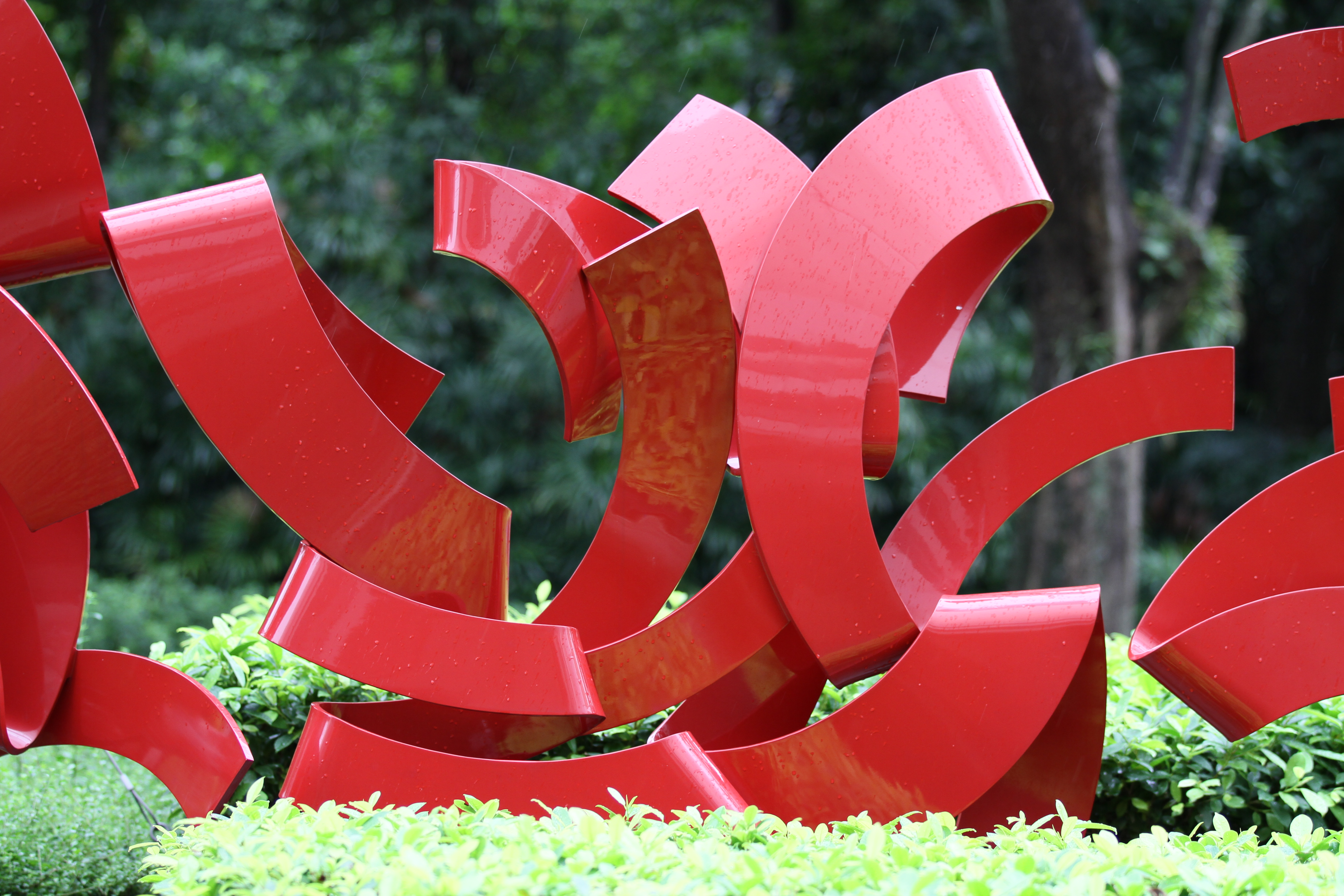
One of Poon's four Sense Surround sculptures (2006), which were commissioned by and installed outside the St. Regis Singapore

Poon sat on the specialist panels of many art advisory boards, including the Singapore National Arts Council. He was also a member of the Third Singapore Note and Coin Advisory Committee, assisting in the design of new currency notes and coins. In 1990, he was awarded the Cultural Medallion for Art, Singapore's highest award for those achieving artistic excellence.

== Personal life ==
Poon was known in the art world for his professionalism and discipline. His close friend and fellow artist Teo Eng Seng said, "He was a good example of a successful artist. People tend to think that artists are not organised, but Anthony was highly organised, highly competent." Friends of Poon also remembered him as a food lover. Teo remembered fondly that his friend was always urging fellow artists to try new places to eat, even if the places were out of the way. Poon would drive his friends around to different eating locations every day, sometimes even driving five kilometres just to try a new place. Then he would order a lot of different dishes and tell everyone to eat as much as they could.

Poon died from lung cancer on 2 September 2006 at 3:50 a.m., aged 61. Following his death, and in accordance with his last wishes, 23 of his works – three sculptures, two three-dimensional relief paintings and 18 paintings – were donated to the Singapore Art Museum, joining the 16 pieces already in the museum's collection. These works were chosen to "fill in the gaps" in the existing collection so that it would span his entire body of work from the 1960s until 2005.
