= Ang Ah Tee =

Singaporean painter

- Born: November 11, 1942 (age 83)
- Citizenship: Singaporean
- Awards: Cultural Medallion
- Website: angahtee.sg

Ang Ah Tee (born 11 November 1943) is a Singaporean painter. He received the Cultural Medallion in 2009.

== Education ==
Ang Ah Tee was born in Singapore on 11 November 1943. Ang attended afternoon art class in addition to his formal classes, holding a curiosity about art. He studied at the Nanyang Academy of Fine Arts from 1960 to 1962. His teachers at the academy included artists Georgette Chen and Cheong Soo Pieng, who were both pioneers of the Nanyang Style.

== Career ==
After graduating, he was employed at the Port Authority of Singapore as a clerk, painting in his spare time, using watercolour and oil. In 1974, he won the Open Art Competition organised by the Port Authority of Singapore. He participated in a group exhibition in the Singapore Chinese Chamber of Commerce and Industry in the same year. In 1976, he went on a trip to various places across Asia, such as Bali and Malacca, to obtain inspiration for his art. In 1977, he left his job to become a full-time artist. In his initial years as an artist, he was supported by Della Butcher, who held art galleries.

In 1978, Ang transitioned from using oil and watercolour to using acrylic for his artwork. He held his first solo exhibition in the Mandarin Hotel in 1980. In 1981, he went on a trip where he visited various places in the world, such as London, Egypt and China, painting various landmarks. In 2001, he won the first prize at the Dr Tan Tsze Chor Art Awards Competition. In 2009, he was nationally recognised, receiving the Cultural Medallion for his contributions to visual arts in Singapore.

== Personal life ==
Ang is married and has a son.
