= City Charter Schools =

Public charter schools in Los Angeles, California

City Charter Schools were a set of three public charter schools in the Los Angeles metropolitan area. Founded by parents on the Westside of Los Angeles, the network previously operated the elementary school City Language Immersion Charter, the middle school The City School, and City High School.

Following the closure of City High School in 2016 and The City School in 2023, City Charter Schools partnered with New Los Angeles Charter Schools to ensure continuing operations for City Language Immersion Charter. New Los Angeles Charter Schools now runs New Los Angeles Elementary School, New Los Angeles Middle School, and the City Language Immersion Charter.

== History ==
In 2015, City High School opened on the campus of Los Angeles High School. This followed attempts by Los Angeles Unified School District employees to get the school to co-locate with Emerson Middle School, which were opposed by some Emerson parents looking to boost enrollment for their traditional LAUSD school. After a new girls' school opened at Los Angeles High School, City High School rejected the option of co-locating at Susan Miller Dorsey High School and instead relocated to a space in a nearby synagogue. The school closed in September 2016, as enrollment declines had made renting at the synagogue unsustainable.
