= Ong Kim Seng =

Singaporean artist (born 1945)

Ong Kim Seng (王金成)
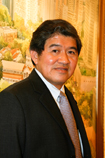
- Born: 10 June 1945 (age 81); Singapore
- Education: Self-taught
- Known for: Watercolour
- Spouse: Nam Ah Moy (1970-2025)
- Children: 3
- Awards: Various; See awards
- Website: www.ongkimseng.com

Ong Kim Seng (Chinese: 王金成; Pe̍h-ōe-jī: Ông Kim-sêng; pinyin: Wáng Jīnchéng) is a self-taught Singaporean watercolor artist. Since 1985, he has participated in group and solo exhibitions at Singapore and in the United States, China, United Kingdom, Japan, Australia, Belgium, Federal Republic of Germany, France, Middle East, Taiwan, Hong Kong, and the ASEAN countries.

Ong is the first and only Singaporean to have won six awards by the American Watercolor Society (AWS), whose membership he received in 1992. He is also the only Asian artist outside the US to be admitted into AWS.

== Early life ==
An only child, Ong grew up in a kampung in Tiong Bahru under the care of his mother, Goh Choon Hoon. His father had died in 1952 when he was still young. To support the family, his mother worked as a washerwoman and grass cutter to put her son through school. Ong studied at Radin Mas Primary School in 1959 and later on at Pasir Panjang Secondary School. Ong had shown an interest in art since he was young but his mother had envisioned him becoming either a clerk or teacher with his education, than to have the ludicrous thought of becoming an artist. He began experimenting with painting, beginning with pastels and oil and moving onto watercolour painting in earnest since 1960. He then became a regular participant in a painting group at the Singapore River led by an artist, writer and lecturer Chia Wai Hon.

Ong left school in 1962 and after that joined an advertising agency where he worked as a bill collector. He left the agency after four years and found his next job as a policeman at the British Naval Base in Sembawang. He lost his job in 1971 when the British withdrew their troops from Singapore. He subsequently worked as a welder at Pulau Bukom, a line technician at an electronics firm, National Semiconductor, and an audio-visual/graphic technician at the Colombo Plan Staff College for Technician Education. In his working life, he had never stopped painting.

In 1974, Ong got his first opportunity to present his watercolor artworks at a group show with artists Wan Soon Kam and Tan Jeuy Lee at the Meyer Gallery, organised by gallery owner and arts patron Della Butcher. During this period, Ong also won first in the Port of Singapore Authority Artists' Encouragement Scheme Art Competition. This major break led the Maritime Museum to commissioned Ong to paint 'Historical Vessel' (Vessels owned by the East India Company voyaging to Singapore). This was the beginning of Ong's career as an artist whereby he started being more reputable in the art scene.

When the College relocated to Manila in 1986, Ong decided to become a full-time professional artist in spite of having to care for an elderly mother, and being married with a wife and three children in tow.

== Ong and his art ==
Ong is a self-taught artist, who never had any formal art training. As a realist painter, his works focus on inanimate objects, architectural form, masonry, foliage and landscape. His style is "naturalist cum impressionistic", which is "a combination of post-impressionist colour and the outlook of the American realist masters". He has held numerous solo and group exhibitions in the past three decades, had his works published by local and international publishers, and appeared on local arts television programmes.

In 1993 his work 'Bhaktaphur' was the first Singapore watercolour painting to be auctioned by Sotheby's in Hong Kong. In March 1994, his work 'Bali' was auctioned by Christie's in Singapore. His works are now auctioned annually in Singapore and in the region.

Ong's works have appeared in eight books by publishers in America, China and Singapore, including his Cultural Medallion project book Heartlands: Home And Nation In The Art Of Ong Kim Seng (2008). He was Founding Editor-South East Asia for International Artist and an article on his works appeared in the first issue of the magazine in June 1998. His artwork can be found in the Singapore Art Museum, Neka Museum in Bali, Maritime Museum in Sentosa and the Hawk Gallery in Oregon, US.

== Auction history ==
On 3 April 2017, Ong Kim Seng set a new personal record when his work was sold for HK$725,000 (S$130,540) at a Sotheby's Hong Kong auction. The acrylic on canvas painting, titled Nepal, fetched Ong his highest price in an international auction. It was sold to an Asian private collector.

His works of a similar scale tend to sell for a maximum of about $40,000. The painting is based on a street scene in Bhaktapur, a city in Nepal. Ong is fond of the country and had visited it yearly in the early 2000s. The work sold for double the pre-sale estimate of auction house Sotheby's after a contest involving about five bidders.

Mr Mok Kim Chuan, head of the modern and contemporary South- east Asian art department in Sotheby's, says Ong's larger format works, especially those on canvas, "are not often seen in the open market". "The scarcity of the work, of course in addition to the quality of the work, attracted interest and participation, with collectors wanting to seize the opportunity to acquire the work from one of Singapore's key artists," he adds.

Ms Ma Peiyi, senior curator at Artcommune gallery in Singapore, which represents Ong, says this record price does not come as a surprise.

== Exhibitions ==
Ong has participated in several major exhibitions including:

=== The Art of Ong Kim Seng ===
The Art of Ong Kim Seng was Ong's first solo exhibition. It took place in ElleSix Gallery, Malaysia, and showcased about 30 of his works in his first Malaysian solo exhibition. It showcased his most memorable paintings that have spanned over 36 years of his career as an artist and traveller. His collectors include Queen Elizabeth II of the United Kingdom, the Prime Minister of the People's Republic of China and the Secretary-General of the United Nations among other notable people.

=== Moments of Light ===
Moments of Light was Ong's second solo exhibition, and showcased his works in monotypes, lithographs, paper pulp paintings and watercolours. It took from 29 September – 14 November 2004 at the Singapore Tyler Print Institute.

=== Timeless Jiangnan ===
Timeless Jiangnan was a joint exhibition between Ong and photographer Kwek Leng Joo. It was held at the Singapore Conference Hall in September 2005.

Material Moves: Revisiting Print and Paper through Han Sai Por, Goh Beng Kwan, Ong Kim Seng and Chua Ek Kay

Material Moves, held on occasion of Singapore’s 60th year of independence (SG60), the exhibition celebrates the remarkable contributions of these artists – all of whom are Cultural Medallion recipients – in shaping the country’s art scene throughout their storied careers. The exhibition runs from 16 August to 5 October 2025.

Showcasing 53 works on paper, specially created for this exhibition in collaboration with STPI during their latest residencies in 2024, octogenarians Han, Goh and Ong will present brand new works inspired by their native Singapore but rendered in unexpected contexts. Continuing the theme of material innovations, Ong uses mulberry bark ‘paper’ to paint renderings of old or disappearing street scenes in Singapore, recovered from his own recollections.

== Selected publications ==
- Heartlands: Home And Nation In The Art Of Ong Kim Seng. 2008. Text & poems by Koh Buck Song. With an exhibition at the Singapore Art Museum. ISBN 978-981-08-1618-6.

== Awards ==
Ong has won nine awards from the American Watercolor Society; the Paul B. Remmy Memorial Award in 1983, the Lucy B. Moore Award in 1988, the Clara Stroud Memorial Award in 1989 and the Barse Miller Memorial Award in 1992, Winsor & Newton Award in 2000 and the Ida Wells Memorial Award in 2001. He has been an active member of the society since 1990 and was the first Asian outside the US to be awarded membership. After having won five of its awards, Kim Seng was made a Dolphin Fellow of the AWS in 2000.

In 1990, he was awarded the Cultural Medallion for visual arts by the President of the Republic of Singapore. The Cultural Medallion is administered by the Ministry of Information, Communications and the Arts. He was conferred as Dolphin Fellowship in 2000. He won the Excellence for Singapore Award presented by the Singapore Totaliser Board in 2000. He was also awarded the Singapore Internationale by the Singapore International Foundation in 2001. His most recent award is the 2001 Arts Supporter Award presented by the National Arts Council.

He has also received many other less significant awards. They include:

- 1974 - First Prize, Port of Singapore Authority Encouragement Scheme Open Art Competition
- 1983 - Paul B. Remmy AWS Memorial Award, American Watercolour Society, New York, USA
- 1988 - Lucy B. Moore Memorial Award, American Watercolour Society, New York, USA
- 1989 - Clara Stroud Memorial Award, American Watercolour Society, New York, USA
- 1990 - Cultural Medallion (Visual Arts), Ministry of Information and the Arts, Singapore
- 1992 - Barse Miller Memorial Award, American Watercolour Society, New York, USA
- 2000 - Winsor & Newton Award, American Watercolour Society, New York, USA
- 2000 - Conferred the Dolphin Fellow by American Watercolour Society, New York, USA
- 2000 - Excellence for Singapore Award, Singapore Totalisator Board
- 2001 - Singapore Internationale Award, Singapore International Foundation
- 2001 - Ida Wells Memorial Award, American Watercolour Society, New York, USA
- 2001 - Supporter of the Arts Award conferred by the National Arts Council
- 2003 - Silver Award, National Watercolour Exhibition of the People’s Republic of China, Fuzhou, China
- 2010 - Winsor & Newton Award, American Watercolour Society, New York, USA
- 2010 - Friend of Heritage Award, National Heritage Board, Singapore
- 2014 - Master of ASEAN Watercolourist at the World Watermedia Exposition, Thailand
- 2015 - Frederick Wong Award, American Watercolour Society, New York, USA
- 2017 - Top 25 Watercolour Painters in the World, International Watercolour Festival, Greece

== Societies ==
Ong is a signature member of the AWS, and has had his own work selected for the NWS's exhibition in California.

He was also President of the Singapore Watercolour Society from 1991 to 2001 when he became Honorary President, in which that capacity, he interacted with other watercolor organisations in the other parts of the world.

Ong Kim Seng was the Organizing Chairman of Asian Watercolours '97, the first international watercolor exhibition to be held in Singapore. He was also the vice-chairman of Singapore Art '97. He has been an Art Advisor to the National Arts Council since 1998 and is a life Fellow of the National University of Singapore's Centre of the Arts.

== Private life ==
Ong's interests include travelling, trekking, jogging, swimming and cycling. He enjoys meeting people and discovering their way of life. He has gone on travelling-cum-painting expeditions in the past, while "recording vanishing ways of life of exotic places" in his paintings.

Ong has visited the Tianshan region of Sinkiang in China, the Nepalese Himalayas and the Tibetan Plateau many times to paint and to trek.

As an artist himself, he is an avid fan of paintings. His collectors include Queen Elizabeth II of the United Kingdom, the Prime Minister of the People's Republic of China, the Secretary-General of the United Nations, President of the Republic of Korea, Prime Minister of the Kingdom of Thailand, the President of the Republic of the Philippines; the Prime Minister of Japan, the Prime Minister of India; the Governor of Hokkaido; Singapore Arts Museum; Singapore, Maritime Museum, the Agung Rai Museum and Neka Museum in Bali, Indonesia; the Ministry of Foreign Affairs headquarters, Foreign Missions and Embassies of the Republic of Singapore.

Ong is married with three children (Henry, Diane and Dora Ong). His wife is Nam Ah Moy and married for 54 years. She died on 17 January 2025.

== See also ==
- List of painters by name
- Lists of painters
