= Ng Eng Teng =

Singaporean sculptor (1934–2001)

Ng Eng Teng 黄荣庭
- Ng in 1981
- Born: 12 July 1934; Singapore, Straits Settlements
- Died: 4 November 2001 (aged 67); Singapore
- Education: Nanyang Academy of Fine Arts; North Staffordshire College of Technology; Farnham School of Art
- Known for: Contemporary sculpture
- Awards: 1961: Gold Medal, Tagore Centenary Open Painting Competition; 1962: Silver Medal, Nanyang University Open Painting Competition, Singapore; 1974: London British Council Artist Travel Grant to England. Pingat APAD, Association of Artists of Various Resources; 1981: Tan Tsze Chor Medal for Sculpture, Singapore Art Society. Cultural Medallion Award; 1990: ASEAN Cultural Award for Visual Arts; 2001: Montblanc de la Culture Arts Patronage Award

Ng Eng Teng (Chinese: 黄荣庭; pinyin: Huáng Róngtíng; 12 July 1934 – 4 November 2001) was a Singaporean sculptor known for his figurative sculptures, many of which are found in public locations around Singapore. Regarded as the "Grandfather of Singapore Sculpture", his legacy includes the Mother And Child bronze sculpture outside Far East Shopping Centre along Orchard Road, and The Explorer located at the entrance of the Singapore Art Museum. In 1981, his outstanding achievements and contributions to Singapore's art scene garnered him the Cultural Medallion.

== Early life ==
Ng Eng Teng was born in British controlled-Singapore on 12 July 1934, showing an interest in sculpting as a child after playing with plasticine. After graduating from Senior Cambridge examinations in 1955, he took painting and sculpture classes at the British Council with artist Liu Kang in 1958. Ng entered the Nanyang Academy of Fine Arts in that year and showed promise as an aspiring artist, experimenting with art in various media while other students were merely following through the curriculum. In 1959 the young Ng met British sculptor Jean Bullock in Singapore, who exposed him to sculpture art and introduced him to ciment fondu, a relatively new sculpting medium.

At the Academy, his potential also caught the eye of teacher and artist Georgette Chen, and often invited him to her home to discuss about art aesthetics. Whenever he visited her place his attention would fall on the ceramic pieces displayed at her home. It dawned upon Chen that since there were no sculptors in Singapore at that time, Ng's gift with clay and fluency with the English Language, should see him with a great future as a sculptor. She urged him not only to study plastic arts at The Potteries in Stoke-on-Trent in England, she also thought Ng should go to St. Ives and seek out ceramic artist Bernard Leach at his studio. Chen deeply admired Leach and his works.

Ng took heed of her suggestions and left Singapore for The Potteries in Stoke-on-Trent in 1962 upon graduating the Academy. He had read pottery design at the North Staffordshire College of Technology / Stoke-on-Trent College of Art between 1962 and 1963, and with the Farnham School of Art in Surrey, where Ng had spent a year as a research student of ceramics and sculpture in 1964.

== Career ==
=== Applied arts ===
After his graduation from Farnham, Ng worked with the Carrigaline Pottery in County Cork as a designer of tiles, hollow-ware and tableware. His commercial designs were exhibited at the Arts and Crafts Centre of Britain and at various Spring Fairs. Ng was beginning to make a name for himself in the commercial industry, and was even featured in The Irish Press when his designer products became popular with the local market. In 1966, Ng was also awarded with a Diploma by the Society of Industrial Artists and Designers (MSIAD) (now known as the Chartered Society of Designers). But Ng increasingly felt that life in Cork was getting too comfortable, and the work he did was more craft than art. He decided to return home to Singapore to pursue his passion in artistic sculpting.

=== Return to Singapore and artistic career ===
Ng returned to Singapore mainly for three reasons: one was to set up a workshop and embark his ceramic practice teaching pottery-making. The second was due to his concerns for his family and wanting to provide support to them. The third reason was to heed Georgette's plea to her students to come back to help their alma mater, the Academy, and in Ng's mind he thought that he could start a pottery workshop in the Academy - only to find his suggestion rejected by the Academy administration. Ng started his workshop with the help of his father, and first designed a series of works created using slip casting and press moulding, and hoped they can make some money but it was not successful. His financial resources depleted soon and Ng decided to seek employment. Through the recommendation of fellow artist Vincent Hoisington, he found employment with the International Planned Parenthood Federation. Thus in 1968 he joined the Federation, working as a visual aids officer for a year.

Portrait (1988) Size: unknown Medium: Ciment fondu Collection: Olympic Park, Seoul, Korea

The night of September 4, 1970 marked the beginning of his career as a full-time sculptor, with the inception of his first solo exhibition at the lecture hall of the National Library. The 5-day exhibition was officially opened by the Minister of State for Labour Mr Sia Kah Hui, and jointly sponsored by Singapore Art Society, Nanyang Academy of Fine Arts and the Society of Chinese Artists. Ng went on to become a renowned sculptor and in 1981, he was awarded the Cultural Medallion Award for his contributions to the Singapore arts scene.

In 1988, Ng received a visit by the director of the Paris Arts Centre representing the Olympic Selection Committee, at his studio one evening. He had requested a commission from Ng, to create a 3-metre sculpture piece for the Seoul Olympics and to have it completed within one month. Though Ng resisted the idea at first, the director convinced him to give precedence to his commission than to meet his own exhibition schedule. Eventually both parties agreed on replicating the model piece entitled Portrait from his studio. This piece not only could be easily replicated within the given time frame, it carried a humanistic message that was apt for the people in Korea during the tumultuous period prior to the Olympics.

On February 16, 2001 Ng was presented with the Montblanc de la Culture Arts Patronage Award at a dinner ceremony held at the Singapore Art Museum. He was given a commemorative Montblanc pen and a cheque for Euro 15,000 (S$23,800) to be given to an arts project of his choice. This award was handed to Ng for his generous donation of 933 of his paintings, drawings, sculptures, maquettes and ceramics to the National University of Singapore on two separate occasions - the first donation of 760 works made in 1997, followed by another 173 pieces in 1998. It was his wish to provide a good home for his entire collection, and to use them in an educational institution such as the University, to demonstrate how his creativity is explored and developed.

=== Death ===
In 1995 Ng was diagnosed with kidney problems. He kept this condition secret, only made known to others when he had undergone a heart bypass surgery in 1998. Ng Eng Teng battled pneumonia due to complications linked to kidney failure in the last 10 days of his life, and died in his sleep at about 11am on Sunday at his Studio 106, a kampung house at 106 Joo Chiat Place facing directly opposite to his residence at unit 127.

== Art ==
=== Public sculptures ===
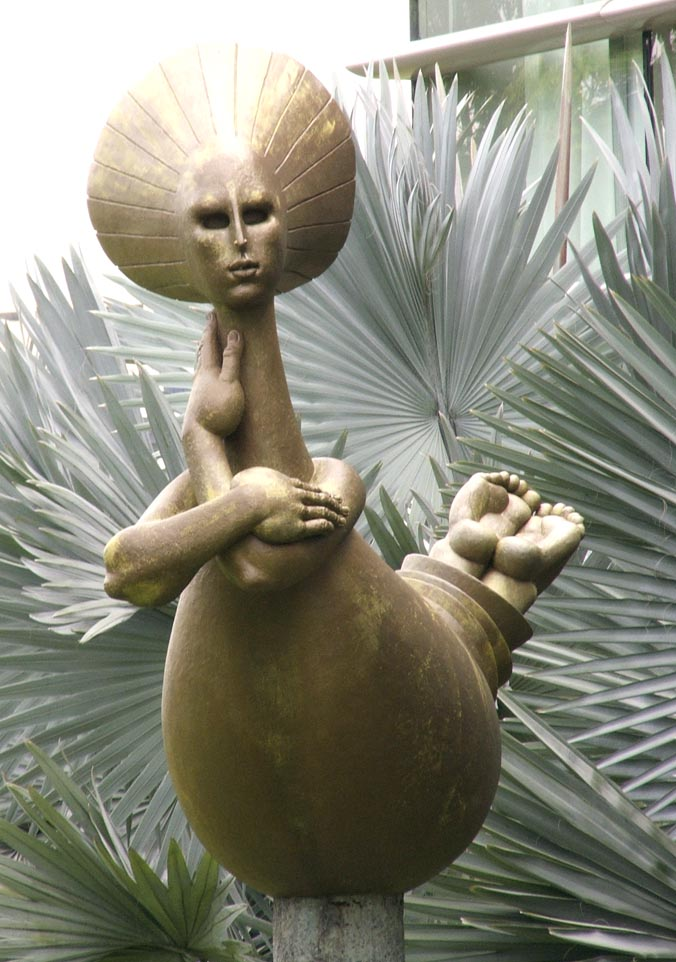
Wealth (1974)
Size: 206 cm x 259 cm x 92 cm
Medium: Ciment fondu
Collection: National University of Singapore (NUS) Museum.

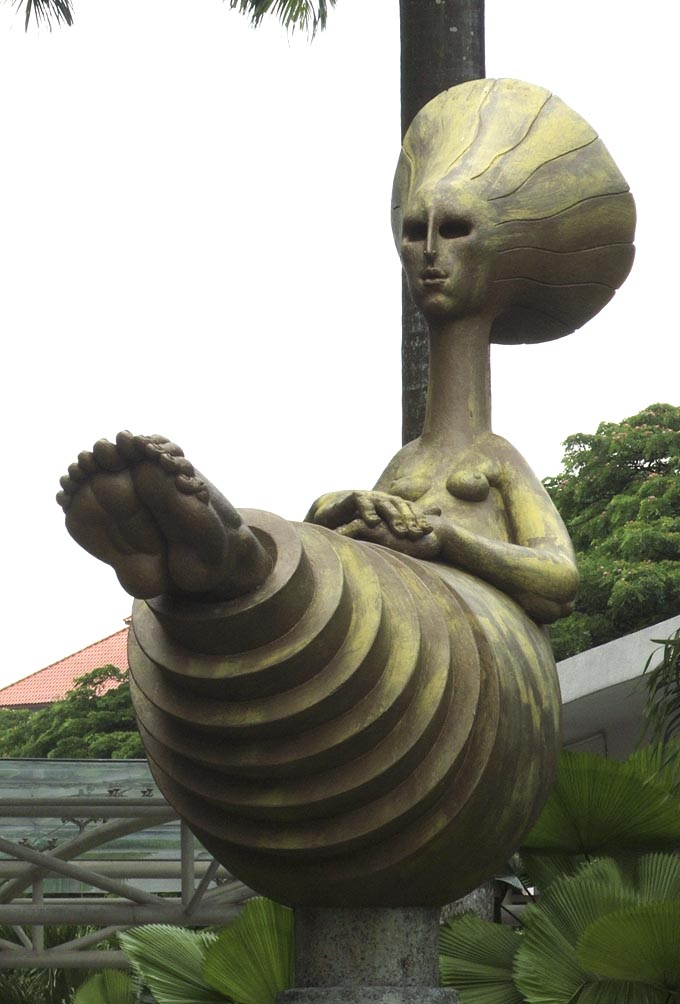
Contentment (1974)
Size: 206 cm x 229 cm x 92 cm
Medium: Ciment fondu
Collection: National University of Singapore (NUS) Museum.

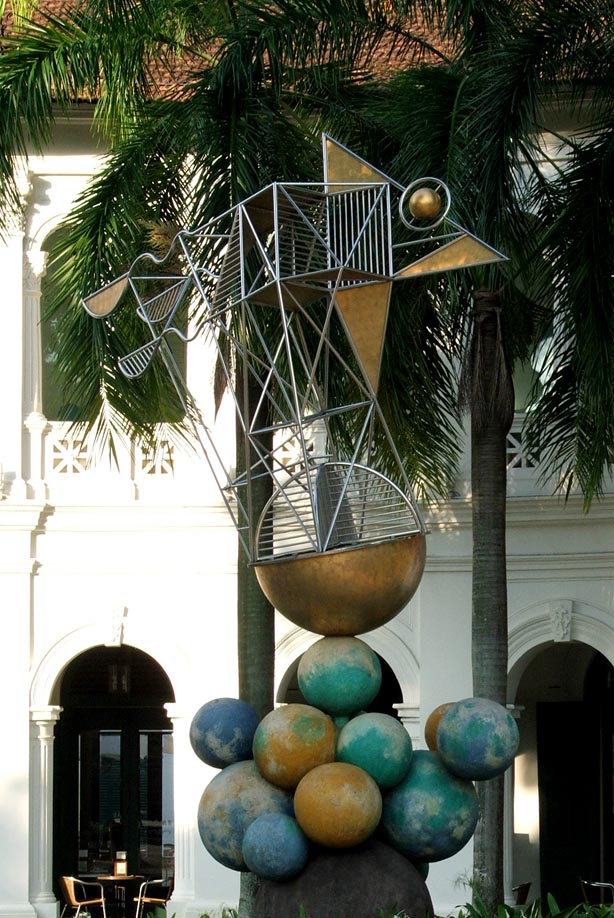
The Explorer (1999)
Size: 700 cm x 575 cm x 350 cm
Medium: Ciment fondu, stainless steel, gold leaf
Collection: Singapore Art Museum.
