= Nanyang Academy of Fine Arts =

Constituent art school of the University of the Arts Singapore

Coordinates: 1.300229°N 103.851573°E

Nanyang Academy of Fine Arts (NAFA)
- 南洋藝術學院 (Chinese); Akademi Seni Halus Nanyang (Malay) நன்யாங் அகாடமி ஆஃப் ஃபைன் ஆர்ட்ஸ் (Tamil)
- Motto: "To be a premier arts institution in Asia, producing leaders in their fields."
- Type: Publicly-funded; Arts institution
- Established: 1938
- Founders: Lim Hak Tai; Yong Mun Sen
- Parent institution: University of the Arts Singapore
- President: Tan-Soh Wai Lan
- Students: >2,400 (2015)
- Location: Bencoolen Street, Singapore
- Campus: Urban
- Nickname: NAFA
- Website: Official website

Nanyang Academy of Fine Arts (NAFA; Chinese: 南洋藝術學院; Malay: Akademi Seni Halus Nanyang; Tamil: நன்யாங் அகாடமி ஆஃப் ஃபைன் ஆர்ட்ஸ்) is a publicly-funded post-secondary arts institution in Singapore, and a constituent college of the University of the Arts Singapore (UAS) from 2024.

NAFA offers courses at high-school/Singapore's polytechnic equivalent diploma, Bachelor's Degree and Master's Degree levels. NAFA's diploma programmes provides comprehensive arts and design education appropriate for Singapore's polytechnic-level for students who have successfully completed their secondary school education, which is 10 years of studies in Singapore. As an industry-oriented alternative to a broader-based junior college education in Singapore, NAFA's diploma graduates in Singapore are sought after for work or many continue to complete university degrees. NAFA's Diploma Programme in Singapore admits the majority of their students after secondary school, normally at the age of 16–17, which is after ten years of formal education, similar to the other polytechnics in Singapore. Diplomas in a specialised area of study, for example 3D Design, are awarded after completing 3-years of full-time studies and industry internship.

Demand for its programmes has remained strong, and the school projects a student population of 3,300 by 2024. NAFA offers full-time diploma and degree programmes across three faculties: Faculty of Art and Design comprising the School of Fine Art, School of 3D Design, School of Design and Media, as well as the School of Fashion Studies; Faculty of Performing Arts comprising School of Dance, School of Music, and School of Theatre; Faculty of Interdisciplinary Practices comprising School of Arts Management and School of Interdisciplinary Arts.

The institution also offers a full range of government tuition fees subsidised, 2 to 3-years undergraduate degree programmes for NAFA's diploma graduates in partnership with the prestigious University of the Arts London in England, United Kingdom. Students with GCE A-Level certificates as well as those without a relevant Singapore's polytechnic diplomas will be allowed to enrol in NAFA-UAL's degree programmes for the first time. Diploma courses are aligned with the degree courses offered in partnership with top universities in the world, including Royal College of Music, London.

NAFA has nurtured 16 recipients of the Cultural Medallion—Singapore's highest accolade bestowed on art practitioners who have significantly impacted arts and culture. Another 15 alumni have been presented the Young Artist Award.

== History ==
NAFA was founded in a two-storey Geylang shophouse in 1938 by Lim Hak Tai, with its first class made up of 14 students.

In February 1981, the Foochow Association announced that it would be closing the San Shan School located at 107A Sophia Road. The buildings were to be occupied by the NAFA, which was to move in following the closing of the San Shan School. NAFA paid the association a nominal rent of $120 per year. However, the association announced in 1983 that the rent would be increased to $25,000 beginning in January of the following year. NAFA moved out of the site in that year.

In March 2021, Minister for Education Lawrence Wong announced that Singapore's first university of the arts will be established from an alliance between the NAFA and LASALLE College of the Arts, while the colleges retain distinct identities. The university formed under this alliance will be given degree-awarding powers independent of their current foreign partners, and Singaporeans and permanent residents enrolled in the approved degree programmes at the university will pay subsidised fees, comparable to the autonomous universities in Singapore. In 2024, the University of the Arts Singapore(UAS), was opened.

== Academics ==
Apart from the regular academic requirements, entry into the diploma programme also requires students to fulfil their artistic and design potential aspect through portfolio submission, admission test or audition. The intakes especially for the furniture design major from the 3D design course are deliberately kept small so that each student gets focused attention. Selection is competitive and is subject to the availability of places too.

Diploma students can advance into any Singaporean universities strictly depending on the diploma major the student graduated with, for example the National University of Singapore (NUS) or the Singapore Management University. In 2020 with the opening of the new bachelor of landscape architecture course through the National University of Singapore, prospective students that graduated from NAFA's diploma in design (landscape and architecture) programme will be eligible for up to 28 advanced placement credits without any placement tests, into the bachelor of landscape architecture course.

Many students also opted for overseas universities upon graduation with the diploma, mostly in a related areas as their diploma studies such as fine arts, architecture, interior design, landscape, graphic design, fashion, music, and theatre, among others. Other than Singapore's polytechnic-level diploma, Nanyang Academy of Fine Arts also collaborates with University of the Arts London to offer a government subsidised 2-years Bachelor's degree-level education for their diploma graduates, or 3-year bachelor's degrees for Singapore's GCE A level or other non-relevant Singapore's polytechnic diploma graduates.

Since 2006, Nanyang Academy of Fine Arts students are granted accelerated bachelor's degree programmes with Nanyang Technological University, meaning that diploma holders will have the option to pursue a direct honours degree over a shorter span of three years or less. Academy students can also apply for places in any faculty freely in the university with advanced placement through the signing ceremony for the memorandum of understanding.

NAFA's partnership with RCM for the bachelor of music programme was established in 2011 with an initial batch of 20 students. Since then, more than 200 students have graduated from the programme. The key design feature of the programme is the two-year degree top up to the existing NAFA Diploma in Music programme. In the final year of the programme, students in western music studies head to RCM for a 7-week placement in January, while those studying Chinese music attend their 10-week placement in September at the Central Conservatory of Music in Beijing. For students who are looking to pursue postgraduate studies, NAFA - RCM offers performance degree courses at the Master’s level in Singapore. The Master of Performance and Master of Composition route develops Western and Chinese instrumentalists' performance or composition skills to a high professional level through intensive training within 2 years (full time) or 3 years (part time).

Apart from regular diplomas, there is also a special 4-year diploma course where students will study for the first 3 years at the Nanyang Academy of Fine Arts and the final year at the National Institute of Education, from which students will graduate with a diploma in art education or a diploma in music education from NAFA and a diploma in art education or diploma in music education from the NIE. Graduates from this scheme will be deployed to teach art or music in primary schools.

== Schools and campus location ==
School of Design and media	Campus 1
School of Fine Art	Campus 1
School of 3D Design	Campus 1
School of Fashion Studies	Campus 2
School of Arts Management	Campus 3
School of Dance	Campus 3
School of Theatre	Campus 3
School of Music	Campus 3
School of Interdisciplinary Arts	All Campuses

== Campuses ==
NAFA operates from four campuses along Bencoolen Street. All four campuses are located within walking distances apart in the same vicinity.

=== Campus 1 ===
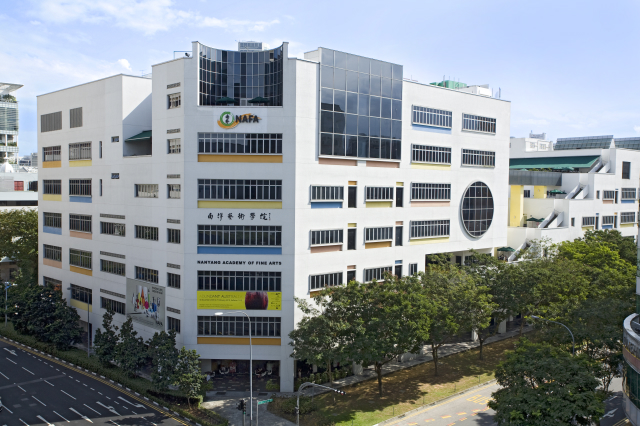
NAFA's Campus 1

NAFA Campus 1 is divided into two wings, Wing A & Wing B, with a linking bridge. It boasts a high-definition studio, a creative media studio for 3D animation and special effects, and audio-video production facilities.

Skylight studios allow painting in natural, evenly-distributed daylight. There are also photography studios equipped with studio flash systems and digital cameras and jewelry workshops with casting, processing and setting facilities, interior design material and project room, drafting studios and 3D model eorkshops and three art galleries with a total exhibition area of 850 sq m.

A two-storey library is located in Wing A. It houses a collection of arts-related publications and journals available for members, staff and students. The Tanoto Foundation Centre for Southeast Asian Arts is located on the seventh floor. TFCSEA@NAFA, a website housing a full-text bilingual database of more than 100,000 pages of Southeast Asian arts materials was launched in 2011 to aid scholars and students' research in this area. Arts institutions and the general republic can join as members to access the materials online.

=== Campus 1 Tower Block ===
The NAFA Campus 1 Tower Block is located on top of the Bencoolen MRT station, adjacent to NAFA Campus 1. Built in 2017 at a cost of $40 million, the building has art studios and classrooms meant to increase the available work and study space for students. It was the first expansion for the institution since its move to Bencoolen St. in 2004. Minister for Education Ong Ye Kung officially opened the Nanyang Academy of Fine Arts' Campus 1 Tower Block during the school's 80th anniversary celebrations.

=== Campuses 2 and 3 ===
Campus 2 houses workshops for batik printing, textile development and embroidery design, drafting and draping, among other facilities, and houses the Fashion Studies Department. Campus 3 contains a 380-seat theatre with a rotating central platform on its stage, an adjustable orchestra pit, and two Steinway model D grand pianos. Other facilities include a recital hall, soundproof music studios and dance studios.

== Notable alumni ==
- Constance Lau - Singaporean actress
- Ceno2 - Graffiti artist
- Julie Tan - Singaporean actress
- Mohammad Din Mohammad, painter
- Anthony Poon, Singaporean Artist
- Isyana Sarasvati, Indonesian singer and songwriter
- M. Nasir, Singaporean singer and songwriter
- Chloe Chua, Singaporean violinist

=== Cultural Medallion recipients ===
Year of award	Name	Discipline	Year of Graduation
1979	Wee Beng Chong	Art	1958
1981	Ng Eng Teng	Art	1961
1981	Lee Hock Moh	Art	1970
1984	Thomas Yeo	Art	1960
1985	Tay Chee Toh	Art	1960
1990	Anthony Poon	Art	1964
1995	Han Sai Por	Art	1977
2001	Tan Kian Por	Art	1970
2005	Chng Seok Tin	Visual arts	1972
2006	Tan Choh Tee	Visual arts	1962
2009	Ang Ah Tee	Visual arts	1962
2011	Lim Yew Kuan	Visual arts	1950
2015	Chua Mia Tee	Visual arts	1952

=== Young Artist Award recipients ===
Year of award	Name	Discipline	Ref
1992	S. Chandrasekaran	Visual arts	
1995	Baet Yeok Kuan	Visual arts	
1997	Lim Poh Teck	Visual arts	
2000	Lim Chin Huat	Dance	
2000	Hong Sek Chern	Visual arts	
2001	Goh Boon Teck	Theatre	
2001	Chua Say Hua Anthony	Visual arts	
2002	Tay Bak Chiang	Visual arts	
2006	Goh Toh Chai Zechariah	Music	
2006	Yeo Chee Kiong	Visual arts	
2013	Mohammed Zulkarnaen Bin Othman (Zero)	Visual arts	
2013	Muhammad Zaki B Abd Razak	Visual arts	
2013	Chua Yew Kok	Music	
2016	Muhamad Harezam Bin Abdul Rahman (Ezzam Rahman)	Fine art	
2022	Rit Xu	Music	

== Image gallery ==
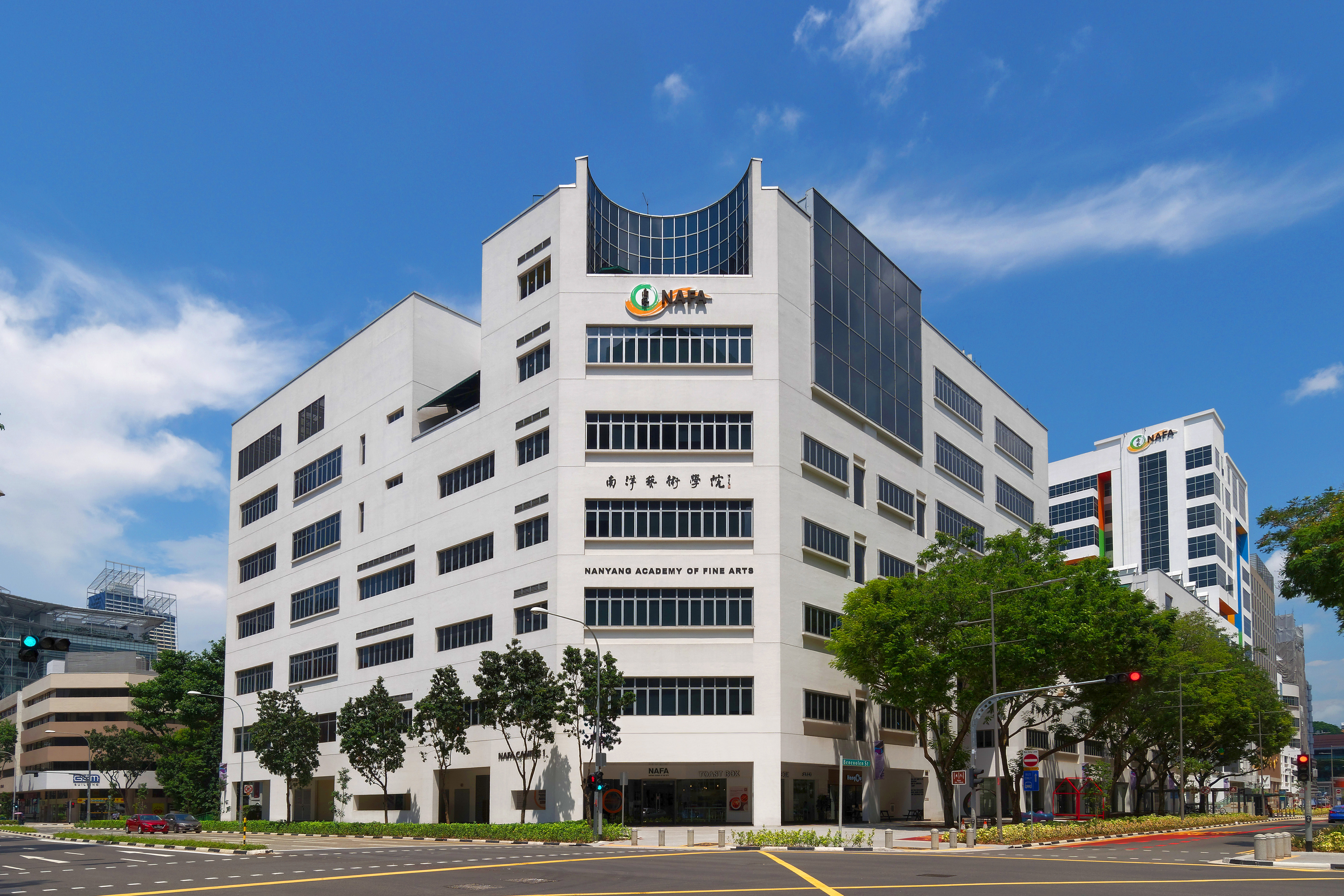

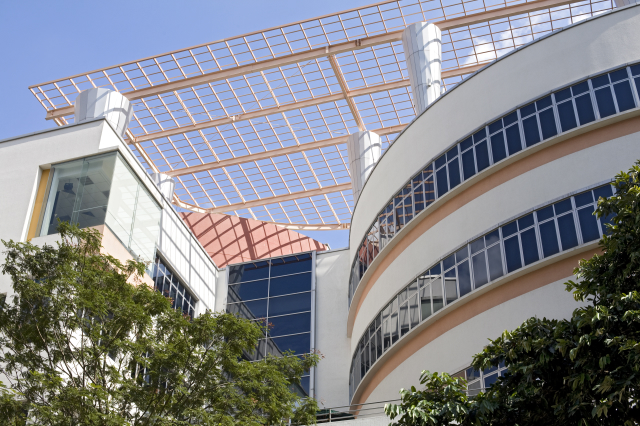

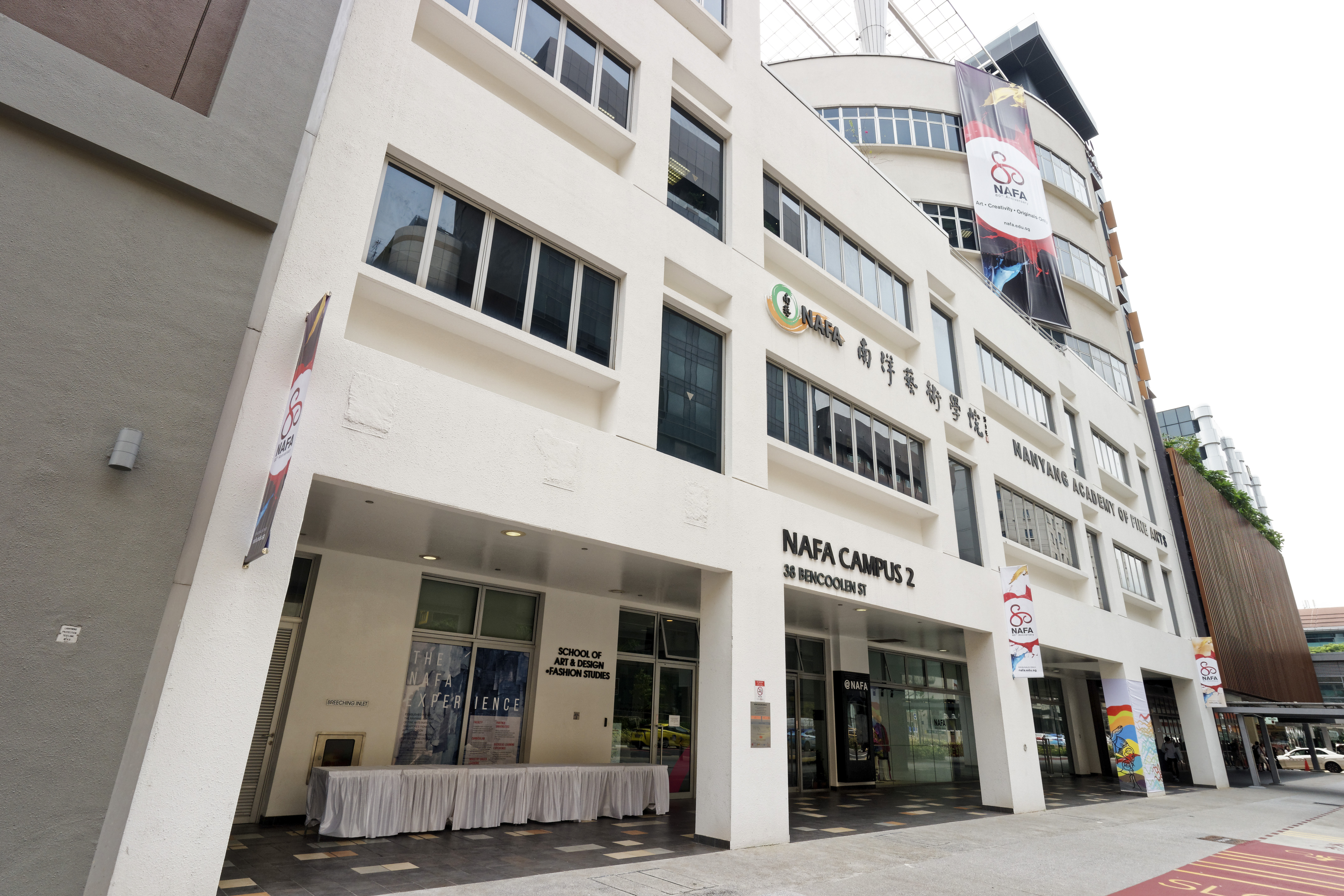

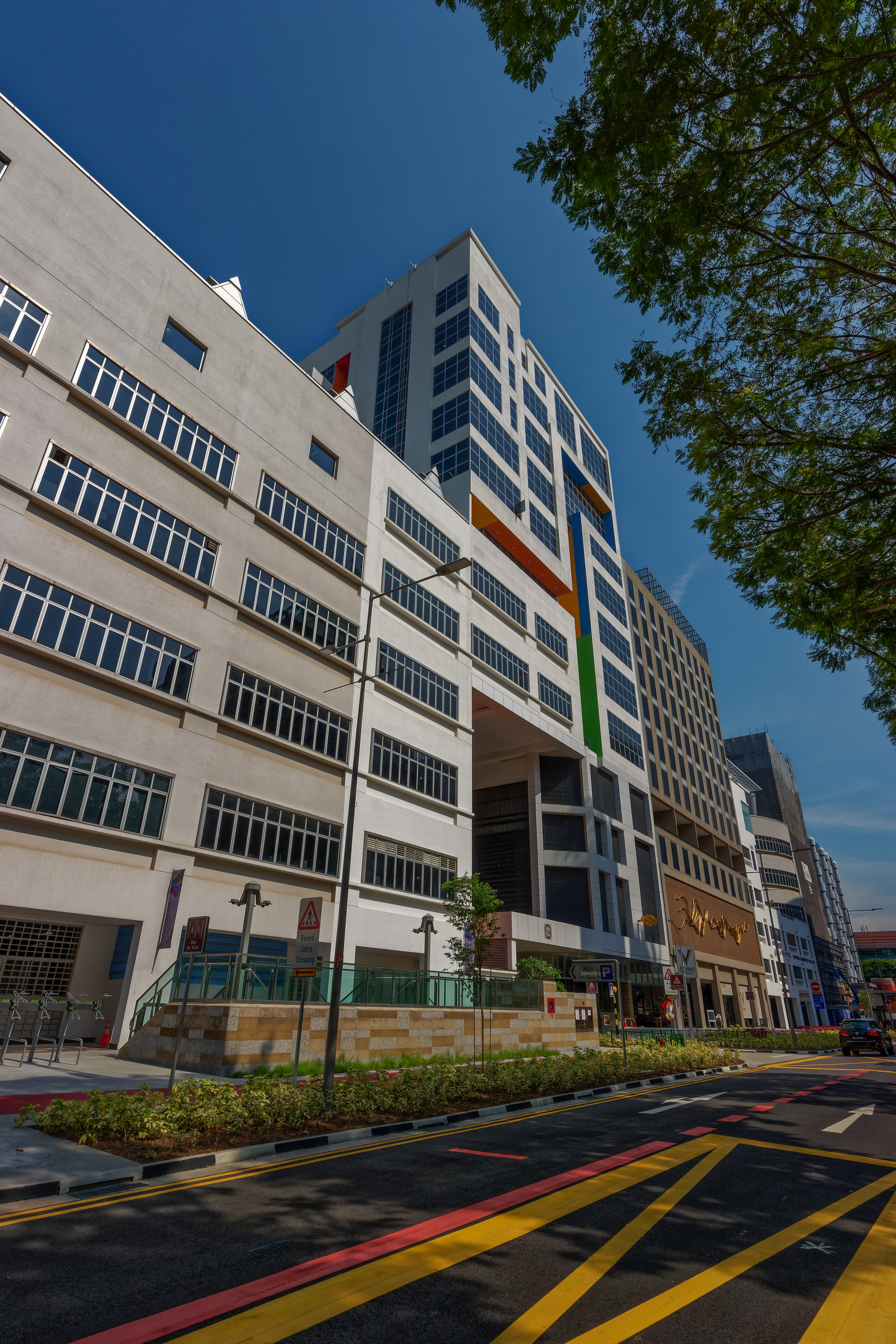

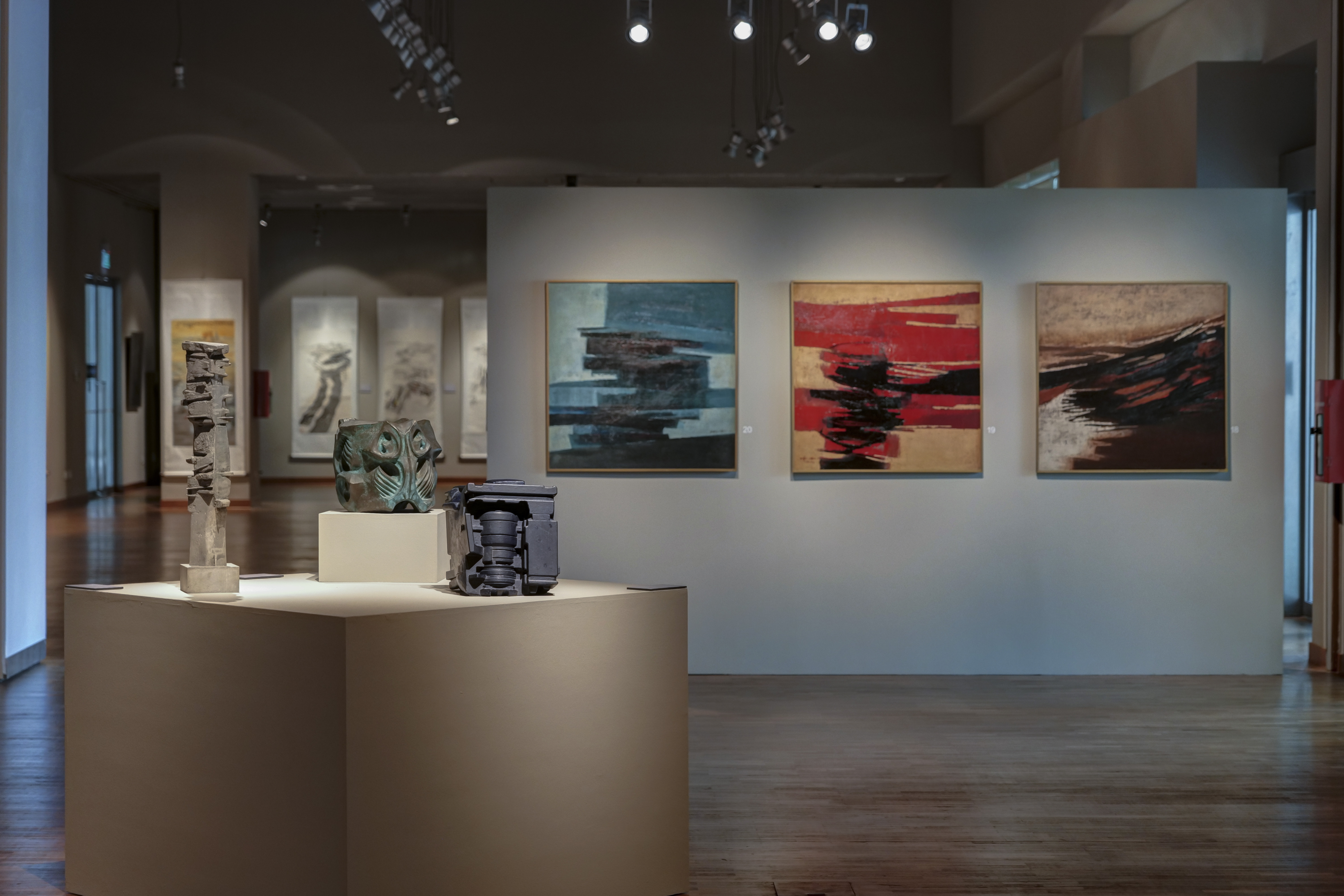

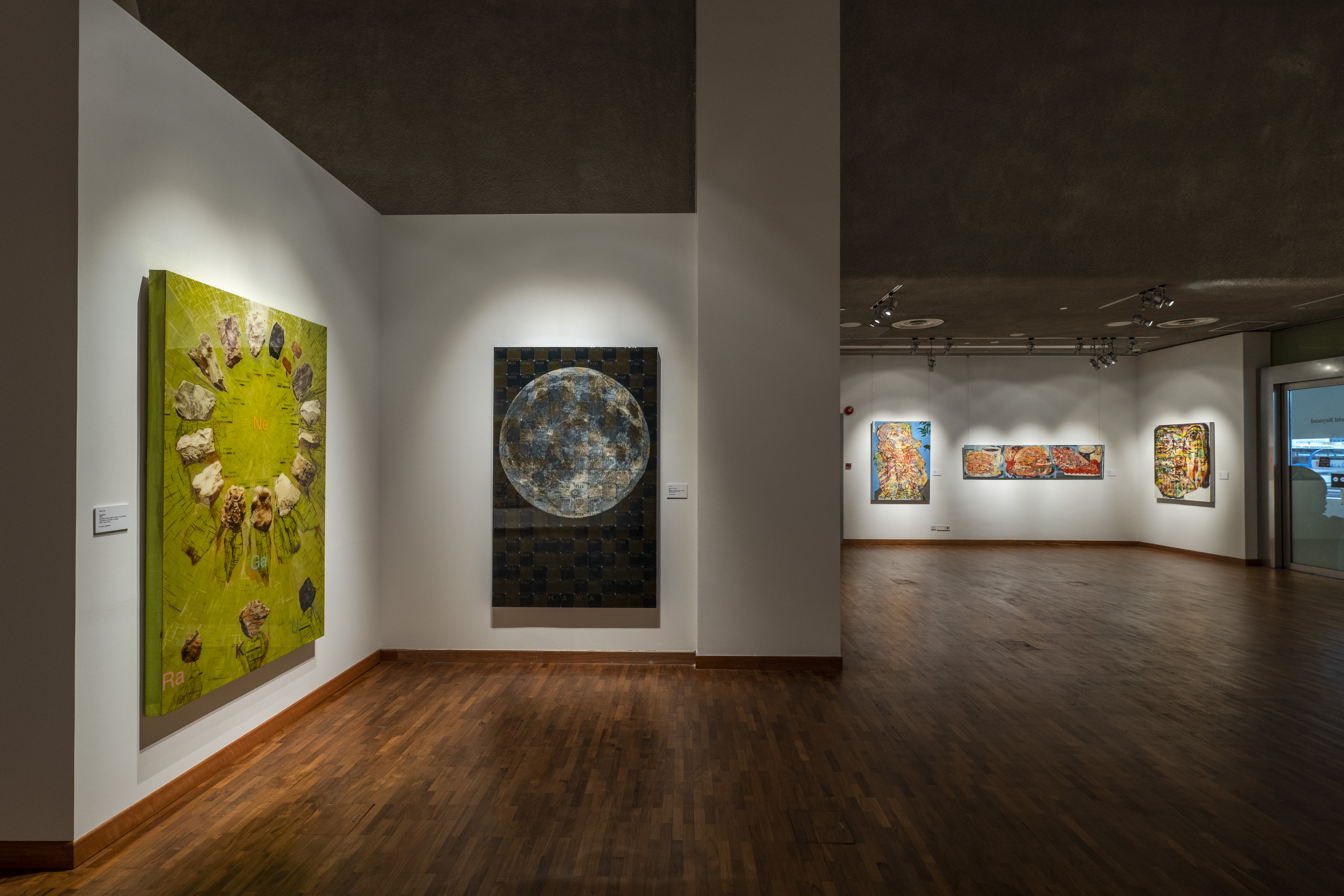

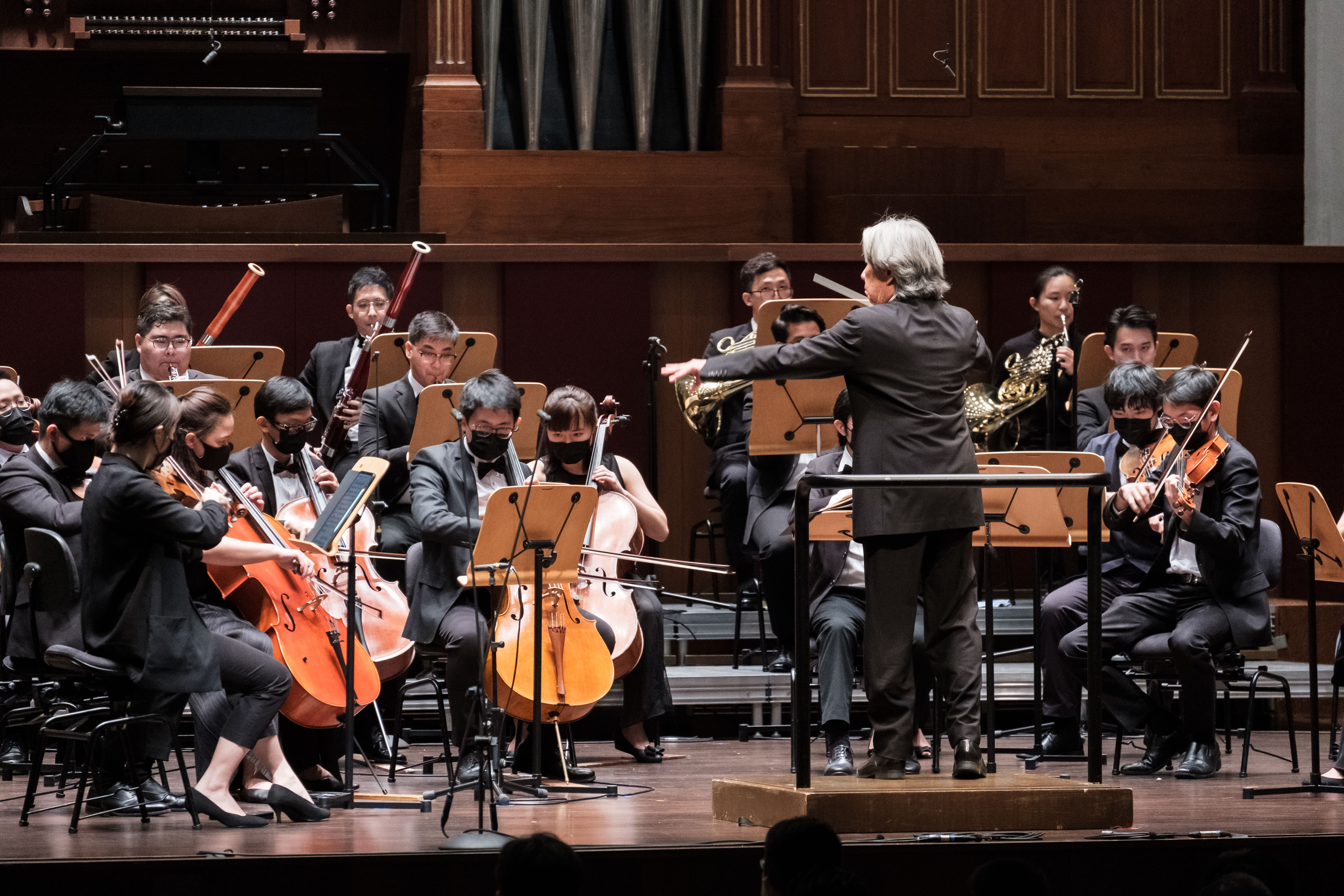

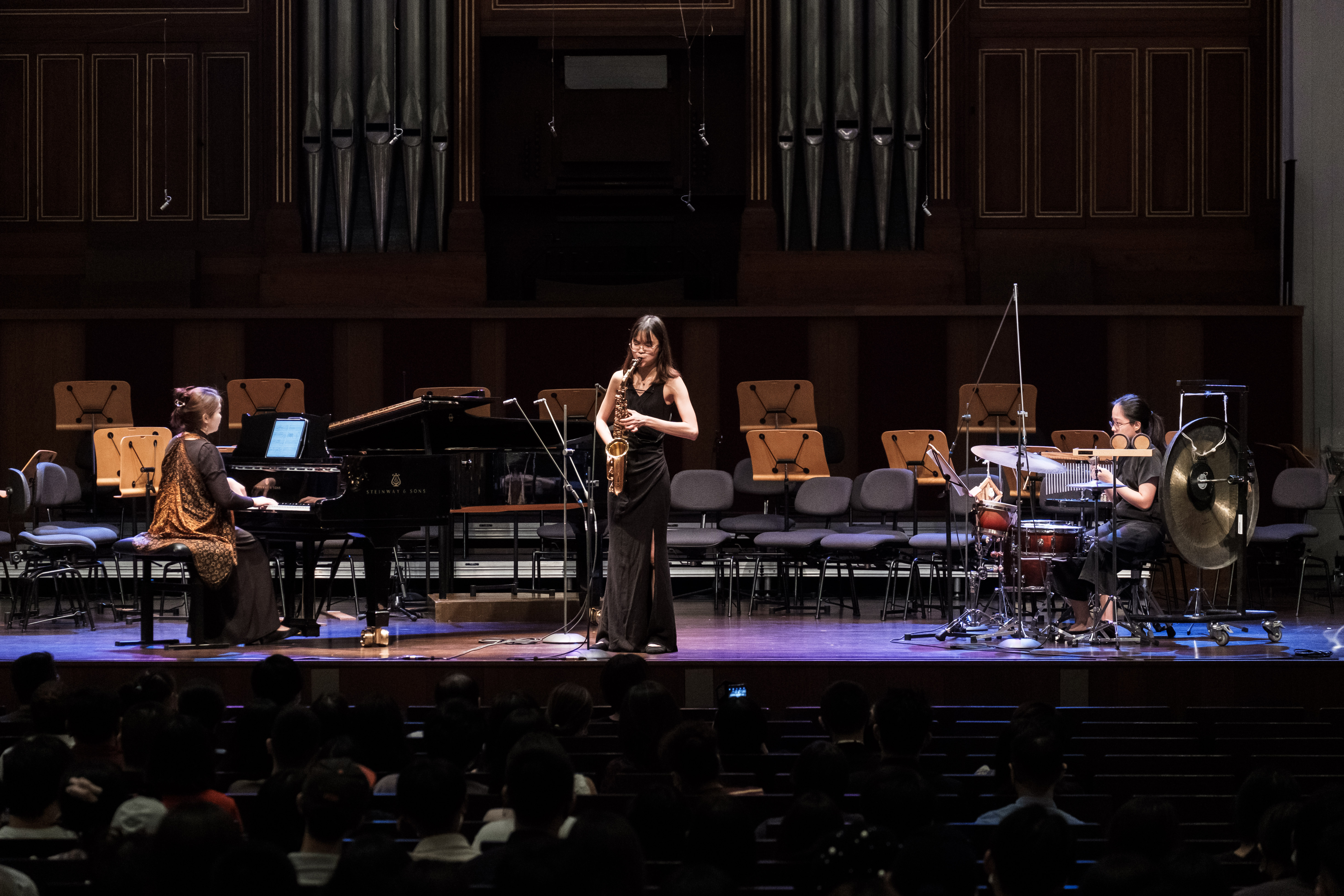
