= List of Singaporean artists =

This is a list of visual artists from Singapore. These include fine artists working in traditional media such as painting, sculpture, and printmaking, as well as other media associated with modern and contemporary art, such as installation art, performance art, conceptual art, photography, video art, sound art, and new media art, for instance.

This list is intended to encompass Singaporeans who are working primarily in the fine arts. For information on those who work primarily in film, television, music, comics, advertising, graphic design, video games, dance, or theatre, please see the relevant respective articles.

== A ==
- Abdul Ghani Hamid (1933–2014), writer, poet, and painter
- Ang Ah Tee (born 1943), painter
- Aw Tee Hong (born 1931), painter and sculptor

== C ==
- S. Chandrasekaran (born 1959), performance artist
- Yanyun Chen (born 1986), charcoal artist
- Chen Cheng Mei (1927–2020), painter and printmaker
- Chen Chong Swee (1910–1985), painter
- Georgette Chen (1906–1993), painter
- Chen Wen Hsi (1906–1991), painter
- Cheong Soo Pieng (1917–1983), painter
- Chng Nai Wee (born 1969), installation artist and eye surgeon
- Chng Seok Tin (1946–2019), printmaker, sculptor, and mixed media artist
- Chong Fah Cheong (born 1946), sculptor
- Sarah Choo Jing (born 1990), photographer, video and installation artist
- Choy Weng Yang (born 1930), painter, curator, and arts writer
- Chua Ek Kay (1947–2008), painter
- Genevieve Chua (born 1984), painter and installation artist
- Chua Mia Tee (born 1931), painter
- Chua Soo Bin (born 1932), fine art photographer
- John Clang (born 1973), fine art photographer

== D ==
- Debbie Ding (born 1984), installation artist and technologist
- Tania De Rozario (born 1982), writer and installation artist

== G ==
- Goh Beng Kwan (born 1937), mixed media artist

== H ==
- Han Sai Por (born 1943), sculptor
- Amanda Heng (born 1951), performance artist
- Ho Ho Ying (1936–2022), painter
- Ho Tzu Nyen (born 1976), installation artist and filmmaker

== I ==
- Iskandar Jalil (born 1940), ceramicist

== J ==
- Juliana Yasin (1970–2014), painter, installation, and performance artist

== K ==
- Joyce Beetuan Koh (born 1968), composer and sound artist

== L ==
- Lai Kui Fang (born 1936), painter
- Lee Boon Wang (1934–2016), painter
- Lee Wen (1957–2019), performance artist
- Charles Lim (born 1973), video and installation artist
- Lim Cheng Hoe (1912–1979), painter
- Lim Hak Tai (1893–1963), painter
- Kim Lim (1936–1997), sculptor
- Lim Tzay Chuen (born 1972), conceptual artist
- Lim Tze Peng (born 1923), painter
- Lin Hsin Hsin, IT inventor, new media artist, poet and composer
- Susie Lingham (born 1965), writer and curator, performance, installation, and sound artist
- Liu Kang (artist) (1911–2004), painter
- Sam Lo, street artist
- Jahan Loh (born 1976), street artist
- Loo Zihan (born 1983), filmmaker and performance artist
- Steve Lu (born 1919), painter

== M ==
- Mohammad Din Mohammad (1955–2007), painter and sculptor

== N ==
- Kumari Nahappan (born 1953), sculptor
- Solamalay Namasivayam (1926–2013), life drawing artist
- Dawn Ng (born 1982), installation artist
- Josef Ng (born 1972), performance artist
- Ng Eng Teng (1934–2001), sculptor

== O ==
- Donna Ong (born 1978), installation artist and sculptor
- Ong Kim Seng (born 1945), painter

== P ==
- Ruben Pang (born 1990), painter
- Charmaine Poh (born 1990), photographer and multimedia artist
- Poh Siew Wah (born 1948), painter
- Anthony Poon (1945–2006), painter

== R ==
- Shubigi Rao (born 1975), installation artist and writer

== S ==
- Salleh Japar (born 1962), installation artist
- Sarkasi Said (1940–2021), batik artist
- See Hiang To (1906–1990) Chinese calligrapher, painter, and seal-carver
- Sim Chi Yin (born 1978), photographer and artist
- Sun Yee (1919–2010), painter

== T ==
- Alvin Mark Tan (born 1976), natural realism artist and muralist
- Namiko Chan Takahashi (born 1974), painter
- Tan Choh Tee (born 1976), painter
- Erika Tan (born 1967), video and installation artist
- Tan Swie Hian (born 1943), painter
- Tang Da Wu (born 1943), installation and performance artist
- Tay Bee Aye (born 1958), installation artist
- Eng Tow (born 1947), textile and mixed media artist

== V ==
- Suzann Victor (born 1959), installation and performance artist

== W ==
- Ming Wong (born 1971), video, installation, and performance artist
- Wong Keen (born 1942), painter

== Y ==
- Arthur Yap (1943–2006), poet, writer, and painter
- Thomas Yeo (born 1936), painter
- Yip Cheong Fun (1903–1989), documentary photographer

== Z ==
- Zhang Fuming (born 1989), printmaker
- Robert Zhao Renhui (born 1983), photographer
