= Chen Cheng Mei =

Singaporean artist (1927–2020)

- 陳城梅
- Born: 1927; Singapore
- Died: 2020 (aged 93); Singapore
- Education: Nanyang Academy of Fine Arts, Singapore (1954)
- Known for: Oil painting, sketches, photographs, etchings, lithography

Chinese name
- Traditional Chinese: 陳城梅
- Simplified Chinese: 陈城梅
Transcriptions
Standard Mandarin
- Hanyu Pinyin: Chén Chéng Méi

Chen Cheng Mei (simplified Chinese: 陈城梅; traditional Chinese: 陳城梅; pinyin: Chén Chéng Méi; 1927–2020), also known as Tan Seah Boey, was a Singaporean artist known for her pioneering work as the woman behind the Ten Men Art Group. A loose collective of Singapore-based artists, the Ten Men Art Group made work based on their travels around Southeast Asia in the 1960s, and around China and India in the 1970s.

She initiated a trip with three artists to Peninsular Malaysia in 1960, which led to another journey the following year with ten participants, this time headed by artist Yeh Chi Wei after Chen proposed that he lead the trip in her stead. Further excursions to Cambodia, Indonesia, Thailand, Borneo, and other locations followed, which involved the group visiting key artists, as well as creating sketches and taking photographs of temples, villages, cities, and the countrysides from these areas.

Chen's later practice of solo journeys would see her work engaging with Africa and South Asia in the decades following their decolonisation, depicting scenes from locations such as Nairobi, New Delhi, and the Sahara.

Until recently, Chen's early role in the Ten Men Art Group had been eclipsed by that of her male counterparts. Chen, who was rather private about her practice, did not hold her first solo exhibition in Singapore until much later in 2004, when she was in her 70s.

Chen died at the age, 93 in 2020.

== Education and personal life ==
Chen was born in Singapore in 1937. Chen’s father was a successful businessperson and orchard owner, and her mother the niece of Teo Eng Hock, the founder of the Singapore branch of the Kuomintang and a close associate of Sun Yat-sen. Chen graduated from the Nanyang Academy of Fine Arts, Singapore in 1954, majoring in Western painting. Her teachers there would include Lim Hak Tai and Cheong Soo Pieng. Before studying at NAFA, Chen had joined the YMCA Art Club, led by artists Lim Cheng Hoe and T.Y. Choy.

Chen worked as a French translator for a bank in Singapore until 1971, when she decided to be a full-time artist. Chen travelled widely, taking over 200 trips to regions such as Asia, Africa, the Americas, Europe, and the Pacific.

== Career ==
In 1960, Chen initiated a trip to Peninsular Malaysia with three fellow artists, including her brother Tan Teo Kwang. The collective would grow with its next trip, later taking the name of Ten Men Art Group. For future trips, Chen declined to lead and proposed that artist Yeh Chi Wei take the role instead. In 1961, the ten artists comprising the group, including Chen, embarked on their first trip together, heading to Kota Bharu and around Peninsular Malaysia with Chen’s husband making arrangements for cars and drivers. Following their return to Singapore, the group held an exhibition at the Victoria Memorial Hall that garnered a great amount of interest. The Ten Men Art Group would make several more trips in the next few years, with Chen and Yeh Chi Wei discussing the destinations between each other. The group travelled to Java and Bali in 1962, Cambodia and Thailand in 1963, Sarawak in 1965, Borneo in 1968, and during the 1970s, China and India.

In 1969, Chen studied etching and lithography with artist Stanley William Hayter at Atelier 17 in Paris. Though her time there was brief, these printmaking techniques would become central to Chen’s practice from then onwards, and she would participate in group exhibitions of printmaking in Singapore from 1992 to 2004. In 1971, Chen resigned from her translator job at the Bank of China after working there for 20 years, deciding to become a full-time artist. She embarked on solo trips and develops her individual practice, first going to India and Nepal for the first time for a self-organised study and sketching trip. She would return to India at least eight times, travelling widely to other locations in South Asia. In 1984, she travelled alone to Papua New Guinea, which would become one of her favourite locations. Chen would donate an imported printing press to the LASALLE College of the Arts in 1986. Through the 80s, Chen would participate in group exhibitions in Japan, Monaco, and Australia.

In 1990, Chen travelled to Africa for the first time, visiting Mauritius and Kenya. In 1993 she returned to Africa to visit countries such as South Africa, Eswatini, Zimbabwe, and Zambia. In 2004, Chen held her first solo exhibition in Singapore, featuring her prints. In 2008, she held another solo exhibition at the National Library, Singapore, featuring her oil paintings. A retrospective solo exhibition of Chen's work was held in 2014 at NAFA's Lim Hak Tai gallery in Singapore, featuring her prints, oil paintings, and works on paper. In 2015, Chen's work was also featured at the inaugural long-term exhibition by the National Gallery Singapore, Siapa Nama Kamu: Art in Singapore since the 19th Century.

In 2020, Chen died in Singapore at the age of 93. Her practice was posthumously featured as part of the 2021 exhibition, The Tailors and the Mannequins: Chen Cheng Mei and You Khin, at the National Gallery Singapore.

== Art ==
Chen's practice was characterised by short study trips across many different locations, creating numerous sketches and taking back photographs, souvenirs, and memories that she developed further as work in her studio. Chen, in depicting the Global South in her work, has been described by curator Roger Nelson as being "encounterist" in her approach, with her work seeking "to dramatise and restage the artist’s subjective experience at the ephemeral moment of encounter, rather than characterising or judging the essential nature of the people, place or culture being encountered." In this sense, in contrast to Western primitivism which saw its subjects as "un-civilised", Chen's work recognised the inherent modernity of other cultures and did not seek to portray these cultures as more "exotic" or "pure" than her own.
