= Tchang Ju Chi =

Chinese cartoonist

Tchang Ju Chi (Chinese: 张汝器; 1904 — 1942), also known under the pseudonym Lian Ruo, was a Chinese cartoonist who was one of the earliest practising artists in Singapore.

== Early life and education ==
Tchang was born in Chao'an, Guangdong in 1904. After graduating from high school, he studied at the Shanghai University Fine Arts College. he later attended the Marseille Academy of Fine Arts.

== Career ==
While he was passing through Singapore, he was persuaded by friends to stay. He was then employed at the Tuan Mong School and the Yeung Ching School as a teacher. On 11 February 1929, he established the Ju Chi studio, which dealt in advertisements and apprenticeship classes, at 306 River Valley Road. On 15 July, he became the editor-in-chief of the Sin Chew Jit Poh literary supplement Starlight. In August, he chaired the Singapore Fine Art Exhibition, which was organised by the Singapore Youth Lee Chee Association. In the following year, he became the editor-in-chief of Coconut Splendour, a pictorial supplement to Lat Pau.

In 1936, Tchang became the first president of the Society of Chinese Artists. Following the Nanyang Academy of Fine Arts, he began teaching at the academy. His artworks were the first to feature the "Nanyang colour". Prior to the Japanese occupation of Singapore, he produced several works which criticised the Japanese, including one which depicted Chinese women being raped by the Imperial Japanese Army, which impelled overseas Chinese to raise funds for the war effort in China. According to artist Liu Kang, Tchang's "realistic oil paintings are characterised by charming colours, an elegant and gentle style, and the meticulous depiction of subject."

== Death ==
He was arrested by the Japanese military in February 1942 during Sook Ching. He was then executed on Changi Beach with his sister's husband, artist Zhang Youzhao.

Some of his works are placed on display at the permanent exhibition Siapa Nama Kamu? at the National Gallery Singapore.
