= Certificate of Honor =

Certificate of honor is an award issued by various establishments. It may refer to:

- Russian Federation Presidential Certificate of Honour, Russian award
- Sijil Kemuliaan, Singaporean award
- Government of Ukraine Certificate of Honour
