= Thomas Yeo =

Singaporean artist

- Born: 1936 (age 89–90)
- Education: Nanyang Academy of Fine Arts
- Occupation: Artist
- Family: Yeo Cheow Tong (brother)

Thomas Yeo (born 22 April 1936) is a Singaporean artist. His first solo exhibition came in 1960 at the Singapore Chinese Chamber of Commerce and Industry. In 1984 he was awarded the Cultural Medallion.

== Personal life ==
Yeo is born to an optician father and housewife mother, and has 12 siblings. One of his brothers is former Cabinet minister Yeo Cheow Tong who served in the Cabinet from 1990 to 2006.

== Career ==
He enrolled in Nanyang Academy of Fine Arts from 1958 to 1960, where he studied with the artists Georgette Chen and Cheong Soo Pieng. From 1960 to 1964, he trained at the Chelsea School of Art and the Hammersmith College of Art & Architecture in London. His earliest solo show outside Singapore was at the Cathay Gallery in 1963. He returned to Singapore in 1967, and held solo exhibitions there and in Australia in 1973–77.

In 1983, he came second in Singapore's UOB Painting of the Year competition. In 1984, he received the Cultural Medallion from the National Arts Council, Singapore.

== Selected publications ==
- Singapore: Places, Poems, Paintings. Raffles editions. 1998. ISBN 978-9971-0-0861-1.
- South East Asian Art: A New Spirit. Art and Artist Speak. 1997-01-01. ISBN 978-981-00-9699-1.
