= Ho Ho Ying =

Singaporean artist (1935–2022)

Ho Ho Ying 何和应
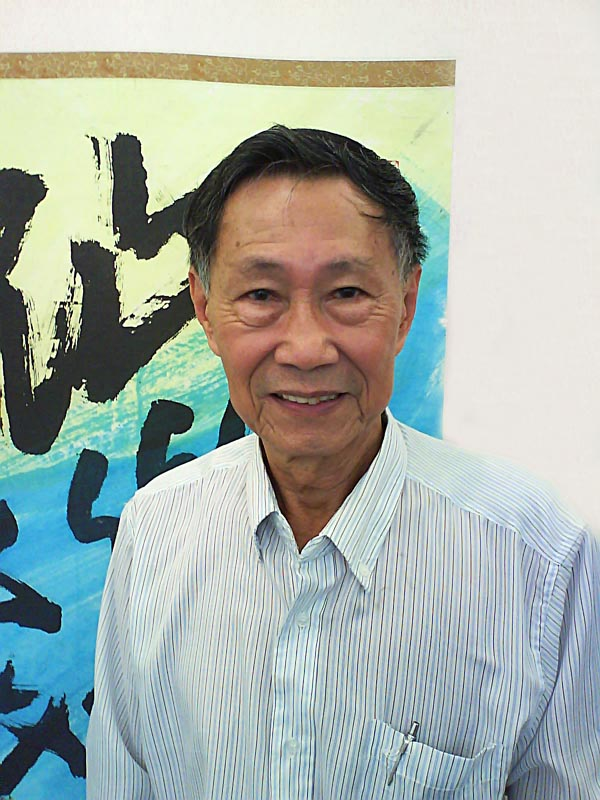
- Born: February 20, 1935; Maoting Village (茂亭村), Wenchang City, Hainan, China
- Died: October 31, 2022 (aged 87); Singapore
- Education: Liu Kang; Chen Wen Hsi
- Movement: Abstract expressionism, Chinese ink painting
- Awards: Cultural Medallion, 2012

Ho Ho Ying (Chinese: 何和应; pinyin: Hé Héyīng), also known by his writer's moniker, Zi Mu (Chinese: 子木; pinyin: Zǐ Mù), was a prominent Singaporean modern artist whose practice involved avant-garde Chinese calligraphy and abstract expressionist paintings. He co-founded the Modern Art Society in Singapore during the 1960s, and was an art critic that wrote essays calling for Singapore's art to grow in a new direction, arguing the case for abstraction over realism.

For his contributions to Singapore's visual arts, Ho was a recipient of the Cultural Medallion for Visual Arts in 2012.

Ho died on 31 October 2022 after a bout with COVID-19 left him in poor health.

== Early life and education ==
Ho was born on 20 February 1935 in Hainan, China, the eldest of five children. When he was born, his father had left the family for Kuala Lumpur to work as a cook for a British family. Much of his childhood years was spent with his mother, a housewife on the island, and at the outbreak of Second Sino-Japanese War Ho and his mother had escaped the invaders' capture and reunited with the elder Ho in Kuala Lumpur in 1941. He was 5 when he arrived in the city, only for the city to fall to the Japanese a year later.

Despite the war, Ho continued his education with the Chung Hwa Confucian Primary School (尊孔小学). There, he learnt basic Chinese calligraphy and took art classes, copying drawings made by his teacher on the blackboard. In his free time, he would immerse himself at comic book stalls along Petaling Street (Chinese: 茨厂街; pinyin: cíchǎng jiē), poring through Chinese wuxia comics (Chinese: 连环书; pinyin: liánhuán shū) and copying the comic book characters back home. He continued school at Chung Hwa Confucian High School (尊孔中学) until 1951, when his family relocated to Singapore.

He attended the Chinese High School, developing a strong interest in art under the influence of school teachers Liu Kang and Chen Wen Hsi. As he was poor and could not afford art materials, Chen would often offer him money to buy the art materials. Ho's confidence in his art grew as he was proficient with Chinese calligraphy and often won awards in school.

When he was 18 years old, his mother died of cervical cancer shortly after giving birth to his youngest sister. Without their mother, Ho had to take on the responsibility of taking care of his siblings and a 4-and-half months old infant sister, while his father was away working in a British household. As his father earned little as a cook, Ho often had to seek credit for food and provisions from shop owners.

In 1962 Ho graduated from Nanyang University with a Bachelor (Arts) in Chinese Language and Literature.

== Career ==
In 1963, Ho along with seven other artists Wee Beng Chong, Tong Siang Eng, Tay Chee Toh, Tan Yee Hong, Johnda Goh, and Ng Yat Chuang, frequently gathered together to discuss the development of the country's fine art, and came to develop a singular thought that modern art for Singapore should be explored with loft and zeal. In October that year, they founded the Modern Art Society and launched their First Modern Art Exhibition at the National Library.

In 1975, Ho was presented with an award the Malay arts group APAD (Angkatan Pelukis Aneka Daya) for his contribution in promoting art among different racial art groups in Singapore and uniting various ethnic art organisations.

For his contributions to Singapore's visual arts, Ho was a recipient of the Cultural Medallion for Visual Arts in 2012.

== Art ==
Ho's art evolved through his years, from Chinese calligraphy aesthetics ingrained in him when he was a schoolboy, to Western art influences by Impressionism and by mother-and-child paintings by Fauvist masters. In the 1950 - 60s, Ho found his true calling in his artistic expressions, when he laid eyes on Nature-themed semi-abstract paintings and Surrealism for the first time. He was especially enthralled by the free movements of American artists like Jackson Pollock and other artists existing at the time of his youth. This new spirited aesthetic resonated with the Taoist saying, Let thinking be like a bird in the sky - a saying that lived close to his art throughout his life. It inspired him to live freely in his canvas, escaping from the world of rigidity and systemic restrictions that humans live in. It enabled him to break boundaries in his expression on, and beyond the canvas. Together with his penchant for blue, red and black colours on his palette, his paintings show a unique artistic identity that is signature to Ho Ho Ying.

== Personal life ==
Ho caught COVID-19 early during the pandemic, undergoing mandatory quarantine at a facility at the Singapore Expo. While he survived, his bout with the virus left him in poor health, and Ho died on 31 October 2022.
