= Liu Thai Ker =

Singaporean architect and urban planner (1938–2026)

Liu Thai Ker DUBC PJG PPA(E)
- 刘太格
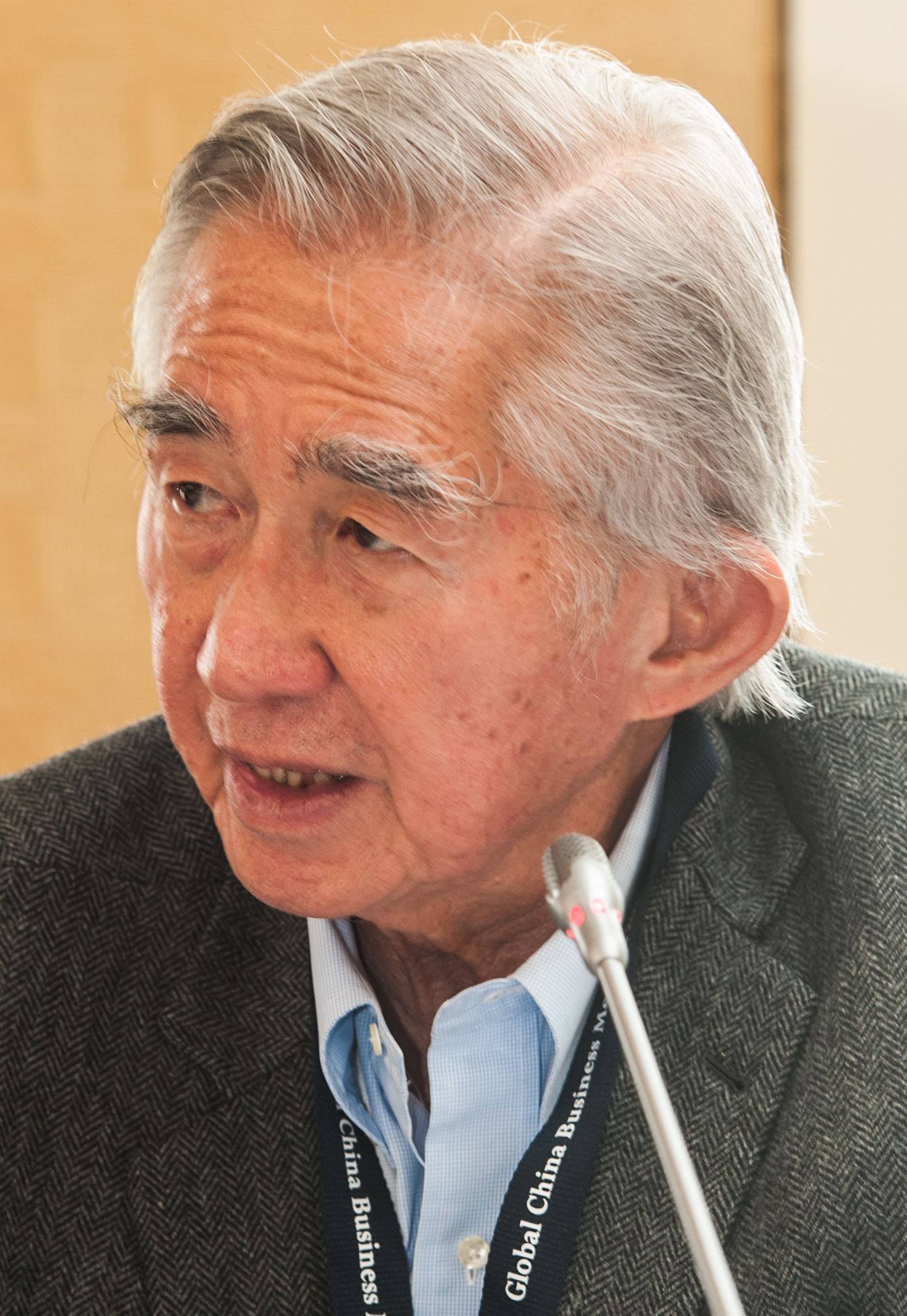
- Liu in 2013
- Born: 23 February 1938; Muar, Johor, Unfederated Malay States, British Malaya
- Died: 18 January 2026 (aged 87); Singapore
- Citizenship: Singaporean
- Education: University of New South Wales; Yale University
- Occupations: Architect; urban planner
- Known for: Master Plan of Singapore
- Spouse: Gretchen Gustafson (m. 1984)
- Children: 2
- Father: Liu Kang

Liu Thai Ker (Note: simplified Chinese: 刘太格; traditional Chinese: 劉太格; pinyin: Liú Tàigé) DUBC PJG PPA(E) (23 February 1938 – 18 January 2026) was a Singaporean architect and a master planner of the Urban Redevelopment Authority of Singapore. He was also involved in the urban planning of various cities in China since the 1980s.

== Early life and education ==
Liu was born on 23 February 1938 in Muar, Johor, when it was an Unfederated Malay State of the British. He was the eldest son of Liu Kang, a pioneer Nanyang Style artist. His family moved to Singapore after the conclusion of World War II. He studied in Chung Cheng High School, where he skipped a grade due to academic excellence. After graduating, he worked as a substitute teacher at Kong Hwa School in order to save money for further studies. He had plans to go to China to study art, but his mother convinced him to study architecture instead.

With the assistance of a donation from the Lee Foundation, he enrolled in the University of New South Wales in 1962, where he graduated with a first-class honours degree in architecture, and was also awarded a medal for being the top student. He furthered his studies at Yale University in 1965 with a masters in urban planning, where he was again awarded a medal for being the top student in the faculty.

== Career ==
During his time at Yale, Liu formed close relationships with his professors. One of them introduced Liu to I. M. Pei, who offered Liu a job at his firm. He also worked in Loder & Dunphy in Sydney.

Following Singapore's separation from Malaysia in 1965, Liu felt a desire to "change the fate of Singaporeans". He was approached by Teh Cheang Wan, the chief executive officer of the Housing and Development Board (HDB), and offered a job at HDB as head of the Design and Research Unit. In 1969, Liu returned to Singapore and joined HDB. While heading the research unit, he led efforts to standardise the guidelines for the building types, floor spaces, the number of rooms within each flat as well as room sizes. His team would also investigate architectural designs such as introducing slanted surfaces below the roof to mitigate the issue of rain entering open windows and optimising building orientation and placements to minimise sunlight exposure for apartment buildings of varying heights. He eventually became HDB's CEO in 1979. Throughout his time in HDB, he had oversaw the development of 20 new towns and 500,000 residential units. In 1989, he moved to the Urban Redevelopment Authority (URA) as its CEO and chief planner, where his contributions included the revision of its Concept Plan.

After Deng Xiaoping became the leader of China in 1978, he visited Singapore and Liu made an impression on him describing the urban planning done by Singapore. Thereafter in the 1980s, Liu begun to help China plan their cities through Singapore's government with his first commission for Fuzhou, the capital of Fujian province.

In 1992, Liu left public service to join RSP Architects Planners & Engineers (RSP) as a director. During this time, he designed Marina Bay Cruise Centre Singapore and the Chinese Cultural Centre. In the same year, Liu and businessman Edgar Cheng were respectively appointed as planner and business advisors of Ningbo city in China. Through the next 40 years since his first commission in China, he had participated in 40 urban planning projects in China, and did city planning for more than fifty cities. Then Fuzhou party secretary Xi Jinping, impressed by his city plan, approached him to design Fuzhou Changle International Airport. Liu had advised various cities' authorities there to keep historic areas such as Sanfang Qixiang in Fuzhou, a neighbourhood of historic shophouses on Xiamen Island, and ordered clean ups for Min River in Fujian and Yundang Lake in Xiamen on the basis that these locations would serve as great tourism attractions in the future.

He served as the founding chairman of the Centre for Liveable Cities, a policy institute on urban development and environmental management established in 2008 by Singapore's National Development and the Environment and Water Resources ministries. In December 2017, at the age of 79, Liu left RSP to found Morrow Architects and Planners, named after his father's artistic studio.

In 2024, Liu was working as an urban planning adviser to Fiji as well as the Chinese provinces of Sichuan and Guangdong.

== Personal life ==
Liu was the son of Liu Kang. He married Gretchen Gustafson, an American journalist, in 1984. They had two children, Daniel and Kristin.

Daniel was a People's Action Party (PAP) candidate for Aljunied Group Representation Constituency in the 2025 general election. The PAP team lost to Pritam Singh and his Workers' Party (WP) team with 40.29% of the vote.

Liu died on 18 January 2026, at the age of 87, after developing complications from a fall the previous week.

== Awards and honours ==
Liu was awarded:

- Public Administration Medal (Gold) 1976
- Meritorious Service Medal 1985
- Singapore Institute of Architects Gold Medal
- Medal of the City of Paris, France (2001)
- Asean Achievement Award for Outstanding Contributions to Architecture (1993)
- Honorary Doctorate, University of New South Wales
