= Tay Bee Aye =

Singaporean contemporary artist

Tay Bee Aye (郑美爱)
- Born: February 28, 1958 (age 68); Singapore
- Education: LASALLE College of the Arts
- Known for: Installation art
- Awards: Honorable Mention, Philip Morris Singapore Art Award; Commendation Award, Singapore Power Ltd Art Competition

Tay Bee Aye (Chinese: 郑美爱; pinyin: Zhèng Měiài) is a multidisciplinary Singaporean contemporary artist known for her soft sculptures and interactive installations. She has done pioneering work in interactive contemporary art for children in Singapore, with her practice expanding to include community involvement. She has exhibited at numerous art festivals and events, including the Singapore Biennale 2013.

== Education and personal life ==
Born the third of seven children, Tay initially could not afford an art education, first working to support her family after finishing her Cambridge GCE O Level Examinations. Only during her career did she have opportunities to travel internationally. In 1997, Tay quit her job as an accounts executive to study art full-time at LASALLE-SIA College of the Arts, under the Georgette Chen Art Scholarship funded by the college.

== Career ==
By the time Tay graduated in 1999, she had participated in several arts activities and festivals, such as the 2000 and 2004 Art Festival projects at Clifford Pier for Tracking Time, as well as the exhibition, Reconstruction of a City, at St James Power Station. In 1998, Tay received a Commendation Award at the Singapore Power Ltd Art Competition, and in 1999 and 2002, two Honorable Mentions at the Philip Morris Singapore Art Award.

In 2002, her installation of 600 small, handcrafted lip-shaped fabric cushions were on display at the atrium of Suntec City, as part of the Nokia Singapore Art 2001 exhibition. The installation was well-received, though with many of the small cushions being stolen by the public during the exhibition period. In Tay's series, Her World, featured in her second solo exhibition in 2005, Tay critiques the representations of women in media produced by the fashion and beauty industry. Her sculpture, Caterpillar, was a 15-metre long and 2.3-metre high steel sculpture lined with 30 poster boxes; commissioned under a partnership programme between National Arts Council and City Developments Ltd. Tay emphasises the presence of caterpillars as indicators of environmental degradation, with sightings more uncommon due to urbanisation.

In 2013, Tay's installation Knot, Play, Rest was featured in the 2013 Singapore Biennale. It encouraged people to come together to "meet, communicate and play", in a fabric rope playground of the artist's construction.

At the 2013 Committee of Supply Debate at the Parliament, her work with the Asian Women's Welfare Association (AWWA) received mention at a speech delivered by Acting Minister Lawrence Wong.

== Major exhibitions ==
Dates	Title	Location
Jan 2005	Her World	Utterly Art; Singapore
Apr 29 – May 25, 2005	Now & Then	Instinc Gallery; Singapore
Sep 15 – Oct 6, 2007	LIMITED / UNLIMITED: The 27th Anniversary Exhibition of the Printmaking Society Singapore	Tyler Print Institute; Singapore
Nov 20 – Nov 30, 2007	Have you ever smell the rain	Forth Art Gallery; Singapore
Oct 26, 2013 – Feb 16, 2014	Singapore Biennale 2013	Our Museum @ Taman Jurong; Singapore
