= Ruben Pang =

Singaporean artist

Ruben Pang is an artist from Singapore. He graduated from LASALLE College of the Arts in 2010 and held his first solo show at Chan Hampe Galleries in 2011. He is renowned for his ethereal paintings on aluminium.

Pang has received the Winston Oh Travelogue Award, the Georgette Chen Arts Scholarship, and was shortlisted for the Sovereign Asian Art Prize.

In 2015 Pang was selected as the inaugural artist-in-residence launched by the Tiroche DeLeon Collection in Jaffa, Israel.

== Selected exhibitions ==
2015, Ataraxy, Chan Hampe Galleries, Singapore

Ataraxy, Ruben Pang's fifth solo exhibition, extracts creative energy from disarray and entropy, thus realising the state of tranquility the term implies. In each painting, various artistic personalities find themselves in psychodramatic scenarios with their subconscious drives personified through figures in constant change, sometimes playing host to parasitic vegetation, other times surgically reconfigured and twisted into conversations with one another and their surroundings.

2013, New Energetics: Inverting the Process, Chan Hampe Galleries, Singapore

Featuring a series of canvases and sculptures, New Energetics: Inverting the Process departs from his earlier Futurist vision of split personalities and psychic schisms, and allows for the recollection of the past through the present. The pictures are not self-portraits in the literal sense, but are a compilation of combined memories; the forms and figures in the paintings are never planned. Each image morphs into another during the process, circulating everyday visual stimuli, from film scenes, paintings, and mythology, into characters that become symbolic while remaining faceless.

2013, Aetheric Portraiture, Primae Noctis Art Gallery, Lugano, Switzerland

2011, Angels, Chan Hampe Galleries, Singapore

Pang describes these paintings as projections of his psyche which reflect on notions of prospect, arrival, and transformation. With no preconceived directives on how the painting should look at its inception, Pang's process of creation evolves and gradually builds up with each brushstroke and layering of paint. Through his use of a multi-colour palette and technique, the artist aims to create a feeling of dynamism within the medium while exploring the boundaries of colour, form and transparency.
