= Sun Yee =

Singaporean painter (1919–2010)

- Born: 1919; Zhejiang, China
- Died: May 2, 2010 (aged 90–91); Tan Tock Seng Hospital, Singapore
- Education: Xinhua Art Academy; Nihon University; Académie de la Grande Chaumière

Sun Yee (Chinese: 沈雁; pinyin: Shěn Yàn; 1919 – 2 May 2010) was a prominent Zhejiang-born painter and arts educator who settled down in Singapore in 1954. She held close to 100 exhibitions and went on three separate world tours. She spent nearly three decades as the first and only principal of the Singapore Academy of Arts.

== Early life and education ==
Sun Yee was born in Zhejiang, China in 1919. She studied at the Xinhua Art Academy in Shanghai and the Nihon University in Tokyo. She then left for France, where she studied under painter, sculptor and filmmaker Fernand Léger. While in Paris, she also studied at the Académie de la Grande Chaumière. She and her family moved from Shanghai to Tokyo before the Chinese Communist Revolution.

== Career ==
Five of Sun's paintings were accepted to be exhibited at the 1953 Salon de Beaux Arts held in Paris. One of her works was also placed on permanent display at the Paris City Authority Gallery. On 14 May 1954, over 100 of her works were placed on display at a three-day exhibition sponsored by the China Society, held at the Singapore Chinese Chamber of Commerce building and opened by Yap Pheng Geck. The exhibition, which was her first in Singapore, was the eighth in her career, and featured her Falling Flowers on the Water, valued at $1,400, as the centrepiece. Another work, titled Snow, was valued at $1,200. By 1957, her works had also been exhibited in Kuala Lumpur. From June to July 1957, she held an exhibition at the Singapore Chamber of Commerce building which displayed around 100 of her works. It was officially opened by business magnate Loke Wan Tho on 29 June. In 1961, she held a travelling exhibition aboard the Messageries Maritimes liner that called at Ho Chi Minh City, Hong Kong, Kobe and Yokohama before arriving in Singapore on 1 June. The exhibition was sponsored by the Messageries Maritimes, the Alliance Française de Singapour and the China Society. French consul-general Paul Le Mintier De Lehelec and China Society president Lee Siow Mong were among the exhibition's visitors upon the vessel's return to Singapore. Sun also presented the Japanese Minister of Culture and Education with a painting of hers.

Sun spent much of her time travelling across Southeast Asia, with her travels serving as inspiration for her art. In 1963, she held the Flowers of Nanyang exhibition, which displayed ink paintings depicting flowers of the region. In July 1963, she held an exhibition at the Victoria Memorial Hall, displaying over 200 of her paintings. It was officially opened by Ko Teck Kin, who was then the president of the Singapore Chinese Chamber of Commerce, and half of the proceeds from the sales of the paintings were to be donated to the building fund of the Singapore Academy of Arts. In December, she held a five-day exhibition in Ipoh featuring 200 of her works. She also presented Idris Al-Mutawakil Alallahi Shah of Perak, then the Sultan of Perak, with a painting of the Istana Iskandariah. Pleased with the artwork, the Sultan in turn presented her with some of his own oil paintings, which she complimented. In August 1964, she held a four-day exhibition at the Kuala Lumpur and Selangor Chinese Assembly Hall which featured 150 Chinese and Western-styled paintings done with either oil or Chinese ink. It was opened by then-Minister of Finance Tan Siew Sin.

Sun embarked on her first world tour in September 1964. Over eight months, her works were exhibited in Paris at the Bernheim-Jeune, Brussels, Geneva, Berlin, New York City, Washington, D.C. and São Paulo. By then, she had already held 27 exhibitions for her works. In March 1966, she held her 34th exhibition, which featured over 100 of her works, which were either pieces of Chinese calligraphy or oil paintings. The exhibition, which was held at the Singapore Chinese Chamber of Commerce building and officially opened by Soon Peng Yam, who was then the chamber's president, was jointly sponsored by the China Society, the British Council, the Alliance Française de Singapour, the Chinese YMCA, the Euro-American Alumni Association, the Society of Chinese Artists, the YWCA of Singapore and the Singapore Academy of Arts. Yitan fengyun, an anthology of eight of her essays, was published in the same year. In July 1968, she held exhibitions in both Bangkok, Thailand and Phnom Penh, Cambodia. The exhibition in Bangkok was officially opened by Ho Rih Hwa, then the Singaporean ambassador to Thailand, while the exhibition in Cambodia was opened by Ernest Steven Monteiro, then the Singaporean ambassador to Cambodia.

During Sun's second world tour, which she went on from 1971 to 1972, she held exhibitions in São Paulo, Japan, Jamaica and Hawaii. From 24 February to 3 March 1973, she held an exhibition in the lobby of the Hotel Phoenix on Somerset Road. It was officially opened by the then-Singaporean Minister for Foreign Affairs S. Rajaratnam. By then, she had held over 50 exhibitions, and had come to realise that her Chinese-style paintings were more popular than her European-style paintings overseas. During her first two world tours, Sun painted over 100 artworks. In March 1980, she held an exhibition at the Antipodes Gallery, housed in the Hope Gibbons Building in Wellington, New Zealand. The works on display depicted scenes of Singapore, as well as scenes of her trip to New Zealand at the end of 1979. She also announced that she would soon be leaving Singapore on a third world tour. The trip was to last five months and would cover smaller cities in South America, Africa and several islands in the Pacific. She planned to paint another 100 paintings during the trip. She returned from this trip the following year.

In November 1997, Sun held her 93rd exhibition at the Orchard Point Exhibition Hall. Co-organised by long-time friend Johnny Yu of the Dynasties Antique and Art Gallery and the Federation of Arts Societies Singapore, the exhibition was her first in four years. She was also an amateur Peking opera actress. She performed for many years with Ping Sheh, a local Peking opera group.

=== Teaching ===
Sun served as the first and only principal of the Singapore Academy of Arts, which the China Society established in 1957. She also led the academy's art courses, which were initially held at the Singapore Culture Centre, as the academy did not have its own premises. The academy initially performed well, with some of its students furthering their arts education in Paris. However, it suffered from a lack of funding and was only able to hold weekend and evening classes. Throughout the 1970s, Sun made several unsuccessful public appeals for more financial support for the institution, which would allow it to have a permanent home. However, the lack of funding meant that plans for a permanent location for the school never materialised. The academy organised its last class in 1983, and the fund which supported it was cancelled in 1987, thus closing the academy.

Sun spent several years teaching art at the Teachers' Training College. She also taught at the Tanjong Pagar Community Club until 1995, when her health began to decline. Prominent students of hers included Amy Lakides, Yau Tian Yau, Yeo Kim Seng, Lim Hwee Tiong, Tong Chin Sye, Eng Siak Loy, Wee Kong Chai, Lim Kang Kee and Yeo Kim Seng.

== Personal life and death ==
Sun could speak Mandarin, French, Japanese and English. She never married, and lived in a flat in Katong. In 1997, she injured her head and her left eye in a fall, temporarily preventing her from being able to paint. Fellow artist Liu Kang, who was a friend of hers, described her as "outwardly refined and inwardly intelligent", as well as "lively and quick-witted, fluent yet reserved, noble and pure in spirit." He also praised her "firm" foundation in sketching and her "excellent artistic self-cultivation."

In 2000, Sun was diagnosed with Parkinson's disease. She lived in Katong with a domestic helper in her later years. Two or three years before her death, she moved to a nursing home. On 1 May 2010, she was admitted to Tan Tock Seng Hospital, where she died the next day. Following her death, over 300 works of hers came into the possession of her niece, who co-organised an exhibition with Johnny Yu showcasing the paintings in 2014. Half of the proceeds of the exhibition were donated to the St. Luke's Hospital. Sun's niece eventually gave Yu most of the remaining paintings. In 2017, she donated the last 31 Sun paintings in her possession to the National Kidney Foundation Singapore. The remaining paintings, along with 39 paintings donated by Yu, were placed on display at an exhibition to raise funds for the charity.

From March to May 2023, Yu held an exhibition on the second floor of the Pan Pacific Singapore showcasing 80 of her works on rotation. In the same year, Low Sze Wee, then the CEO of the Singapore Chinese Cultural Centre, wrote an article for the SPH-owned e-magazine ThinkChina noting that Sun is "little-known today in Singapore beyond a small circle of art historians, peers and former students." He attributed this to the "mixed legacy" of the Singapore Academy of Arts.
