= Steve Lu =

Chinese-born painter (born 1919)

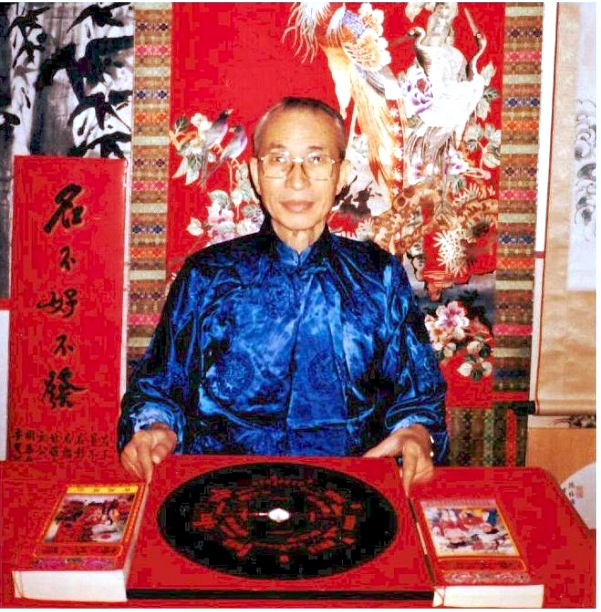
Steve Lu in 1987

Steve Lu or Lu Xingfu (Chinese: 陆行夫; born February 13, 1919) is a Chinese-born artist. A student of Zhang Daqian and Pu Ru, Lu was trained in Chinese traditional art and calligraphy, collectively known as guohua or "traditional painting".

Lu's additional formal training in Western art allowed him to create both impressionistic and expressionistic forms. He was ease with both classical and experimental styles and combined both Chinese and Western methods.

He is also a seal carver, an author, an art historian, Feng Shui practitioner, astrologer, and geomancer. Lu produced numerous works of modern and traditional Chinese art as he migrated from China to Taiwan to Singapore,

== Biography ==
Born in Jiangsu Province, China, Lu started to experiment with art when he was four and his formal training began at six. Starting with calligraphy as his foundation, Lu's talents were discovered and guided by the Chinese calligrapher, Wang Xiechen. Lu's older brother, also an artist, guided him on decorative design. Lu later joined Central University of Nanjing to expand his artistic repertoire to include Western painting.

Pu Ru was one of Lu's teachers. Pu was a supporter of Lu and contributed a calligraphy of the Chinese title of Lu's book, "Face Painting in Chinese Opera." Additionally, Pu dedicated a painting to Lu. Another teacher, Yu Youren, a calligrapher, also dedicated a calligraphy to Lu.

When Zhang Daqian visited Singapore in 1956, he spent an entire month with Lu to share some art insights and skills including Zhang's famous "three whites" of Chinese beauties. "Three whites" refer to the parts of the face where there are no colors such as the forehead, nose and chin. Zhang, an animal lover and pet owner of several different types of monkeys, guided Lu on the techniques of painting monkeys. According to Zhang, the secret to painting monkeys is not in the monkeys, but the trees they climb on.

Zhang visited Singapore again in 1963 when Lu was a patron for Zhang's exhibition. During that time, Zhang autographed and gave Lu his photo with Picasso during their 1956 summit meeting in Nice, France. Zhang also gave Lu a calligraphy to commemorate their personal friendship.

Wu Zishen, who dedicated a calligraphy to Lu in 1967, said: "Steve Lu, the great art teacher of artists, unites the best of ancient and modern Chinese and western art." Wu (1893–1972), the founder of Suzhou Art Academy in 1928, was an artist, calligrapher and poet. He was also a doctor of the traditional Chinese school of medicine.

== Artistic career ==
Lu's calligraphy works include various ancient rudimentary calligraphy styles. Those were written on tortoiseshell and bone in the Shang Dynasty (16–11th century BC) or on metal or stone. His calligraphy ranged from a "square style" of writing to scrawl and modern styles such as xingshu (running style) and caoshu (cursive style).

An example of Lu's unorthodox approach is his 3,420 variations of 福 or fu, "good fortune." For years, Lu studied how calligraphers wrote this word. In his exploration, Lu found new ways of writing it by combining the left radical of the word by Wang Xizhi (a calligrapher in the Jin dynasty (266–420)) with the right component of the word by Su Dongpo (writer, AD 1036–1101). After spending decades developing and writing them, Lu finally completed the artwork of 3,420 variants of fu in 12 paintings in 1984.

Lu has also specialized in seal carving. This requires in-depth research into original Chinese characters dating as far back as the Han and Qin dynasties. The most challenging aspect of this art form is the ability to view things in reverse. As young as six years old, Lu started studying the art of seal carving. By nine, he was using his own seals on his paintings. By 12, Lu sold his first carved seal. Since then, Lu has carved seals for many world leaders such as Queen Elizabeth, President Reagan, Prime Minister Thatcher, and the UN Secretary-General, Kurt Waldheim.

Lu's style in figure painting is a fusion of traditional brush strokes including sanbai taught by Zhang as well as Western figure drawing. Later, Lu turned his attention to the study of dunhuang (敦煌), a type of popular ancient Chinese paintings. He developed a style that re-created various female religious figures from the Dunhuang caves as well as other mythological female figures and goddesses such as Guanyin.

== Lu's works ==
=== Publications ===
- Face Painting in Chinese Opera (1968), a book on the symbolism of face painting
- Illustrations for the Malay edition of The Good Earth (1963) by the Nobel Prize winning author Pearl S. Buck
- Practical Art Design (1956), a book for beginners to encourage their studies of art
- Folk Painting Album (1951), a bound volume of cartoons originally published in the Chinese Folk Painting Magazine in Formosa, now Taiwan

Lu's paintings span multiple genres:

- Traditional Chinese maiden figures and famous classical and legendary characters
- Religious figures – Buddha and Guanyin (Quan Yin) and mythical beings such as the Eight Immortals
- Animals – horses, tigers, dragons, fishes, birds, and monkeys
- Flora – bamboos, peonies, and orchids
- Serene Chinese landscapes

=== Exhibitions ===
- 1967 April – Chinese Chamber of Commerce, Singapore
- 1967 December – National Library of Singapore, Singapore
- 1974 August – Organized by Metro Holdings etc., Singapore
- 1975 September – Fundraiser for St. Andrew's Hospital, Victoria Memorial Hall, Singapore
- 1975 November – National Library of Singapore, Singapore
- 1976 April – Za Huo Hang Hall, Ipoh, Malaysia
- 1976 June – Dewan Sri Pinang, George Town, Malaysia
- 1976 December – Johor Bahru Chinese Heritage Museum, Johor Bahru, Malaysia
- 1978 January – Friends of Art Exhibition, Chinese Chamber of Commerce, Singapore
- 1986 March – Chinese Calligraphy, Cathay Art Gallery, Singapore
- 1987 November – Dragon & Fish Paintings & Calligraphy Exhibition, Cathay Art Gallery, Singapore
- 1988 January–February – Central Atrium, Raffles City, Singapore
- 1988 November – International Art Exhibition, Hunan, China

=== Art events and commercial projects ===
- 1940 – Winner of Kiangsu dragon-painting competition, China
- 1946 – Dragon painting for Nanking Shanghai Department Store Ltd., China
- 1968 – Dragon painting for Hong Leong Finance Ltd.
- 1970 – Album cover design for a music records company
- 1973 – Large welcoming banner for a press event by Rollei Camera
- 1975 – Dragon painting for American Express International Banking Corporation
- 1975 – Dragon painting for HSBC, Singapore
- 1976 – Galloping Horse painting for Guinness Stout
- 1978 – Dragon painting for Far East magazine
- 1982 – “Majulah Singapura” painting for the lobby of Hong Kong Bank, HSBC, Singapore
- 1986 – Flying Horse painted for DHL International
- 1994 – Calendar designed for Cape PLC with Lu's original calligraphy
- 1999 – Dragon painting for Deutsche Bank

== See also ==
- Zhang Daqian
- Pu Ru
- Yu Youren
- Liu Haisu
