= Chen Jen Hao =

Singaporean educator and artist (1908–1976)

Chen Jen Hao (1908 – 28 October 1976) was an educator and a pioneering artist in Singapore.

== Early life and education ==
Chen was born in Fuzhou, China, in 1908. He attended the First Government Middle School, and later the Pootung High School in Shanghai. He began studying art at the Shanghai College of Fine Arts in 1926, where he met and befriended Liu Kang, who would also go on to become an art pioneer in Singapore. From 1928 to 1932, he studied at the Beaux-Arts de Paris. While he studied at the institution, his works were displayed at the Salon d'Automne. Liu Haisu, the principal of the Shanghai College of Fine Arts, who was visiting Europe at the time, invited Chen to teach at the college after viewing his works at the Salon d'Automne.

== Career ==
After graduating from the Beaux-Arts de Paris in 1932, Chen returned to Shanghai and became a professor at the Shanghai College of Fine Arts in 1933. However, following the Japanese invasion of China in 1937, he fled to Malaysia and began teaching at the Muar Chung Hwa High School. Following the end of World War II, he became the school's principal. In 1959, he became the principal of the Kallang West Government Chinese Middle School in Singapore. He continued to serve as the school's principal as the school moved to Dunman Road and was renamed the Dunman Government Chinese Middle School. After retiring in 1969, he was awarded the Public Administration Medal (silver) during the 1970 National Day Awards.

In Malaysia, Chen was the president of the Chinese School Teachers Association of Muar, a committee member of the State of Johore Chinese School Managers and Teachers' Association and the Malaya Chinese Teachers' Union, and an examination committee member of the Standard Curriculum and Chinese Text Book of the Ministry of Education, Malaya. In Singapore, He was the president of the Singapore Chinese Middle School Teachers' Union and the Katong District Singapore Sports Council, an examination committee member for the student grant of the Singapore Polytechnic and the Standard of Art lesson of the Ministry of Education, and the vice-chairman and judge of the National Day Art Exhibition's working committee.

Chen was a member of the Society of Chinese Artists. He became the society's president in 1970. He also taught at the Nanyang Academy of Fine Arts and served as the honorary advisor to the Lee Kong Chian Museum of Asian Art at the Nanyang University. In 1984, then Parliamentary Secretary for Education Ho Kah Leong opened a four-day exhibition of Chen's calligraphy and paintings at the National Museum of Singapore.

== Death ==
On 26 October 1976, Chen underwent an appendicitis operation at the Singapore General Hospital due to a perforated appendix, during which surgeon Lo Chiung Min accidentally removed a piece of fat from Chen, having mistaken it for the appendix. Chen died two days later, and an inquiry from pathologist Wee Keng Poh concluded that he had died of septic poisoning, which might not have occurred if the appendix had been removed during the surgery.
