= Sijil Kemuliaan =

Singaporean award

Sijil Kemuliaan (Certificate of Honour)
- Type: Decoration
- Established: 19 April 1962; 64 years ago
- Country: Singapore
- Eligibility: Singaporeans
- Awarded for: Service to the State
- Status: Active

Precedence
- Next (higher): Darjah Utama Nila Utama
- Next (lower): Darjah Utama Bakti Cemerlang
- Ribbon after 1996 Ribbon prior to 1996

The Sijil Kemuliaan (English: Certificate of Honour) is a decoration instituted in 1962. It is typically awarded to Singaporeans, but in special circumstances may be awarded to foreigners as an honorary award (i.e. the Honorary Certificate of Honour).

The medal of the award bears the inscription Kerana Jasa Untok Negara which translates to "For Services to the State" in Malay. There are currently no living recipients of the award in Singapore. Recipients of the honour are entitled to use the post-nominal letters SK.

== History ==
The Sijil Kemuliaan was instituted on 19 April 1962. The rules of the award were revised in July 1996.

== Recipients ==
As of 2022, there are only three recipients.

- Lim Hak Tai – Founder of the Nanyang Academy of Fine Arts (NAFA).
- Wong Peng Soon – Malayan/Singaporean badminton player.
- Zubir Said – Singaporean composer, which included the national anthem of the country.
