= Dawn Ng =

Singaporean artist

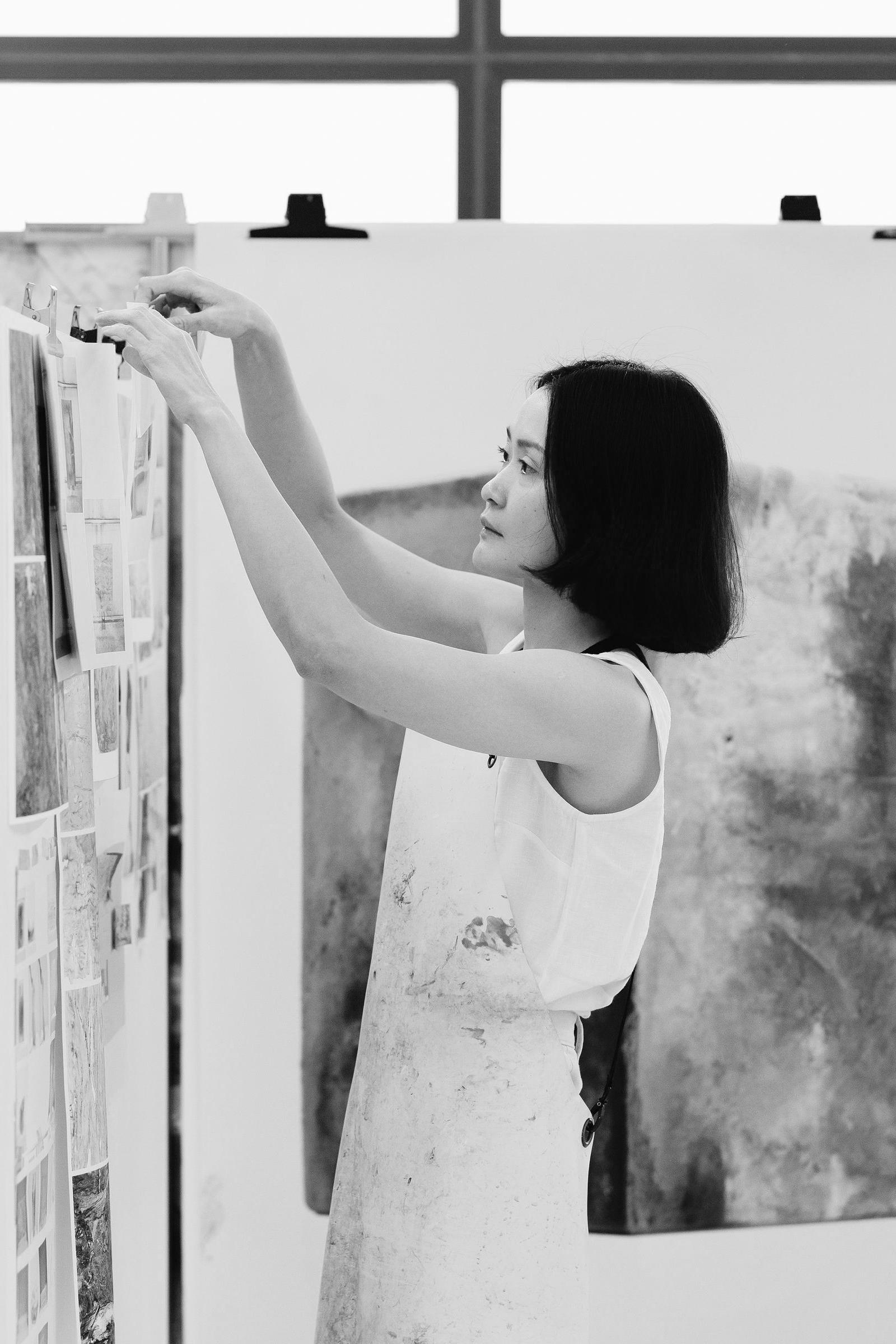
- Ng working in her studio

Dawn Ng (born 1982) is a visual artist from Singapore who works across a diverse breadth of mediums, motives and scale ranging from text, illustration, collage, light, sculpture to large scale installations. Her work primarily deals with time, memory, and the ephemeral.

Dawn was part of the Jeju Biennale in 2017, participated in the inaugural Art Basel Hong Kong with her solo, SIXTEEN, followed by A Thing of Beauty, at the Art Paris Art Fair at the Grand Palais in 2015. She has also shown in Sydney, Shanghai, and Jakarta.

== Education ==
Dawn Ng majored in Journalism and Studio Art at Georgetown University in Washington D.C., and the Slade School of Fine Art in London.

== Career ==
Well known for her ubiquitous Walter series that garnered attention for its controversial guerilla content and form, the work was acquired into the permanent collection of the Singapore Art Museum, included in Open Sea at the 2015 Musée d'art contemporain de Lyon which explored the contemporary Art scene of Southeast Asia. In 2019, the artist was commissioned to fill a wing of the Art Science Museum for their Floating Utopias exhibition.

In 2016 Ng was commissioned by the Fondation d'enterprise Hermes to inaugurate their Singapore flagship's art gallery with a solo installation, How to Disappear into a Rainbow as the store reopened in Liat Towers, Singapore. Most recently the artist opened a commissioned solo at the Asian Civilisations Museum in 2020.

She is represented by Sullivan+Strumpf, Singapore.

== Solo exhibitions ==
- 2011, Walter, Singapore Art Museum
- 2012, Everything You Ever Wanted Is Right Here, Chan Hampe Galleries, Singapore

This series of photographs by Dawn Ng features a colossal bunny named Walter that pops up across Singapore's standard landscape of flats and heartland enclaves. By placing Walter at various spots in Singapore and photographing these scenarios in which the giant rabbit contrasts with his environment, the artist encourages people to re-examine overlooked places, local sites, and sights.

- 2013, Sixteen, Art Basel Hong Kong

Sixteen is an installation of 16 wooden chests built in a spectrum of colors. These chests are crafted to resemble treasure boxes, which fit one inside the other — the largest, the size of an oversized antique travel trunk, down to the smallest, the size of a musical box. Each chest is labeled both on the outside and on the inside with brass-engraved plaques, whose texts relate to the colour of it.

- 2015, A Thing of Beauty, Art Paris Art Fair

The photographic series A Thing of Beauty captures installations of small, locally sourced objects, collected from a range of stores in residential Singapore – from bakeries to convenience stores.

- 2016, How to Disappear into a Rainbow, Hermes Aloft Gallery, Singapore
- 2018, Perfect Stranger, Chan + Hori Contemporary, Singapore
- 2018, Perfect Stranger, Sullivan+Strumpf, Sydney
- 2019, 11, Telok Ayer Arts Club, Singapore
- 2020, Monument Momento, Sullivan+Strumpf, S.E.A Focus, Singapore
- 2021, Into Air, Sullivan+Strumpf, Singapore

== Group exhibitions ==
- 2017, Dorothy, Jeju Biennale, Korea
- 2019, Waterfall I, Sullivan+Strumpf, Westbund Art & Design, Shanghai
- 2020, Merry-Go-Round, Twenty Twenty Art Show, Singapore
