= See Hiang To =

Chinese artist

See Hiang To (1906 - 25 April 1990) was a pioneering artist in Chinese painting, calligraphy and seal-carving in Singapore.

== Early life ==
See was born in 1906 in Longhai, Fujian. He was taught Chinese ink painting and literature by his father and grandfather from a young age.

== Career ==
He held his first solo exhibition, which was organised by the Singapore Leong Khay Huay Kuan Bursary to raise relief funds for China, in 1940. He became a teacher at the Nanyang Academy of Fine Arts in 1941. He held his second solo exhibition in 1970. In 1973, he was awarded the Bintang Bakti Masyarakat for his contributions to art in Singapore. He became the president of the Society of Chinese Artists in 1976 and held the role for a year, before becoming the society's vice-president in 1978, a role he held until 1981. His third and final solo exhibition was held in 1983.

== Death ==
See died on 25 April 1990. After his death, his seals were donated to the Nanyang Academy of Fine Arts by his son.
