= Lim Cheng Hoe =

Singaporean artist (1912–1979)

- 林清河
- Born: 24 May 1912; Amoy, Fujian Province, Republic of China
- Died: 3 September 1979 (aged 67); Singapore
- Education: Self-taught; formal art instruction by Richard Walker, art teacher in Raffles Institution
- Known for: Watercolour
- Awards: 1927: Lim Boon Keng Gold Medal for Art; 1947: Highly Commended Award (Watercolour section), Annual Inter-School Art Exhibition; 1960: Perayaan Hari Kebangsaan Certificate; 1968: Singapore Festival certificate 1972: National Day Art Exhibition Certificate; 1974: National Day Art Exhibition Certificate.

Lim Cheng Hoe (Chinese: 林清河; pinyin: Lín Qīng Hé; Pe̍h-ōe-jī: Lîm Tshing-hô; 24 May 1912 – 3 September 1979) was a Singaporean watercolourist recognised as one of the key pioneer artists in Singapore, along with his peers like Cheong Soo Pieng and Chen Chong Swee. He was credited for the amalgamation of interest in watercolour art in the local art scene and in turn, the founding of the Singapore Watercolour Society. He also was a contrast from other pioneer artists schooled in mainstream Chinese art aesthetic culture, by being a product of Western art education and a primarily self-taught artist.

== Early life and career ==
Lim's first art teacher, Mr Richard Walker

Born in 1912, Lim's family moved to Singapore from Amoy when he was 7. As a boy, Lim loved to draw, and would continue to explore and experiment with his pencil day in day out. In 1928, he attended school at the Raffles Institution where he found first love with watercolour art, and received art instruction from Richard Walker, his school art teacher and the first Art Inspector of Schools in Singapore. On September 13, 1930, the 18-year-old submitted his artwork in the Design and Painting class in school, and was awarded First Prize in October 1930. After completing his Senior Cambridge Overseas School Certificate at end-1930, Lim went to China on a three-week vacation. In 1932 he passed the Junior London Chamber of Commerce Examination, and soon gained employment as a clerk at the Royal Naval Wireless Station in Kranji. He also continued to receive art instruction at Walker's Saturday art classes for the next three years. In 1936, Lim was employed as Chief Clerk at the Public Utilities Board, and got married in 1952 at the age of 30. He continued to work with the Board until his retirement in 1966.

== Art career ==
Throughout his active years Lim was a Sunday painter, painting outdoors at various locations in Singapore during weekends and with any spare time he could afford in between work and family life. But he was much more into serious painting, than just painting for leisure. By the time he started his working life at the Utilities Board, Lim stopped attending art classes by Richard Walker. Instead, he continued to experiment and explored new ways to express his art through watercolour. He was a severe critic of his own work, seldom satisfied with the quality of work he produced, and emphasized greatly on accuracy in his observation and draughtsmanship. In fact, it was important to Lim to paint directly from his subjects, and often take time to look around and compose them before selecting for the right pose / position to paint. This also applies to plein-air paintings with his friends, even if it meant for him to paint under the blazing sun. Lim also read widely and acquired books on art history, criticism and techniques. He also was a subscriber to an arts magazine titled The Artist: The Magazine For Artists, Instruction and Review which was indispensable to feeding his voracious appetite for knowledge in art. Yet he never felt he studied enough, or mastered the watercolour medium sufficiently. This self-discipline and endless pursuit in artistic excellence thus gained him the reputation as an outstanding Singaporean artist. Lim was a good-natured man with laughter following their painting group wherever they went. He was also generous man who often shared his knowledge, and the publications he acquired with his circle of artist friends.

He was never far from his wanderlust personality that he had developed from his schooldays. Lim had good physical health, and a deep passion for natural landscapes. In his weekends and whatever free time available with his friends, he would meet up with them on painting excursions in either T. Y. Choy's car, or in G. K. Tan's old Ford to search for sceneries to paint. On occasions, he would go on painting expeditions starting from Kampong Penjuru (current site of Eusoff Hall of the National University of Singapore), travelling up to Loyang area, and ending his day by the Singapore River. These trips enabled him to continuously revisit these inspiring landscapes and rediscover his art. Thoma Yeo remembered joining the Singapore River artists – as they have come to be known later in history – in 1957 when he was a young aspiring artist. As with every other Sundays Yeo would meet the group at the Red House along Bras Basah Road and the members would decide where they would go to paint. The Singapore River thus then became their favourite haunt to paint at, especially when the group cannot decide where else to paint at. Between 1958 and 1971 Lim, and the other Singapore River artists took their plein air painting excursions to various parts of Malaysia, especially to the state of Johor.

Lim died of stomach cancer in Changi General Hospital on September 3, 1979, after a six-year battle.

== Major exhibitions ==
Dates	Title	Location
March 5 – 30, 1986	The Lim Cheng Hoe Retrospective (Post-humous exhibition)	National Museum Art Gallery; Singapore
August 4 – 7, 1988	Works of the late Lim Cheng Hoe (Post-humous exhibition)	Orchard Point Exhibition Hall; Singapore
August 2, 2019 - January 5, 2020	Lim Cheng Hoe: Painting Singapore (Post-humous exhibition)	National Gallery; Singapore
