= Lim Hak Tai =

Singaporean artist (1893–1963)

- 林学大; SK
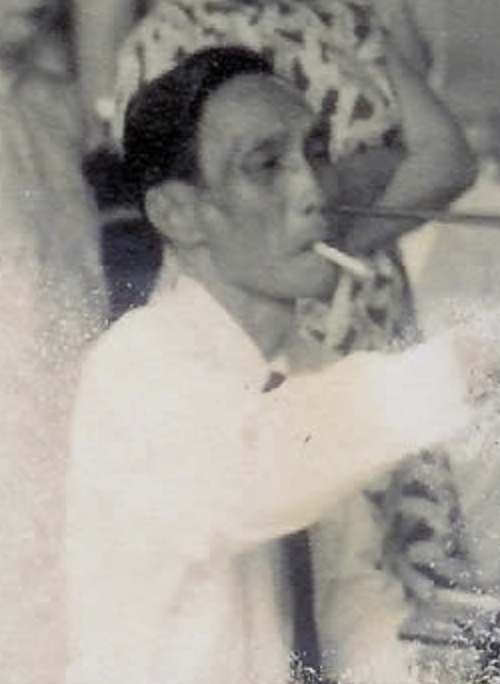
- Lim in 1949
- Born: 28 May 1893; Amoy (now Xiamen), Fujian, Qing China
- Died: 14 February 1963 (aged 69); Singapore
- Education: Fuzhou Provincial Art Teacher's Training College; Amoy Art Teacher's College
- Known for: Oil Painting, Drawing, Chinese ink painting,
- Awards: 1962: Sijil Kemuliaan (Certificate of Honour)

Lim Hak Tai, SK (simplified Chinese: 林学大; traditional Chinese: 林學大; pinyin: Lín Xué Dà; Pe̍h-ōe-jī: Lîm Ha̍k-tāi; 28 May 1893 – 14 February 1963) was one of Singapore's pioneer artist at the turn of the 20th century, and was the person who inspired the Nanyang School of art form, to reflect the 'Nanyang' (South-east Asia) region, both in painting style and subject matter.

== Early life and education ==
Lim was born on 28 May 1893 in Xiamen, Fujian Province, China. Lim left Xiamen in 1913 to study at Fuzhou, Fujian and graduated from the Fujian Provincial Teachers' Training College in 1916.

== Career ==
Bust of Lim at the Nanyang Academy of Fine Arts

After graduation, Lim returned to Xiamen and taught at various schools. In 1923, Lim co-founded the Xiamen Academy of Fine Arts with two other artists.

Lim came to Singapore at the outbreak of Second Sino-Japanese War in 1937, and taught art at The Chinese High School and Nan Chiau Girls High School for a year. In 1938, Lim and other artists founded Nanyang Academy of Fine Arts and he was appointed as its principal

Lim was a dedicated art educator and an accomplished painter in Singapore, and have taught many art students - some on to becoming accomplished Singaporean artists. He was also the first to articulate the notion of a 'Nanyang style' art that involved local and South-east Asian tropical representations using Western painting techniques. As such, Lim persuaded his peers Cheong Soo Pieng, Chen Wen Hsi, Chen Chong Swee and Liu Kang to seek inspiration from their Balinese excursion in 1952, developing what is known today as the Nanyang School of Painting.

Lim was conferred with the Sijil Kemuliaan (Certificate of Honour) for his outstanding achievements for the Academy, and the society on 3 June 1962. He was the first artist to be conferred the award by the Singapore Government. Lim died on 14 February 1963 due to lung cancer.

== Gallery ==
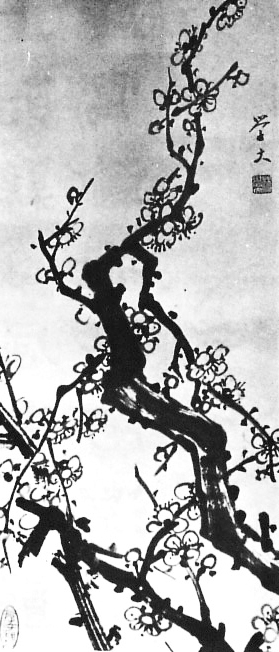
Lim Hak Tai painting

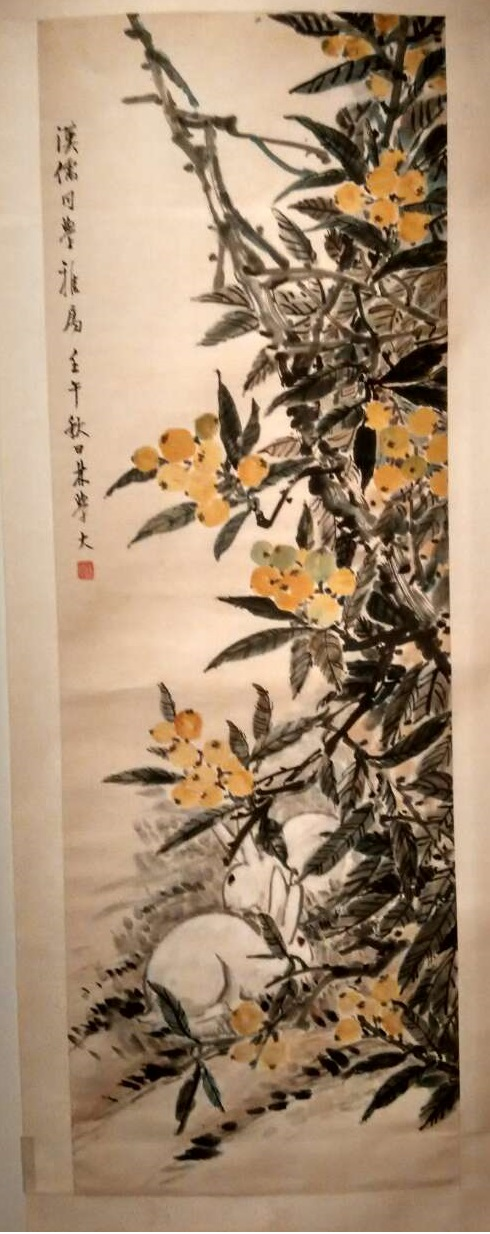
Singapore Art Museum

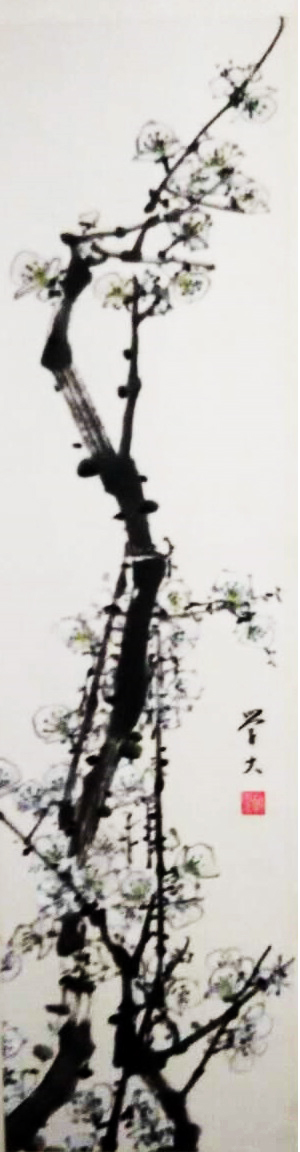
Lim Hak Tai painting follower

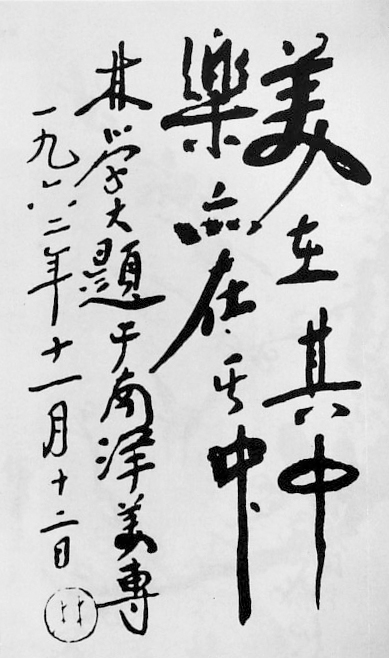
Lim Hak Tai calligraphy

== See also ==
- Chen Chong Swee
- Cheong Soo Pieng
- Liu Kang
- Georgette Chen
