= Chen Chong Swee =

Singaporean artist (1910–1985)

- 陈宗瑞
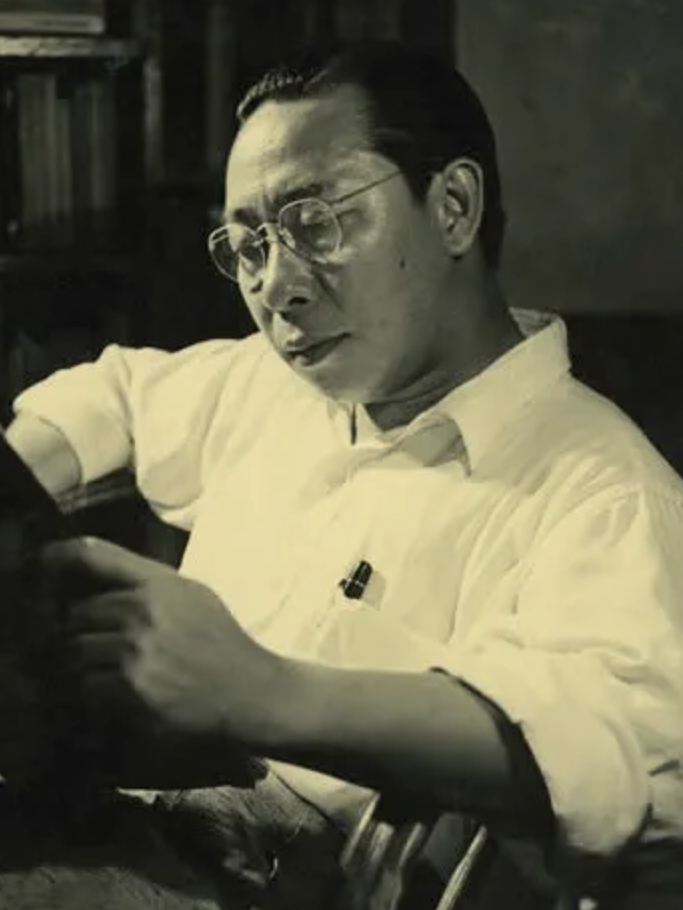
- Chen in 1954
- Born: 6 November 1910; Swatow, China
- Died: 15 February 1985 (aged 74); Singapore
- Education: Xinhua Academy of Fine Art, Shanghai
- Known for: Watercolour, Chinese Ink and wash painting, Oil painting
- Movement: Nanyang art style
- Awards: 1935: Cash prize, King George V Silver Jubilee art Exhibition; 1965: Public Service Starby the Government of Singapore.

Chen Chong Swee (simplified Chinese: 陈宗瑞; traditional Chinese: 陳宗瑞; pinyin: Chén Zōng Ruì) was a Singaporean watercolourist belonging to the pioneer generation of artists espousing the Nanyang-styled painting unique to Singapore, at the turn of the 20th century. He was also one of the first artists in Singapore to use Chinese ink painting techniques to render scenery and figurative paintings of local and Southeast Asian themes.

== Biography ==
Born in Swatow, Chen attended school at the Union High School in Swatow, China and graduated in 1929. He attended and graduated from Xinhua Academy of Fine Arts in 1931, and arrived in Singapore that same year. He taught art at various secondary schools, before becoming a lecturer of the Chinese ink painting department at the Nanyang Academy of Fine Arts. He advocated tradition in his Chinese ink painting style.

Chen's training in Xinhua firmly grounded him in traditional principles of Chinese painting. This also includes his inclination towards the ancient Chinese tradition of painting as "idea writing", using inscriptions to fortify the meanings of the paintings. At the same time he was convinced that the traditions of Chinese painting were ripe for reform and revision at that time, as art in Shanghai and China then saw the emergence of his peers experimenting Modernism with conventional principles in Chinese ink painting. He strongly believed that communicating art to the viewers is top priority in creating art, against the classic Modernist tenet that the innate subjectivism, sensibilities and concerns of the individual artist should always prevail over viewer accessibility.

In 1935 he co-founded the Salon Art Society (Singapore Society of Chinese Artists) and taught art in various schools in Singapore between 1936 and 1970. He also served on various advisory and management committees of art societies in Singapore. In 1969, he co-founded the Singapore Watercolour Society with artists like Lim Cheng Hoe, and Loy Chye Chuan, and served as the Society treasurer for many years. Chen died in 1986.

In 1952 Chen and fellow artists Cheong Soo Pieng, Chen Wen Hsi and Liu Kang, were persuaded by Lim Hak Tai to visit Bali to seek inspiration for their art. This gave to Pictures of Bali painting exhibition in the same year, which was organized by the four artists and showcasing the paintings they did during their stay on the Indonesian island. It also led to the development of what is known today as the Nanyang School of Painting.

== Legacy ==
On 15 January 1994 151 works of art by Chen, mainly Chinese ink paintings were donated by the Chen family estate, to the Chen Chong Swee Charity auction conducted by Singapore Sotheby's Auction House at the Empress Place Building. The charity drive aimed to raise S$1 million for a scholarship fund that benefits local visual artists. By the end of the auction a total of S$676,200 was made from the sale of 138 paintings during the auction, with more than 70 per cent of the collection sold above the minimum reserve price. The highest priced pieces Returning From The Sea and Trengganu Beach were sold for S$66,000 and S$16,000, respectively to two anonymous buyers. The money raised became the NAC-Chen Chong Swee Art Scholarship, in memory of this great artist and educator. This Scholarship awards aspiring artists with up to S$25,000 funding to pursue full-time postgraduate studies or research programmes overseas.

In March 1994, the Singapore Mint produced gold and silver ingots commemorating the late artist. The gold and silver ingots weigh 75g and 43g respectively, were printed with the artist's Drying Fish painting on one side, and the other with the portrait of the artist with his personalised signature and seal. These ingots were launched officially at the Reminiscence of Singapore Pioneer Art Masters art exhibition at the Takashimaya Art Gallery on 11 March 1994.

== See also ==
- Chen Wen Hsi
- Cheong Soo Pieng
- Georgette Chen
- Lim Hak Tai
- Liu Kang

== Bibliography ==
- (1994) Reminiscence of Singapore's pioneer art masters : Liu Kang, Cheong Soo Pieng, Chen Chong Swee, Chen Wen Hsi : 11–22 March 1994. Singapore : Singapore Mint.
- Sotheby & Co. (Singapore) (1994) Chen Chong Swee charity auction. Singapore : Sotheby's Singapore
- Chen, Chong Swee, 1910–1985 (1993) Chen Chong Swee : his thoughts, his art. Singapore : National Museum.
- National Museum of Singapore (1984) Chen Chong Swee retrospective. Singapore : Ministry of Culture.
- Chen, Chong Swee, 1910–1985 (1983) The paintings of Chen Chong Swee (陈宗瑞彩墨画集). Singapore : 南风美术社 (Nán Fēng Měi Shù Shè)
