= Chen Wen Hsi =

Singaporean artist (1906–1991)

- 陈文希
- Born: 9 September 1906; Guangdong, China
- Died: 17 December 1991 (aged 85); Singapore
- Education: Shanghai College of Art; Xinhua College of Art
- Known for: Oil painting, drawing, Chinese ink painting
- Notable work: Gibbons, 1977, Chinese ink and colour on paper, 190 × 488 cm, National Gallery Singapore Two Gibbons Amidst Vines, 1980s, Chinese ink and colour on paper, 49 × 70 cm, National Gallery Singapore (gift of Dr. Earl Lu) Squirrels amidst Autumn Leaves, 1980s, Chinese ink and colour on paper, 136 × 67 cm, formerly in the collection of Dr. Earl Lu
- Awards: 1964: Public Service Star; 1975: Honorary Doctor of Letters, National University of Singapore; 1980: Gold Medal, National Museum of History, Taipei; 1987: First ASEAN Cultural Ad Communication Award; 1992: Meritorious Service Medal (posthumous)

Chen Wen Hsi (simplified Chinese: 陈文希; traditional Chinese: 陳文希; pinyin: Chén Wénxī; 9 September 1906 – 17 December 1991) was a Chinese-born Singaporean artist, known for his avant-garde Chinese paintings.

== Early life and education ==
Chen was born in Jieyang, Guangdong, China, and had his early education at Chen Li Primary School and St. Joseph Middle School.

After graduation from secondary school, Chen decided to study full-time in fine art at the Shanghai College of Art in 1928, despite his uncle's objection. Unhappy with the college, Chen transferred to the Xinhua College of Art in Shanghai, where he was taught by renowned artists such as Pan Tianshou, with half of his classmates a year later. It was at Xinhua where he became acquainted with Chen Jen Hao, Chen Chong Swee and Liu Kang, all of whom were to become Singapore's Nanyang pioneer artists and art educationists. After four years at Xinhua, Chen graduated and returned to Jieyang.

== Career ==
After getting married in Jieyang, Chen went to Shantou in 1929, at the age of 21. His work was exhibited in Shanghai (1931, 1933) and Guangzhou (1932, 1936). In 1937, he received recognition and praise of Chinese painter Xu Beihong at the second Chinese National Art Exhibition in Nanjing. In the same year, an English arts magazine elected him as one of contemporary China's ten greatest artists. He left China in 1947 and had further exhibitions in Saigon (1948), Hong Kong (1949), Bangkok – Kuala Lumpur (1949), and Bangkok-Singapore (1950).

In 1948, Chen arrived in Singapore, where he originally planned to stay for not more than three months. After his visa expired he was convinced by fellow artists such as Liu Kang, and then commissioner general Malcolm MacDonald to stay.

In Singapore, he proceeded to teach art at The Chinese High School (1949–1968) and the Nanyang Academy of Fine Arts (1951–1959). Chen travelled to various places in Southeast Asia to collect drawing materials during his vacations, and he was especially inspired by the people and customs of Bali and Java. In June 1955, Chen took part in a seven-artist group exhibition organised by the Singapore Art Society.

In 1968, Chen retired from teaching, and decided to concentrate on drawing. Between 1923 and 1992, he conducted 38 one-man exhibitions in Singapore and other countries such as China, Taiwan, Malaysia, Japan, Australia, New Zealand and Hong Kong.

== Style ==
Chen was proficient in both traditional Chinese ink and Western oil painting, and experimented with a variety of styles ranging from Fauvism to Cubism. In Chen's exhibition held in May 1956, Sullivan noted his fascination for man-made things and clutter. The artist loved to experiment with the interplay of light and forms in chaotic subjects, like a junkyard. His unique style which showed interest in angles but not Cubist; strays not far from reality and is obsessed with shapes, and yet not an abstract painter. Chen also did not take to modern western art philosophies of that by western counterparts of his time like Picasso and Salvador Dalí.

Chen was also interested in human figures. He also did not see that humans are complex with distortions and conflicts, but merely a pattern of images, yet not like a pieced jigsaw puzzle. His interest was especially in local Indian people, particularly blue-collared workers and dairymen working in cattle yards; the geometric forms of Indian women dancers was an ideal subject of study for the artist.

Chen's mastery in depicting human figures was also found in keen observation of nature and animals. His subjects include landscapes, figures, birds and animals, still life studies and abstract compositions. Chen was especially adept at drawing egrets and monkeys. Among all the animal paintings by him, Chen's gibbon paintings stand out, as they were noted by Chen's attention to detail and sensitive rendering of the beautiful creatures. His first inspiration from painting gibbons came from a reproduction of a gibbon painting that formed the right triptych of the famous painting, White Robed Guanyin, Crane and Gibbon by the 13th-century Southern Song dynasty artist Muqi.

Awed by its lifelike quality, he was convinced with Muqi's great skill in close observation of the gibbons. So day and night, Chen studied Muqi's print and emulated the painting. Chen had never seen a gibbon when he was in China, and as a result he did not realise that gibbons, unlike monkeys, lacked tails.

It was only much later in the late-1940s, that a foreigner pointed out his error in his painting, and corrected him. Around that time, he had bought a white faced gibbon for $300 at a local pet shop shortly after he arrived in Singapore. This gave him immense opportunities to study the creature's postures and its characteristics, by rearing it in his home garden. In time, Chen had a total of six pet gibbons – one white, one grey and four black ones.

== Special Friendship with Dr. Earl Lu ==
The friendship between Chen Wen Hsi and Earl Lu (1925–2005) was a unique intersection of medicine, mentorship, and creative patronage that significantly shaped Singapore's art history.

What began in the mid-1950s as a formal student–teacher relationship, with Lu studying ink and brush painting under Chen, blossomed into a lifelong bond founded on mutual respect. As a surgeon and diplomat, Lu became more than just a pupil; he was a steadfast champion of Chen's ink works, purchasing the artist's paintings in the early years and promoting them to affluent peers. Lu also implemented strategic decisions that helped Chen build a broader collector base. Initially, Lu focused on acquiring smaller pieces, believing that larger, more significant works should be left to other collectors. Furthermore, as Chen’s works gained widespread popularity, Lu ceased purchasing new pieces to allow emerging collectors the opportunity to acquire Chen’s art. Despite stepping back from the market, Lu retained an important collection of Chen’s paintings from the 1980s. According to Low Sze Wee, Group Director (Museums), National Heritage Board, Singapore, this collection serves as a testament to their close friendship: "By the 1980s, the two men had become so close that Chen would present a favourite painting to Lu as a Chinese New Year gift annually".

Believing himself to be merely a custodian of art, Lu later donated many of the works he had acquired to public institutions. The most famous donated work is Two Gibbons Amidst Vines, which was featured on the reverse side of Singapore’s $50 note.

== Honours ==
For his contributions to the fine arts in Singapore, President Yusof Ishak conferred Chen the Public Service Star in 1964.

Chen's artistic endeavours have also made history by being the first artist with a number of first honours conferred on him. In 1975, Chen was conferred an honorary degree of Doctor of Letters by the then-Chancellor of the University of Singapore, and President of Singapore, Benjamin Sheares. In 1980, he became the first Singaporean artist to be invited, and conferred with the Golden Chapter gold medal award, by the National Museum of History in Taiwan. He was also the first recipient of the ASEAN Cultural and Communications Award for outstanding artists, in 1987.

After his death in 1991 at age 85, Chen was awarded a posthumous Meritorious Service Medal.

== See also ==
- Chen Chong Swee
- Cheong Soo Pieng
- Georgette Chen
- Lim Hak Tai
- Liu Kang
