= Georgette Chen =

Singaporean painter (1906–1993)

- 张荔英
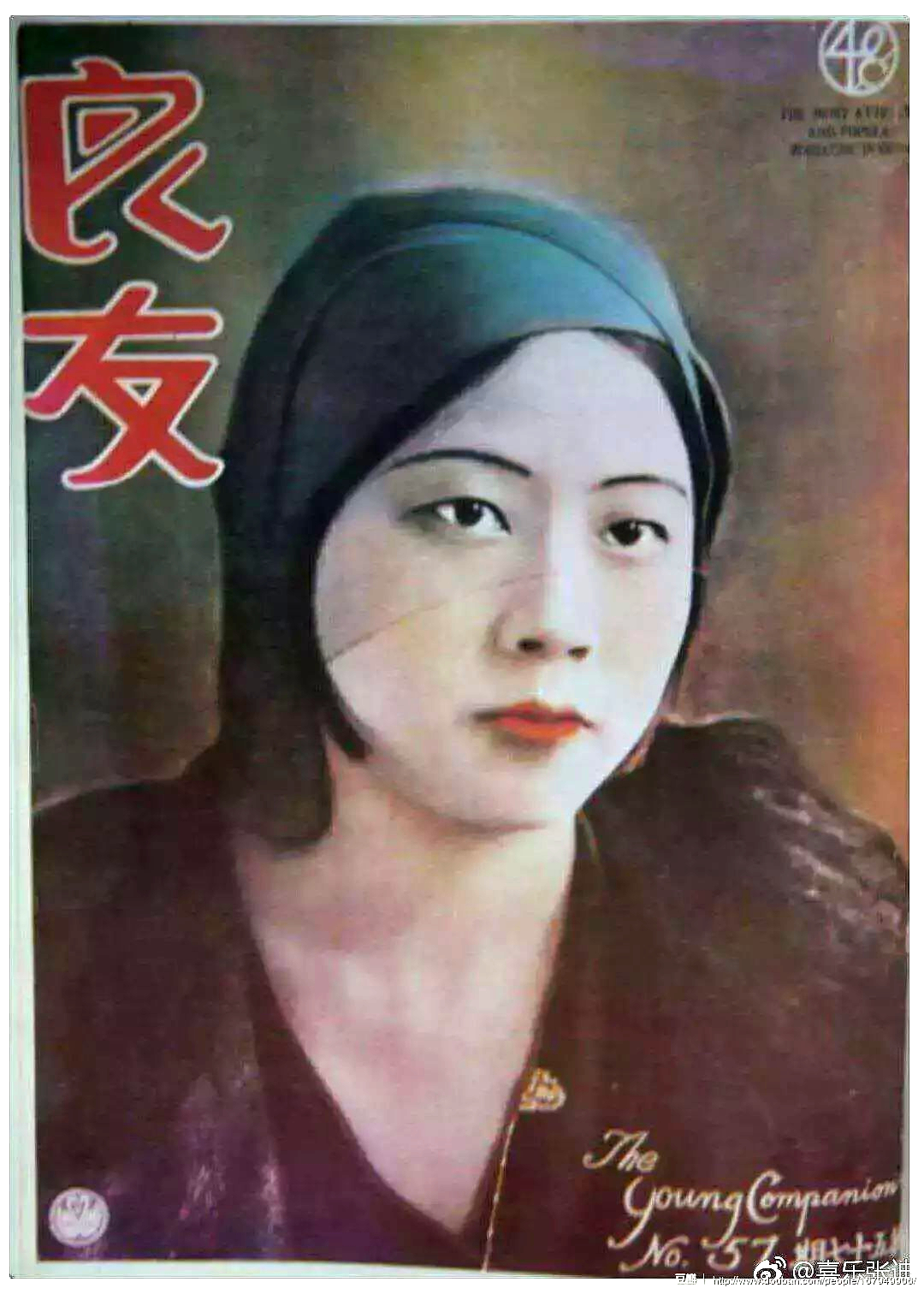
- Chen on the cover of The Young Companion, 1931
- Born: Chang Li Ying; 23 October 1906; Chekiang (Zhejiang), Qing Dynasty
- Died: 15 March 1993 (aged 86); Singapore
- Resting place: Mandai Crematorium
- Education: Académie Colarossi; Académie Biloul; Art Students League of New York
- Known for: Oil painting
- Movement: School of Paris; Nanyang Style; Impressionism; Post-Impressionism; Fauvism
- Spouse: Eugene Chen (m. 1930; died 1944)
- Awards: 1982: Cultural Medallion (Visual arts)

Chinese name
- Simplified Chinese: 张荔英
Transcriptions
Standard Mandarin
- Hanyu Pinyin: Zhāng Lìyīng

Georgette Liying Chendana Chen (Note: simplified Chinese: 张荔英; traditional Chinese: 張荔英; pinyin: Zhāng Lìyīng) (born Chang Li Ying; 23 October 1906 – 15 March 1993), commonly known as Georgette Chen, was a Singaporean painter of the School of Paris and one of the pioneers of modern Singaporean art as well as of the Nanyang style of art in the region.

A key figure in the development of modern art in Singapore, Chen is known for her oil paintings and contributions to art education as a teacher at the Nanyang Academy of Fine Arts (NAFA) from 1954 to 1981. Prior to being based in Malaya and Singapore from the 1950s onwards, Chen often travelled between cities such as Shanghai, Paris, New York and Tokyo, which led to her fluency in English, French and many other languages. In 1982, Chen was awarded the Cultural Medallion for her contributions to the visual arts in Singapore.

On 15 March 1993, Chen died of complications from rheumatoid arthritis after an 11-year struggle with the ailment.

== Early life and education ==
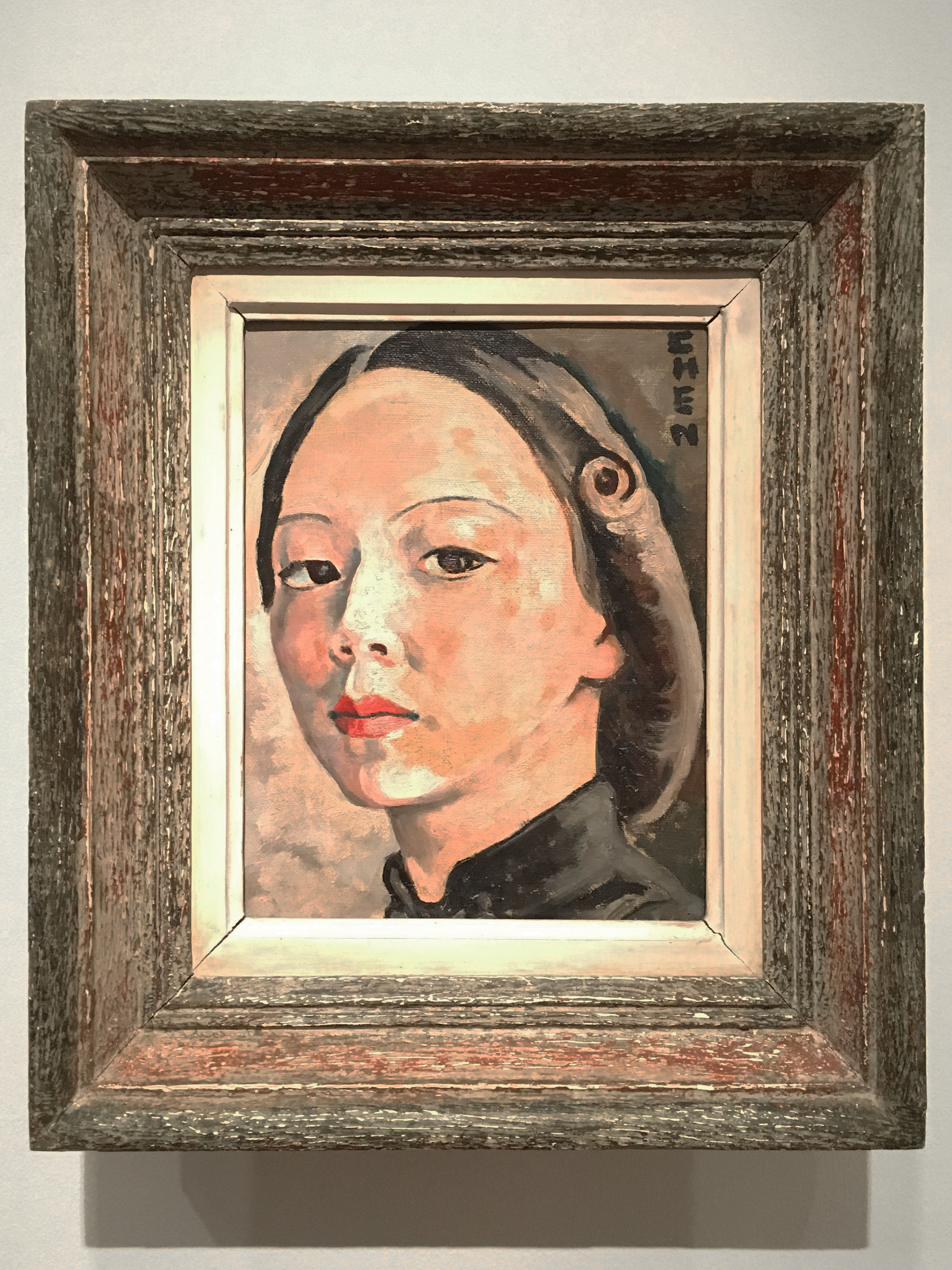
Georgette Chen, Self Portrait, c. 1946, Oil on canvas, Collection of National Gallery Singapore

Chen was born on 23 October 1906, the fourth of 12 children in Chekiang, Qing Dynasty (present-day Zhejiang, China). Her father Zhang Renjie (Chang Sen Chek) (born Zhang Jingjiang) was an antique dealer with businesses in Paris, London, and New York City. Due to her father's profession, Chen spent her childhood travelling between Paris and China with her family and attending high school in the US. Though living in the West, the Chang couple was deeply rooted to their Chinese heritage. Chen's father met Sun Yat-sen, the founder of Kuomintang (Chinese Nationalist Party) and the first Provisional President of the Republic of China, while aboard the SS Tonkin steamship. Later, he became a key supporter that financially supported Sun's anti-Qing revolutionary cause. Chen's mother only allowed her children to speak in the Shanghainese dialect at home, while her father often brought the family along on his regular trips to China to support Sun's revolution, and to ensure that his children would not forget their own cultural identity.

=== Impressionist French period (1920s–1930s) ===
Born into a privileged life, Chen was exposed to art at a young age. For most of her time in Paris she would either be painting at home, visiting museums, or roaming around the city every day. Chen attended high school in the US, and studied art at the Art Students League of New York for a year in 1926. She felt that Parisian life suited her better, and in 1927 she returned home to study at the Académie Colarossi and Académie Biloul in Paris. Though her parents provided financial support for her art education, they never fully accepted her decision to become a full-time artist, believing that artists would struggle to succeed financially in their careers. In Paris she was considered part of the loose group of mainly immigrant artists dubbed the School of Paris.

== Career ==
=== Post-Impressionist and Fauvist China–Hong Kong Period (1930s–40s) ===
In 1930, two of Chen's works were selected for inclusion in the Salon d'Automne exhibition in Paris. Thereafter, her work was exhibited for the first time at Salon des Tuileries and the Salon des Independents. Additionally, one of her works was even acquired by the Musée du Jeu de Paume in Paris; which was an unusual accomplishment for an Asian artist. The same year, at 24-years old, she married Eugene Chen Youren, a political associate of both Sun and Zhang (Chen's father), relocating from Paris to Shanghai as his wife in 1931. Eugene was a Chinese diplomat who had served as the foreign minister of Sun Yat-sen's Kuomintang (southern government) in the 1920s. Chen was introduced to Eugene in 1927 by their mutual friend Madame Sun Yat-sen. He was a lover of music and the arts, supportive of Chen's work towards becoming a professional artist. She would be Eugene's second wife after the death of his first wife, Agatha Alphosin Ganteaume. In 1937 when the Sino-Japanese War broke out, the couple moved to Hong Kong, where Eugene was involved in anti-Japanese activities. In 1944, the couple would be arrested by the Japanese in a Hong Kong hotel, interned and placed under house arrest; later they were transferred to Shanghai. Eugene succumbed to illness in Shanghai in May 1944, widowing a 38-year old Chen. At the end of the war, she returned to France, to hold the exhibition on Chinese landscapes, only to find that the curator of the French Museum whom she had made plans with had died. Thus, the original plan for the exhibition was abandoned.

In 1947, after several years of travelling across Asia while living in Shanghai, she married Dr Ho Yung Chi, a political historian and former aide of Eugene in New York City, where Ho worked as a journalist. In 1949, Chen held a major solo exhibition at the Asia Institute in New York, presenting paintings of China's landscapes and portraits that she created after the war. That same year, the couple moved to Paris, where Chen participated in the Salon d'Automne in Paris for the last time.

=== Nanyang style in Malaya and Singapore (1950s onwards) ===
Georgette Chen, Sweet Rambutans, 1965, Oil on canvas

Georgette Chen, Tropical Fruits, 1969, Oil on canvas

In 1951, with Chen longing to return to Asia, the couple relocated to Penang, Malaya. Chen would work there as an art teacher at Han Chiang High School, making many trips to Singapore during this period to visit several of her artist friends based there. In 1953, Chen mounted a solo exhibition of 80 paintings from her artistic practice in Malaya, notably still life paintings of local fruits and landscapes of Penang and Ipoh, at the Chinese Chamber of Commerce in Singapore. During her time in Singapore for the exhibition, she would meet the Nanyang Academy of Fine Arts (NAFA) president Lim Hak Tai, who invited Chen to teach at the academy, though she would not take up the offer then. Chen also finalised her divorce from Ho that year in Singapore, where she settled permanently and would spend the most artistically significant years of her life.

Georgette Chen, Fruits of Singapore, 1975, Oil on canvas

From 1954 to 1980, Chen would contribute significantly to visual art education in Singapore, working as a part-time art teacher at NAFA, training students such as Dorothy Bordass. During this period, she devoted her time to teaching and painting. Already calling herself a Singaporean in 1955, she built a house in Siglap Plain. Chen became a naturalised Singaporean citizen in 1966. Chen was fond of Singapore as her new home, learning to speak the Malay language and adopting "Chendana" as a Malay name for herself. Her Malay artist friends had sought to find her a Malay name with the syllable "Chen" in it, and out of the many names suggested, she chose "Chendana", meaning sandalwood. In Chen's paintings from this period, she would paint tropical fruit like rambutan, landscapes depicting the Singapore River, also portraying Sikh guards and Buddhist monks, as she was drawn to the colours of their turbans and robes. Chen was awarded the Singapore Cultural Medallion in 1982 for her contributions to visual art in Singapore. However, since she was hospitalized due to her illness, her student Ng Eng Teng received the medallion on her behalf. 1982 marked the beginning of a long illness for Chen, while solo exhibitions of her work continued to be staged. In 1985, a solo exhibition was held at the National Museum Art Gallery in Singapore featuring 172 of her works, and another solo exhibition would be staged at the National Art Gallery in Kuala Lumpur, Malaysia a year later in 1986, which was attended by Tunku Abdul Rahman, the first prime minister of Malaysia.

Throughout the decades, Chen's subjects had regularly been drawn from her various countries of residence—emigrating to Southeast Asia allowed her to continue her practice of depicting local subjects through her Western art style. By interweaving Asian themes with her Western art training, Chen would come to be historicised as one of the pioneers of the Nanyang style together with Liu Kang, Chen Chong Swee, Chen Wen Hsi and Cheong Soo Pieng, a rare woman artist in a then male-dominated art community.

== Death and legacy ==
Chen died of complications from rheumatoid arthritis on March 15, 1993, at Mount Alvernia Hospital after an 11-year struggle with the ailment.

Lee Seng Gee, Chairman of the Lee Foundation was appointed as the executor of the Georgette Chen Estate. In April 1994, Chen's house on Siglap Plain was auctioned for S$2.8 million. The money raised from the auction was given to the Georgette Chen Arts Scholarship for art students managed by the National Arts Council. A collection of Chen's paintings were stowed away in two rooms of her home, and subsequently discovered by Lee. In June 1994, Lee donated the 53 newly discovered paintings to the Singapore Art Museum (SAM). This brought a total of 104 paintings by Chen to be found in the museum collection. Apart from donations from the sale proceeds of her house, sales from Chen's personal investments of stocks and shares were also used to fund a new building for the Singapore Council of Women's Organisations (SCWO), as well as for community welfare projects for the local Malay community, and to the Practice Theatre Ensemble (founded by Kuo Pao Kun) to support Chinese theatrical art in Singapore.

Chen is historicised as a significant figure in the development of modern art in Singapore, widely recognised for her achievements as an artist and contributions as an educator. Posthumous retrospectives of her work continue to be staged, such as the 1997 Georgette Chen, an exhibition of Chen's paintings and drawings at the Singapore Art Museum. From 27 November 2020 to 26 September 2021, the exhibit Georgette Chen: At Home in the World was held at the National Gallery Singapore.

== In popular culture ==
In 2007, playwright Ng Yi-Sheng's musical Georgette was staged by Musical Theatre Ltd. In 2014, National Gallery Singapore published Eisner-nominated comic artist Sonny Liew's graphic novel, Warm Nights Deathless Days: The Life of Georgette Chen. Commissioned by the National Gallery Singapore, Channel NewsAsia produced a three-part docudrama, The Worlds of Georgette Chen, starring actress Rui En as Chen. The English-language series that was also adapted into Chinese, aired on Channel NewsAsia, MediaCorp Channel 5 and MediaCorp Channel 8 in April 2015.

On 1 November 2021, Chen would be celebrated in a Singapore and Malaysia-specific Google Doodle coinciding with the 91st anniversary of her first exhibition at the Salon d’Automne in Paris.

== Solo exhibitions ==
- Pioneer Artists of Singapore - Georgette Chen Retrospective 1985 – held at National Museum Art Gallery from 10 to 24 November 1985.
- Georgette Chen, a retrospective exhibition at the Singapore Art Museum in 4 April–15 June 1997.
- Georgette Chen: At Home in the World – held at National Gallery Singapore from 27 November 2020 to 26 September 2021.

== Publications ==
- National Museum Art Gallery (1985), Pioneer Artists of Singapore: Georgette Chen Retrospective 1985, Singapore

== See also ==
- Singaporean art
- Nanyang Style
- School of Paris
- Chen Chong Swee
- Chen Wen Hsi
- Cheong Soo Pieng
- Liu Kang
- Lim Hak Tai
