= Cheong Soo Pieng =

Singaporean painter (1917–1983)

- 钟泗宾
- Born: 1917; Amoy, China
- Died: 1 July 1983 (aged 66); Singapore
- Education: Xiamen Academy of Fine Art
- Known for: Oil painting, Watercolour, Chinese Ink and wash painting
- Movement: Modernism, Nanyang art style
- Awards: 1962: Pingat Jasa Gemilang (Meritorious Service Medal) by the Government of Singapore

Cheong Soo Pieng (simplified Chinese: 钟泗宾; traditional Chinese: 鍾泗賓; pinyin: Zhōng Sì Bīn; Pe̍h-ōe-jī: Tsing Sì-pin) was a Singaporean artist who was a pioneer of the Nanyang art style, and a driving force to the development of Modernism in visual art in the early 20th-century Singapore. He was also known for his known Southeast Asian indigenous tribal people with elongated limbs and torso, almond-shaped faces and eyes in his paintings.

== Early life ==
Cheong was born the youngest of seven children in Amoy, China. His parents were neutral to his choice of education, when Cheong took to studying art at the Xiamen Academy of Fine Art in 1933. In 1936 Cheong graduated and attended Xinhua Academy of Fine Art in Shanghai for further studies, only to have his education cut short with the breakout of the Sino-Japanese War and the school destroyed by Japanese invaders in 1938. Cheong returned to his Alma mater to teach art, and pursued his painting passion in watercolours due to scarcity of oil paint materials. In 1942 Cheong held his first solo exhibition of watercolor works. In 1945 Cheong left Mainland China for Hong Kong and relocated to Singapore in late 1946 where he would be a lecturer at the Nanyang Academy of Fine Arts for the next 20 years.

In 1955 Cheong Soo Pieng, along with five other artists Chen Wen Hsi, Chen Chong Swee, Lim Hak Tai, Tay Wee Koh, and Suri bin Mohyani were invited to showcase their artworks in England, funded by fellow artist and arts patron Ho Kok Hoe. The exhibition was officially opened by the Duchess of Kent. In 1962, the Government of Singapore awarded Cheong Soo Pieng the Meritorious Service Medal. Cheong died on 1 July 1983 due to heart failure.

== Bibliography ==
- T.Y., S, Y.J. Seng (2019). Soo Pieng: Master of Composition: STPI. ISBN 978-981-14-0086-5
- M.C.F., Hsu (1999). A Brief History of Malayan Art. Singapore: Millennium Books.
- Soo Pieng, 1917–1983, Cheong. 钟泗滨 (Cheong Soo Pieng). Singapore: Straits Commercial Art Co.
- Soo Pieng, 1917–1983, Cheong (1994). 新加坡先驱画家怀旧展 : 刘抗、钟四宾、陈宗瑞、陈文希 (Reminiscence of Singapore's pioneer art masters: Liu Kang, Cheong Soo Pieng, Chen Chong Swee, Chen Wen Hsi). Singapore: The Singapore Mint. ISBN 981-00-5279-0.
- Soo Pieng, 1917-1983, Cheong (1991). Cheong Soo Pieng : 1917-1983. Singapore: National Museum of Singapore.
- Soo Pieng, 1917-1983, Cheong (1983). Soo Pieng. Singapore: Summer Times Publishing. ISBN 9971-83-856-7.

== See also ==
- Chen Wen Hsi
- Chen Chong Swee
- Georgette Chen
- Lim Hak Tai
- Liu Kang

== External links and further reading ==
- Biotech website
- "In Art Exhibit, Singapore Honors a Son of China" article by Sonia Kolesnikov-Jessop in The New York Times 6 October 2010
