= Liu Kang (artist) =

Singaporean artist (1911–2004)

Liu Kang BBM PJG
- 刘抗
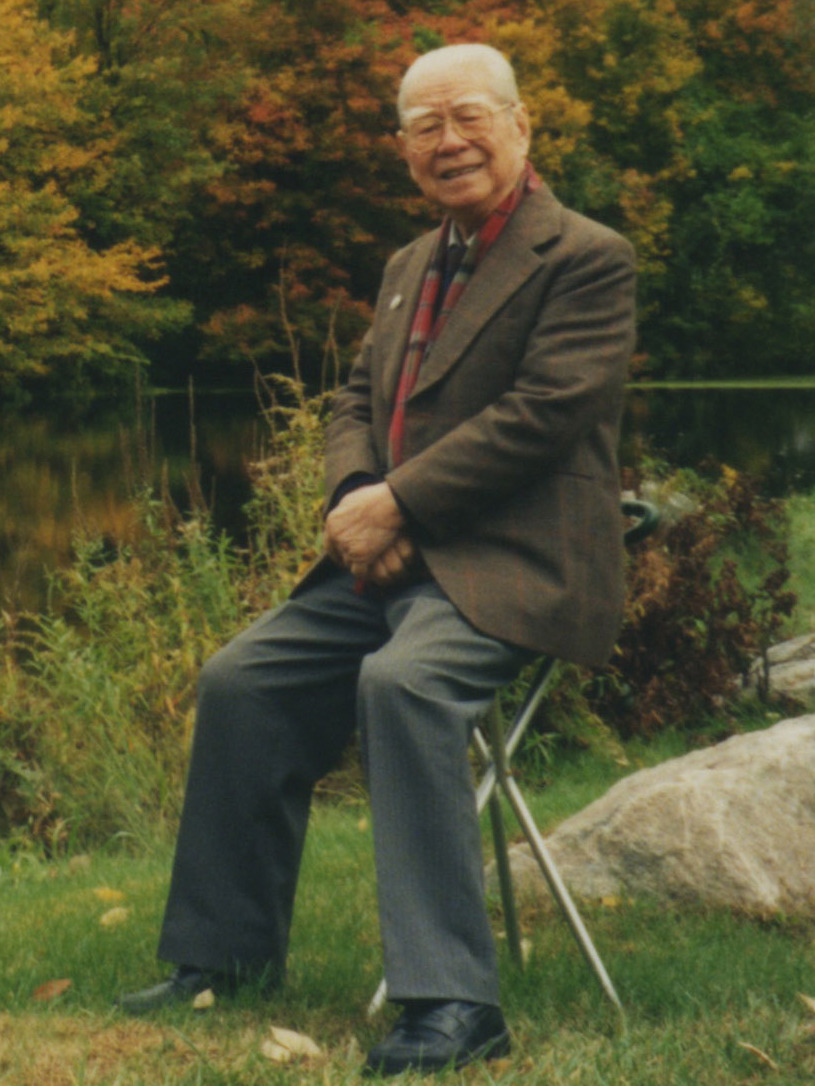
- Liu in the 1990s
- Born: Liu Kai; 1 April 1911; Yongchun County, Fujian, Qing dynasty
- Died: 1 June 2004 (aged 93); Mount Elizabeth Hospital, Singapore
- Known for: Oil painting
- Movement: School of Paris; Nanyang Style
- Spouse: Chen Jen Ping (m. 1937)
- Children: 5; including Thai Ker
- Awards: Bintang Bakti Masyarakat (1970); Pingat Jasa Gemilang (1996)

Liu Kang (Note: simplified Chinese: 刘抗; traditional Chinese: 劉抗; pinyin: Liú Kàng) BBM PJG (born Liu Kai; 1 April 1911 – 1 June 2004) was a Chinese-born Singaporean artist best known for his role in developing the Nanyang Style – an art style that blended Western and Eastern painting techniques – alongside artists Chen Chong Swee, Chen Wen Hsi, and Cheong Soo Pieng. Influenced by fauvism and post-impressionism, Liu was known for his paintings made in Bali.

Born in the Qing dynasty, Liu spent his early years travelling between British Malaya to China for his education, attending Jinan University and the Shanghai Academy of Arts. Inspired by an interest in Western art, Liu went to Paris to study at the L'École Nationale Superieure des Beaux-Arts from 1929 to 1933, where he was further influenced by Academy president and artist Liu Haisu and French painters. He returned to Shanghai in 1933 and began teaching at the Shanghai Academy of Arts on the invitation of Haisu. He stayed there until August 1937, when he decided to move to Muar, Malaysia, following the outbreak of the Second Sino-Japanese War, before later moving to Singapore in 1942.

In Singapore, he taught at different schools and was instrumental in developing the Nanyang Style during a 1952 artistic trip to Bali. In later years, Liu engaged with multiple Singaporean art groups. In 2003, a year before his death, he donated all his works to the Singapore Art Museum. He frequently depicted ordinary peoples' lives in his works and created many life drawings and nudes. Research studies on his paintings were conducted in later years.

== Early life and education ==
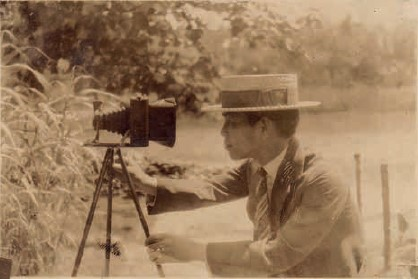
Liu in Shanghai in 1926

Liu Kai was born in Yongchun County, Fujian Province, in Qing China on 1 April 1911. He moved to British Malaya when he was five, and had his primary education at Chonghua Primary School in Muar, Malaysia, where his father worked as a rubber merchant. At some point in his youth, his name was changed from "Liu Kai" to "Liu Kang", likely suspected to be due to a mispronunciation by his Chonghua principal. Liu then had his secondary education in Singapore at The Chinese High School, but only studied there for one year before a strike led to the school's closure; as he originally lived at The Chinese High School, he later found housing at Haw Par Villa. Over time, as the strike showed little signs of letting up, students like Liu decided to attend the Jinan University in Shanghai, China, instead as they offered an affiliated school.

After completing a term at Jinan University, Liu decided to remain in China for two months, mainly due to the travelling costs and distance to head back to the Nanyang region. He then saw an advertisement for the Shanghai Academy of Arts and decided to attend as he had an interest in the arts. After the two months, Liu found he wanted to enrol in the Academy, and was made a second year student after passing the entrance examination. He typically painted in and studied both Western and Chinese styles at the Academy, along with developing a close relationship with Academy president Liu Haisu, who mentored him. Haisu was a strong supporter of Western art techniques, such as life drawing, which saw strong opposition from the Chinese community for going against traditional Chinese values in art.

After graduating, Liu then moved to Paris, France, in 1928 to further study Western art; during this time he lived with Haisu. He initially attended the Académie de la Grande Chaumière to study art, before attending the L'École Nationale Superieure des Beaux-Arts (present-day Beaux-Arts de Paris) from 1929 to 1933. During this period, he exhibited his works at the annual art exhibition Salon d'Automne. Liu's trip to France was inspired by his life drawing teacher Chen Hong, who frequently spoke about the development of art in France. During his time in Paris, under the influence of Haisu, Liu studied painters such as Paul Cézanne, Vincent van Gogh, Paul Gauguin, Edgar Degas, and Henri Matisse. He also held salon exhibitions to display his works and visited museums such as the Louvre frequently. Liu additionally met sculptor Paul Landowski and painter Kees van Dongen, being interested in post-impressionist and fauvist art styles. Haisu later left Paris in 1930 and Liu subsequently stayed at a boarding house with writer Fu Lei.

== Career ==
Liu returned to China after completing his studies in France in 1933, returning to the Shanghai Academy of Arts to teach Western art at its Western Arts Department; he worked there for five years. He was offered the job by Haisu, who was initially uncertain of Liu's teaching skills and named Liu's studio "Haisu, Liu Kang Studio" to boost its credibility. He further set up an exhibition of Liu's Paris works for students to see before Liu arrived. During his time at the Academy, Liu was known for his "energetic teaching style and passion for art", having used different teaching methods as compared to the Academy's traditional Chinese practices. He soon became "one of the most sought-after professors" at the Academy. In August 1937, due to the Second Sino-Japanese War, Liu and his family moved to Muar, Malaysia, where he settled for another five years. In Muar, he experimented with using chalk and pastels due to the lack of art materials there.

Liu later moved to Singapore in 1942 and began working at schools such as Chong Hwa High School, the Nan Chiao Teachers' Training College, Chung Cheng High School, Nanyang Girls' High School, and The Chinese High School, where he taught art. During the Japanese occupation however, he returned to Muar and stored 200 of his paintings at a school in Singapore, only to find they were all gone when he returned. In 1946, he produced 36 sketches for the book series Chop Suey, which detailed the conditions during the Japanese occupation from 1942 to 1945. Liu was involved in translating Chop Suey into Japanese for a 1991 reprint. From 1946 to 1958, he served as the chairman of the Society of Chinese Artists.

In 1952, Liu went on a trip to Bali with his fellow artist friends – Chen Chong Swee, Chen Wen Hsi, and Cheong Soo Pieng – in search of artistic influences based on the Balinese culture; this trip was inspired by the 1933 exhibition of Belgian painter Adrien-Jean Le Mayeur in Singapore. They travelled around Indonesia before staying at Bali for a month, where they met with Le Mayeur and his wife Ni Pollok. This trip saw the artists producing what is now known as the Nanyang Style, with Liu also creating some of his most well-known works. A subsequent 1953 exhibition in Singapore was held to showcase the over 100 works made by the four artists in Bali. Later in 1957, he held his first solo exhibition. From 1968 to 1979, Liu served as the president of the Singapore Art Society; he had helped found the society in 1949.

In 1970, Liu was awarded the Bintang Bakti Masyarakat (Public Service Star) by the Singaporean government for his contributions to the arts. Liu underwent an artistic trip to India in 1971 with the Ten Men Art Group, and went on two tours to China in 1974 and 1979. In 1981, the National Museum of Singapore held a retrospective exhibition of over 220 of Liu's works, as part of the Ministry of Culture's Singapore's Pioneering Artists series. More than 500 people attended the exhibition at its opening, including Minister of State for Culture Fong Sip Chee. In 1983, a travelling exhibition of his works was held, that went to Taipei, Kaohsiung, Taichung, and Tainan. In 1989, fifty of his works in oil and pastel were displayed at the National Museum in an exhibition titled Paintings by Liu Kang. In 1992, his eyesight in his left eye worsened significantly, but a 1993 cornea transplant helped him regain its functionality. Nevertheless, his health problems slowed down the speed of his work, stating in The Sunday Times that "A painting which needed only two to three days to do in the past now takes me about two to three weeks".

Liu held his fourth solo show at the National Museum in Singapore in 1993 with World of Liu Kang, which displayed paintings of China and Turkey. It was opened by National Arts Council chairman Tommy Koh. He was honoured by the government again in 1996 with the Pingat Jasa Gemilang (Meritorious Service Medal). In 1997, he showcased 60 oil and pastel works at the Singapore Art Museum at an exhibition called Liu Kang at 87. A subsequent exhibition called Liu Kang at 88 was held the following year at the Singapore Soka Association. In 2000, he held a solo exhibition in Beijing, China, which had been postponed since 1989 due to the Tiananmen Square protests. Liu had previously booked his venues with a planned route from Beijing to Shanghai, Nanjing, Fuzhou, and Hefei over a period of six months, however the Tiananmen Square protests halted his plans. In 2003, Liu donated the majority of his paintings and sketches, amounting to over 1,000 pieces, to the Singapore Art Museum. It was the largest donation of artworks made to the National Heritage Board at the time, with the collection valued at around S$18 million (US$10.33 million).

== Personal life and legacy ==
In 1937, Liu married Chen Jen Ping, sister of fellow artist Chen Jen Hao, and they had four sons and one daughter. They had met in 1926 when Liu accompanied the Chen family on a holiday. One of his sons, Liu Thai Ker, was an architect, urban planner, and former National Arts Council chairman; he died in 2026. Liu died on 1 June 2004 at Mount Elizabeth Hospital due to natural causes, having been hospitalised since 15 May. He was the last surviving Nanyang artist of the Bali trip.

In commemoration of Liu's 100th birth year, the National Gallery Singapore, Global Chinese Arts & Culture Society, and Lianhe Zaobao held a forum called "Liu Kang: Tropical Vanguard" on 2 April 2011. It saw a panel of established artists and scholars, gathered to discuss Liu's influence and contributions to Singapore's art history. In 2023, Liu's Pounding Rice (1953) sold for S$699,000 (US$520,000), the highest one of his works has ever sold at auction. In 2025, his works were featured in an art exhibition at the National Gallery Singapore that commemorated Asian artists of the School of Paris.

== Style and influences ==
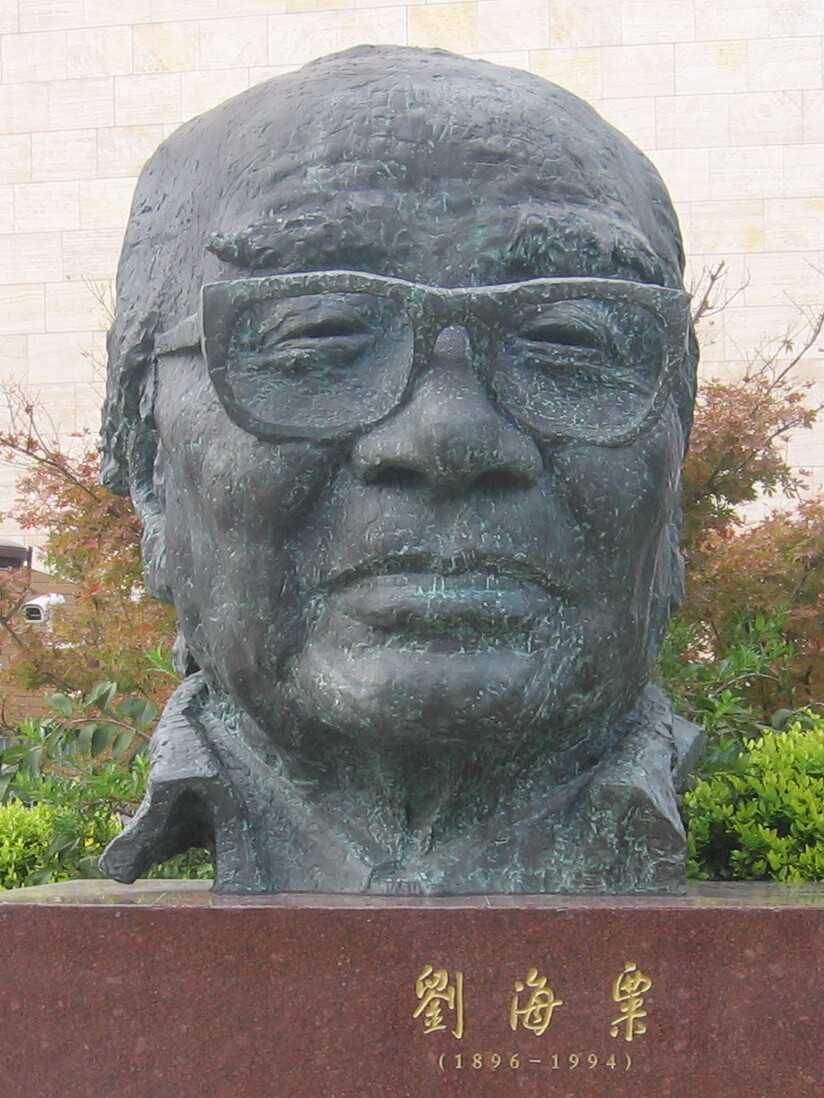
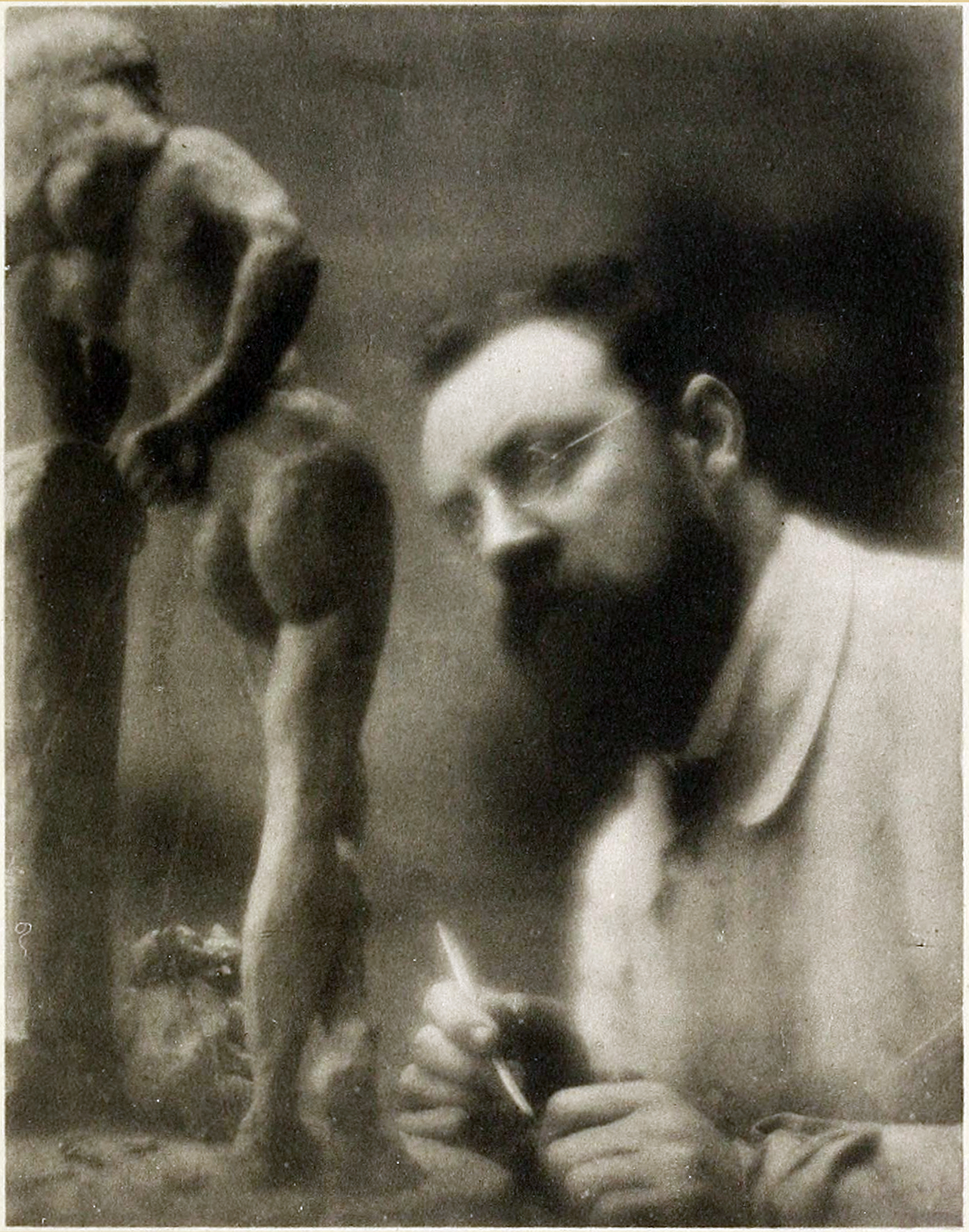
Among Liu's influences include his mentor Liu Haisu and the artist Henri Matisse's works.

In his early years making art, Liu focused on portraying the landscapes of places he visited, such as China and Europe. In his later career when he settled in Singapore, he shifted to creating artworks showcasing the average lives of people. According to Ong Zhen Min, Susie Wong, Patricia Ong, and Grace Tng, his portraiture "form[ed] the backbone of his work"; they stated that Liu utilised different techniques depending on the subject, with his friends appearing "soft and natural" whilst portrayals of people in ethnic clothing or dancers were "overly contrived". For example, his oil painting portraits Malay Man (1942) and Portrait of a Man with a Cap (1949) feature impressionist and realistic styles, respectively. In later years, his art became more stylised, as seen in In Conversation (1999), which also experiments with a pointillist style.

The writer Sonia Kolesnikov-Jessop opined that French artist Henri Matisse "left a powerful and lasting imprint" on Liu, especially in relation to the styles of Fauvism and post-impressionism. The artist Xu Beihong once remarked, on seeing Liu's paintings at a 1940 exhibition, that "You are truly the teacher of Matisse". (Note: Original: "你才是马諦斯的老师") Along with Matisse, Liu drew inspiration from artists like Pablo Picasso, Paul Cézanne, Vincent van Gogh, and Paul Gauguin; the art critic Chia Wai Hon described his modernist view to have been influenced by such artists along with Chinese art.

=== Works and themes ===
Although Liu's work was influenced by "grand and heroic compositions", he did not focus on dramatic historical events. Instead, he drew inspiration from everyday life and portrayed people in their day-to-day activities in his paintings, through both subject matter and setting. In his still lifes, he replaced traditional motifs with local equivalents, such as tropical orchids, crabs, and fruits. He also depicted communal and social scenes. Liu also had an interest in life drawing, which began in his youth as a student and continued into his nineties, and he considered life drawing as a "fundamental foundation of art practice." Most of Liu's portraits, drawings, and sketches were based on what he observed, including family, friends, and occasionally strangers. Ethnic identity later became a notable theme in his work, reflected in titles such as Chinese Muslim Facing Front and Indian Policeman. These works are less psychologically focused but explored racial and occupational identities.

Liu frequently painted Singaporean landmarks, such as the Stamford Raffles statue (Black Statue, 1940) and the Tan Kim Seng Fountain (Near Elizabeth Walk, 1979). He also portrayed urban occupations, though he did not focus on social inequality. His preference towards local subjects and ordinary scenes displayed his interest towards depicting "Singapore's distinctive economic and cultural life", according to Ong, Wong, Ong, and Tng. He also created sketches of nudes frequently – in both pastels and oils – and typically depicted women, focusing on their beauty. According to Kolesnikov-Jessop, Liu excelled at depicted light on skin using pastels and included thick outlines. In oil, his drawings of the human body became more expressive and less realistic. As Liu got older, Kolesnikov-Jessop states that, possibly due to his worsening eyesight, his nudes became more stylised and simple while his colours were expressionistic.

=== Nanyang Style ===
Artist and Model (1954) by Liu depicts the artist Chen Wen Hsi sketching a Balinese woman, and is done in the Nanyang Style.

Liu's works made before World War II, prior to the development of the Nanyang Style, displayed a link between Asian and Western art. For example, in Nude (1936), his use of colour shows influence from post-impressionism, while the thick black outline around the model is reminiscent of Chinese ink painting. These traits would become a trademark of his works in the Nanyang Style. Among other Nanyang artists, Liu's works are considered more fauvism and post-impressionism influenced. He was also the only of the Bali trip artists to create works mainly through oil painting. The Nanyang Style was described by the librarian Alicia Yeo as an "[articulation of] a Southeast Asian viewpoint through the integration of Chinese and Western elements", with Liu largely credited in its development.

A 2022 research study considered Liu's art style in the 1950s to have developed in conjunction with the development of the Nanyang Style. Paintings made from 1950 to 1953 feature broad areas of flat colours, limited shading, and minimal details. For example, Village (1950) and Government Office in Johore Bahru (1953) implement blocks of colours and strong outlines reminiscent of post-impressionism and Chinese calligraphy, respectively. Some works feature the white ground layer intentionally exposed for visual effects. However, two paintings from 1953, Scene in Bali and Offerings, differ in style from other works of this period, appearing more detailed and descriptive. This could have been due to Liu's interest in the Balinese culture and subject matter. Overall, Liu considered Bali as a place characterised by scenic landscapes, notable architecture, and local cultural life.

Outdoor Painting and Painting Kampong (both 1954) show innovation in his style from his 1950 to 1953 works, appearing more flat and simplified through solid colours and minimal texture from the paint. These works also feature dark outlines and exposed white ground, possibly taking influence from dye-resistance techniques done with batik textiles. Attempting the texture of batik in his paintings was influenced from his artist friend Chuah Thean Teng. For example, in Artist and Model (1954), the sarong of the model is detailed to keep its batik appearance. As Liu's Boats (1956) and Char Siew Seller (1958) were done over earlier compositions, they used a wet-on-wet and wet-on-dry technique to simulate exposed white ground, which affected the clean division between blocks of colour. Therefore, these paintings lack the detail and precision as compared to other 1950s paintings by him. Liu mainly painted with brushes, but occasionally used a palette knife for larger areas, creating impastos. In some works he also experimented with scraping wet paint to create additional visual detail.

== Technical analysis and materials ==
=== Paris works (1929–1932) ===
A 2021 technical analysis of thirteen of Liu's works from his time in Paris was conducted by researchers Damian Lizun, Teresa Kurkiewicz, and Bogusław Szczupak using non-invasive methods. Although the exact brands of paint he used are unknown, evidence suggests that Liu possibly used paint from Lefranc & Bourgeois, Lechertier Barbe, Paris American Art, and S. C. & P. Harding. Liu's blue often appears purple, suggesting the use of ultramarine and/or cobalt blue. Small amounts of viridian were also detected, which together with the ultramarine, explains the purple appearance. An absence of Prussian blue was noted, possibly because its greenish tone and tendency to fade made it less suitable for depicting skies and water. The research showed that viridian was Liu's preferred green, although it often appeared mixed with pigments like emerald green, Prussian blue, chrome yellow, or cobalt blue. Cadmium yellow and lead white were frequently used in creating lighter green tones. Evidence suggests that Liu may have also used commercial chrome green – consisting of Prussian blue and chrome yellow – which was widely available at the time.

Analysis of Liu's use of yellow identified four different pigments, with chrome yellow being the most common, appearing as either a main component or combined with yellow iron oxide. Brown areas in his paintings were mainly created with brown and yellow iron oxides, with lighter tones including lead white or yellow containing chromium. Analysis of his red use produced three organic red pigments, used either as primary colours or mixed to adjust tone. In certain works, red areas were made up of red iron oxide with minor additions of other pigments. Liu tended to use lead white – often mixed with calcium carbonate – in most paintings, while in others he intentionally exposed the white ground layer, using it to depict foamy water. Zinc white, titanium white, and barium-based pigments were also detected in some areas, sometimes as commercial mixtures. Liu's blacks were almost always mixtures of black and different pigments, with some paintings featuring a more intense black colour made of carbon black combined with either Prussian blue, ultramarine, cobalt blue, or viridian.

Another 2021 study from Lizun, Kurkiewicz, and Szczupak found that Liu typically attached his canvases to strainers with a cross-member, although the specific manufacturer for either remains unknown. Contemporary price lists suggest that he may have purchased strainers instead of stretchers because they were cheaper. Liu was also known to have painted en plein air, as was advocated by impressionist, post-impressionist, and fauvist movements. He also used smaller paintings supports more frequently than larger supports, possibly due to easier transportation and cheaper costs. All the examined paintings were done on linen canvases in a plain weave, with two types of canvas identified: a thinner fabric used in most works and a denser fabric used less frequently. Evidence shows that Liu occasionally reused earlier canvases or painted on the reverse of previous works. Examination of works painted in Switzerland and Belgium revealed similar canvas and ground characteristics, suggesting that Liu may have brought painting materials with him when travelling.

=== Shanghai works (1933–1937) ===
A 2023 study of twelve of Liu's works during his time in Shanghai was conducted by researchers Lizun, Kurkiewicz, Szczupak, and Jarosław Rogóz. The brands of paint Liu used in Shanghai are unknown. Research showed that ultramarine was Liu's choice for blue – being used to depict skies and water – and often appeared mixed with Prussian blue, viridian, yellow ochre, or strontium yellow. He used viridian to depict green areas, though often combined with ultramarine, Prussian blue, and yellow chromate pigments. Liu also used emerald green, though in a limited capacity similar to its use in his Paris works, suggesting that he was uninterested in using it extensively. His yellow and brown tones were primarily created using yellow and red iron-rich earth pigments, yellow chromate pigments, and umber, with bone black occasionally used to darken brown shades. The white in Liu's paintings mainly consisted of barium white, zinc white, and lithopone. Black was used rarely – only in one sample – and was made from a mixture of Prussian blue, ultramarine, viridian, and bone black.

In a 2021 study from Lizun, Kurkiewicz, and Szczupak, a majority of his Shanghai works were painted en plain air and were likely stretched on unbranded strainers. He used canvases of typical sizes and sometimes reused canvases from earlier compositions. Liu used two types of canvas: a denser cotton canvas and a thinner linen canvas. He preferred using the cotton canvases (appearing in 19 paintings) likely due to their cheaper price. Most of his paintings included tacking margins and a white ground layer, suggesting they were prepared commercially. The research also indicated that he reused earlier canvases without adding an intermediate ground.

=== Nanyang Style works (1950–1958) ===
In 2022, a technical analysis of Liu's works and materials in the 1950s was conducted by researchers Lizun, Kurkiewicz, Mateusz Mądry, and Szczupak. They studied ten paintings of his, all of which were linen plain weave canvases with Z-twisted threads. Nine used bevelled strainers while one used a plywood board. Using technical examination, all the canvases were commercially prepared, with some reused and painted over from earlier compositions. Liu was known to sketch his ideas on paper, which displayed experimentation with styles such as cubism. Although it is unknown the brands of painting materials he used, a 1955 essay by Singaporean artist Ho Kok Hoe stated that "Viridian has become [Liu's] favourite colour, with vermilion and Prussian blue to harmonise with it".

Ultramarine was Liu's preferred blue pigment, often appearing alone or mixed with Prussian blue or viridian to create different shades. In a few cases, other blues such as manganese blue, cerulean blue, and cobalt blue were identified. He also experimented with phthalocyanine blue, but did not appear attracted to it. The research showed that viridian was Liu's preferred colour for green, and it often appeared mixed with ultramarine or Prussian blue. Minimal use of emerald green was found, which resembled his lack of interest towards the pigment in his Paris works. Liu created warmer green tones in his work by mixing it with cadmium yellow or its variants. Analysis of yellow areas found that cadmium yellow was the most common pigment, with chrome yellow, zinc yellow, yellow iron oxide, and cobalt yellow appearing less frequently. In comparison to his Paris works, chrome yellow's use decreased in favour of cadmium yellow.

Brown tones were typically created by mixing yellow and red iron oxides, with darker browns produced by adding pigments such as bone black or umber. Liu frequently used organic red pigments for red areas, often mixing them with yellow iron oxide, chrome yellow, or cadmium yellow to create different shades. Darker shades used bone black or ultramarine. Several organic reds and cadmium red were identified, but vermilion – described as an important pigment in his work – was not detected in any of his works. Analysing his use of white, Liu did not rely on a single white pigment, instead using a variety of whites such as lead white, zinc white, and barium-based whites. Black paint appeared occasionally and was mainly produced using bone black. It also appeared mixed with other colours.

=== Huangshan and Guilin works (1977–1996) ===
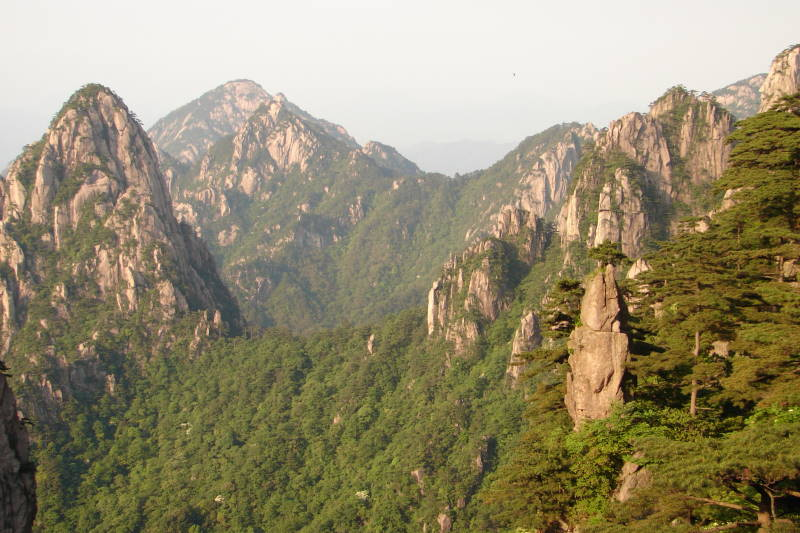
His paintings of the mountains of Huangshan (pictured) feature heavy impastos that depict the mountain's rocky texture and vegetation.

A 2022 study of eleven of Liu's Huangshan and Guilin landscapes was conducted by researchers Lizun, Kurkiewicz, Szczupak, and Rogóz. Four of the paintings were made on unbranded textiles, while the rest made up three types of canvas. The first type is a high density plain-woven cotton canvas with S-twisted warp and Z-twisted weft threads, the second type is a basket-woven linen canvas with Z-twisted threads, and the third type is a plain-woven linen canvas also with Z-twisted threads. Some were commercially stretched, while others were stretched by Liu himself. He often used 4 millimetres (0.16 in) Masonite hardboards, which were better suited to support his technique of heavy impasto and scraping, though it is not known if he bought these in Singapore or China.

Microscopic analysis and archival photographs show that seven of these paintings were made without a ground layer; Liu painted directly onto the hardboard, sometimes over an earlier work, without applying a preparatory layer. Ground layers were only identified in four paintings. Although information on the brands of paint he used during this period is unknown, in a 1982 television documentary, it can be seen in his studio oil paint tubes from Royal Talens, Rowney, and Winsor & Newton; the latter appeared to date before 1957, indicating Liu may have used older stock. He was also known to have used Royal Talens's Rembrandt series and Rowney's Georgian series of oil paints in works from the 1990s. The researchers suggested that works from this period were painted with similar brands and that he may have mixed paints from several brands.

Liu's brown, yellow, and orange areas were mainly created using yellow and red iron-containing earth pigments, sometimes mixed with bone black or umber. Liu primarily used ultramarine for his blue areas, and it appeared mixed with cobalt blue and Prussian blue to create different shades. In green areas, his preferred green was viridian, though it often appeared combined with other pigments. Other greens such as phthalocyanine green were identified. Analysis showed that titanium white was commonly used for white areas such as clouds or mixed in with other pigments. Besides titanium white, analysis also found lithopone white, barium white, and zinc white. Liu did not use any black brushstrokes in the studied paintings. He was also known to make preparatory sketches.
