= Goh Beng Kwan =

Artist based in Singapore

Goh Beng Kwan 吴珉权
- Born: 1937 (age 88–89); Medan, Sumatra, Indonesia
- Education: Art Students League of New York (1961–65)
- Known for: Collages, Abstract art, Oil painting
- Movement: Modern art, Abstract Expressionism

Goh Beng Kwan (Chinese: 吴珉权; pinyin: Wú Mínquán; born 1937, in Medan, Indonesia) is a pioneering Singaporean modern artist, known for his abstract collages that incorporate materials such as fabric, nails, and paper, exploring issues around cultural representation, urbanism, and identity.

He is one of the first post-war artists in Singapore to travel to the United States for an art education at the Art Students League of New York. In 1982, Goh received the first prize at the inaugural UOB Painting of the Year Competition. He awarded the Cultural Medallion in 1989 for his contributions to the visual art of Singapore.

== Personal life and education ==
Goh was born in 1937 in Medan, Sumatra, Indonesia to a Chinese immigrant father and Peranakan mother, the fourth in a family of six children. Goh moved to Singapore with his parents at the age of eight after the end of World War II. In Singapore, Goh attended the Chinese High School and studied art under Singapore pioneer artist Chen Wen Hsi. Chen would teach Goh art lessons from his home after school, bringing him on art excursions with fellow Singapore pioneer artist Cheong Soo Pieng. Studying under these two Nanyang style artists for almost 10 years since 1952, Goh developed a strong foundation in the Western style of representational painting with an appreciation for Chinese ink painting and calligraphy.

In 1961, Goh would exhibit his work for the first time at the Five Man Exhibition at the National Museum Art Gallery in Singapore. After this, he moved to the US to further his studies at the Art Students League of New York, studying oil painting under acclaimed painter Sidney Gross. Goh would leave representational painting behind for Abstract Expressionism, then flourishing in New York City's art scene, further taking inspiration from figures such as Willem de Kooning and Robert Rauschenberg. Goh would work part-time in a Chinese restaurant to help finance his studies, continuing to do so even after receiving the Allen Tucker Scholarship in the second year of his studies and the Ford Foundation Scholarship in his third.

During this period in 1964, Goh also attended the two-month long Provincetown Workshop in Massachusetts, where he was mentored by abstract painter and collagist Leo Manso and modernist painter Victor Candell. Here, Goh made his first attempts at collage painting using salvaged materials, further incorporating the influences of Chinese calligraphic strokes in his abstract painting-collages. A year later in 1965, Goh attended his second Provincetown Workshop.

== Career ==
After his second Provincetown Workshop, Goh held his first solo exhibition at the Ruth Sherman Gallery in New York.

Goh returned to Singapore in 1966, holding a solo exhibition in Singapore at the National Library to acclaim. The works were praised for introducing fresh approaches to the Singapore art scene, with materials such as nails, tea wrapping, Chinese oracle papers, newspapers, and acupuncture diagrams incorporated into his collage-paintings. He began his association with the Alpha Gallery in the early 1970s, a space that brought together young Singaporean and Malaysian artists who had recently returned from overseas studies. Between the mid-1970s to the early 1980s, Goh would participate in group exhibitions and hold a solo exhibition at the Alpha Gallery. Goh became an influential artist in 70s Singapore, contributing significantly to the development of local contemporary art.

Goh’s work received affirmation through his abstract collage The Dune (1982), which won the inaugural United Overseas Bank (UOB) Painting of the Year award in 1982. Goh subsequently took on painting full-time, with formal representation by the Art Forum gallery. In 1989, Goh was awarded the Cultural Medallion for Visual Arts, the highest state accolade recognising contributions made to the development of art in Singapore.

In 1991, a solo exhibition by Goh entitled Journeys was held at the National Museum Art Gallery. The subsequent years would continue to see him participating in solo and group exhibitions, art festivals, and events in Singapore and abroad.

In 2021, Goh's works would be featured at the National Gallery Singapore exhibition, Something New Must Turn Up: Six Singaporean Artists After 1965, with a solo section titled Nervous City that focussed on Goh's practice. The exhibition would feature Goh's paintings, collages, and metal assemblages.

In celebration of his 85th year of life, Goh held a landmark solo exhibition showcasing 85 of his works at Conrad Centennial Singapore. This is a significant milestone as it is the artist’s first solo exhibition since 1991.

== Publications ==
- Goh Beng Kwan (2019), Cresting the Waves, ISBN 9811416001
