= Flatness (art) =

In art criticism of the 1960s and 1970s, flatness described the smoothness and absence of curvature or surface detail of a two-dimensional work of art.

== Views ==
Critic Clement Greenberg believed that flatness, or two-dimensionality, was an essential and desirable quality in painting, a criterion which implies rejection of painterliness and impasto. The valorization of flatness led to a number of art movements, including minimalism and post-painterly abstractionism.

Modernism in the arts appeared during the second half of the 19th century and extended into most of the 20th. This period of art is identified by art forms consisting of an image on a flat two-dimensional surface. This art evolution began in the 1860s and culminated 50 years later. By this time almost all three-dimensional works had been eliminated. This new approach to painting was to create a visual appearance of realism. Looking at a surface with only two dimensions our perception of depth is an illusion. The reduction of depth in painting was the consequence of investigation. This new essence of self-analysis attempted to establish an experience or effect from the viewer of the painting.

== Terminology and history ==
The term flatness can be used to describe much of the popular American art work of the 1950s and 1960s. The art of this period had a basic yet colorful design that held a degree of two dimensional form. Thus the term flatness is used to describe this medium. The groundwork idea for Minimalism began in Russia in 1913 when Kazimir Malevich placed a black square on a white background claiming that:

Art no longer cares to serve the state and religion it no longer wishes to illustrate the history of manners, it wants to have nothing further to do with the object as such, and believes that it can exist in and for itself without things.

One of the first Minimalism artworks was created in 1964 by Dan Flavin. He produced a neon sculpture titled Monument for V. Tatlin. This work was a simplistic assembly of neon tubes that were not carved or constructed in any way. The idea was that they were not supposed to symbolize anything but to just merely exist. The Minimalist approach to art was to conceive by the mind before execution. Traditional modes of art composition were rejected in favor of improvisation, spontaneity and automatism. This new expressionist style consisted of improvised pattern making where every stroke of the brush was viewed as expression and subjective freedom.

== Pop Art ==
This concept inspired a whole new art form called Pop Art. It retained the color scheme and simplicity of Minimalism, but it borrowed images from pop culture to become relatable. The works now in question held a meaning for the viewer with familiar imagery but it still retained the avant-garde approach of Minimalism. Pop Art is a well-recognized movement in 1960s culture. This type of art was very free-form fashionable and rebellious. It was wild and colorful but many works retained the idea of two dimensional flatness.

== Op Art ==
Pop Art fell out of fashion and a new movement came into being. Op Art or Optic Art was now the latest trend in home décor and fashion. This form of modern art shares a strong relationship with the culture thought and design of the 1960s. This new art form focused on non-objective painting that focused on design, color, form, and line. These paintings were hand-drawn or created with a mechanical aid. They featured a flat-looking two dimensional design that could appear to pop out in an almost three dimensional form. Some pieces look as if they are moving due to shape and line placement creating a trick of the eye. This form of art was created to test the limits of the conscious perception of the viewer.

Bright colors were no longer favored, as much of Op Art is black and white with little use of color. The designs presented migrated back to the Minimalist idea of art simply existing and not representing an ideal. A well noted artist of this style is Bridget Riley who shaped the contemporary art scene of the early 50s and 70s. Her works are designed to pull the eye in such a way to stretch and disorder the perceptual sense. She is considered a ground-breaking artist in the realm of modern art. Her work mainly consists of detailed line and circle patterns to create an optical challenge for the viewer.

Riley composes her art with the thought in mind that we all have a narrow view on how we see things and our vision is rarely stretched to new abilities. Her work confronts the observer with new imaginative sensations, and the overall purpose of the artist's disappears and is replaced with what the viewer conceives. This form of art has no clear outlined theme therefore it allows total freedom for one to compose their imagination. Riley's work ignores object and instead focuses on visual movement to create a seemingly endless pattern. Riley's art appeared in the fashion of that era. Similar patterns still remain popular in clothing today.
