= Sidney Gross =

Urban surrealist painter

Sidney Gross (died in 1969, at the age of 48) was an American artist and painter. His early style was influenced by the Social realism. He also drew on the Surrealist Movement that was just beginning the year he was born. By the time he was twenty, he was painting distinctively urban surrealism, while producing critically admired portraits, something he continued to do during his lifetime.

== Career ==
Late in the 1940s and early into the 1950s, he experimented with various forms of abstract expressionism, including what one critic called amorphorism. These soft, diffuse, often numbered abstractions bore the title ‘Dusky’.

He continued to produce realistic portraits and semi-abstract portraits of the landscape of New York City. By the mid 1950s, he was producing large and dynamic works of Abstract Expressionism and finding a cliental at a time when other Abstract Expressionist artists were forced to band together to exhibit. Around 1960, his UFO and Probe Series began to include controlled abstractions against hard edge geometric fields of colors. In 1968, he had a joint exhibit with Mario Cooper at Lehigh University Art Gallery organized by Francis Quirk. At that time Lehigh purchased one of his UFO paintings. At his premature death, he was setting expressionistic forms in a wide bands of colors, separated by a white field.

Throughout his relatively short career, he received critical acclaim and financial success.

Sidney Gross is listed in Who Is Who in the East, Who Is Who in America annually 1957 to 1967, Who Is Who in American Art 1948 to 1969, and in Who Was Who in American Art. Essays about his work appear in Master Paintings from the Butler Museum, Catalog of the Whitney Collection, and in Permanent Collection of the Wichita Art Museum, Jewish Artists by Jon Catagno, American Paintings of Today, MOMA, as well as in exhibition catalogs of various museums and his one-man shows, more recently in a monograph for an exhibit in the 1990s, and the 2007 monograph Sidney Gross - A Vision Cut Short, Leonard Davenport and the ongoing biography project on the web at https://web.archive.org/web/20150925133242/http://www.lsdart.com/assets/Artist/grossbook.pdf. Reviews and illustrations appeared in Art News, Art Digest, Arts Magazine, American Art, and most of the then almost a dozen New York area newspapers.

== Solo Shows ==
- Contemporary Art Gallery, - NYC 1945-1959
- Tirca Karlis Gallery, Provincetown - 1960, 1962
- Frank Rehn Gallery, NYC - 1949, 1950, 1951, 1953, 1954, 1956, 1958, 1959, 1960, 1961, 1963, 1965, 1967, 1969, memorial 1972
- Pinchpenny Gallery - Essex Ct 1959,1985?
- Seasons Gallery, The Hague, The Netherlands - 1977
- David David Gallery, Philadelphia 1991
- Kaleidodscope Gallery, Sagamore, MA 1992
- Gertrude Stein Gallery - 2000
- Davenport & Fleming Gallery - 2007
- Memorial exhibits in New York City, Baltimore, and Providence, RI.

== Permanent Collections ==
- Albright-Knox Art Gallery
- Allentown Museum of Art - 1967
- American Academy of Arts & Letters - Childe Hassam Fund - 2 paintings
- Art Students League of NY
- Baltimore Museum of Art - 1961, 1962
- Block Museum (Northwestern) - 1996
- Brandeis University -1956
- Butler Institute of American Art - 1953, 1961, 2004
- Walter P. Chrysler Museum - 1960
- Colby College - 1958
- Columbia University - 1962
- Cornell University - 1958
- Corcoran Gallery of Art - 1961
- Israel Museum of Art - Jerusalem - 1965
- Guus Maris Collection
- James Michner Collection - University of Texas - 1967
- Lempert Institute - 20 paintings purchased 1948-52
- Lehigh University Art Gallery -1 painting purchased "UFO No. 27" 1968
- Morgan State College - 1961 - reproduction available
- Muscarelle Museum of Art (College of William & Mary)
- New York University
- Norfolk Museum of Art
- Oklahoma Art Center - 1968
- Philbrook Art Center - 1966
- Provincetown Art Museum -1969, 1985, 1989
- Princeton Museum - before 1953
- Mt. Holyhoke University - 1950
- Michigan State University - 1960,1966
- Norfolk Museum 1963
- Riverside Museum - 1959, 1963, 1966
- Standard Financial Corporation 1958, 1959, 1960
- Smithsonian American Art Museum (3) 1975
- Syracuse University - 1963, 1965
- Washington Gallery of Modern Art - 1962
- Whitney Museum - 1945, 1946, 1955
- Walker Art Center 1948?
- Wichita Art Museum - 1987
- University of Georgia - 1949
- University of Illinois - 1949
- University of Omaha - 1951
- University of Maryland 1965
- University of Rochester - 1966

Date indicates when entered in collection. Painting may no longer be in the collection or the institution may have since closed.

== Invitational Exhibits ==
- Pennsylvania Academy of Art - multiple exhibits beginning 1945 and when he was a student
- Carnegie Museum of Art - multiple exhibits beginning 1945
- Whitney Museum - multiple exhibits beginning 1945
- Armory Show - 1945
- Brooklyn Museum - 1945
- Pepsi Cola Traveling Exhibit - 1945, 1946
- Frank Rehn Gallery, NYC - 1946-1970s
- Corcoran Museum of Art - multiple exhibits, including biennials 1953-63
- Jewish Museum, NYC
- University of Nebraska
- National Academy of Design - 1946, 1948
- Toledo Museum of Art - 1947
- Audubon Artists - annually from 1947–67
- Milwaukee Art Institute - 1946, 1951
- Minneapolis Art Institute - 1946
- Federation of Modern Painters & Sculptors - annually from 1947–67
- Albright Art Gallery - 1947, 49, 1951
- Museum of Modern Art - 1949, 1959, 1961
- Hallmark Traveling Exhibit - 1949 Institute of Contemporary Art

Corcoran Gallery
Los Angeles County Museum
City Art Museum of St. Louis
W. R. Nelson Gallery, Kansas City
Des Moines Art Center
Detroit Institute of Arts
Isaac Delgado Museum, New Orleans
Carnegie Institute
Albright Art Gallery, Buffalo
Joslyn Art Museum, Omaha
Milwaukee Art Institute

- Wildenstein Gallery - 1949
- Virginia Museum of Fine Arts - 1949
- University of Illinois - 1949
- Metropolitan Museum of Art - 1950
- Hallmark - National Tour - 1950-51
- American Academy of Arts & Letters - 1950, 1955, 1958
- Institute of Contemporary Art Boston - 1951
- Nelson Gallery - 1951
- Detroit Institute of Art - 1951
- Des Moines Art Center - 1951
- Isaac Delgado Museum - 1951
- Montclair Art Museum - 1951
- Hallmark - European tour - 1952
- Butler Institute of American Art - beginning 1953
- Joslyn Art Museum - 1954
- Brazil - Contemporary Arts - 1956
- Riverside Museum - multiple since 1957
- American Federation of Arts - 1958-60
- Zabriskie Gallery, NYC 1958
- Puerto Rico - 1959
- Art USA - 1958, 1959
- Washington Gallery of MA - 1962, 1966
- YMHA &YWHA of Elizabeth - 1963
- Poindexter Gallery - 1963
- National Institute of Arts & Letters - 1967
- Artists for SEDF - 1967
- Lehigh University Art Galleries - 1968
- Maryland Arts Council at the Peale Museum - 1968 (then travelled throughout the state)
- Baltimore Museum of Art Invitational - 1968
- Art Expo/New York - GIN gallery - 1980
- Hillstrom Museum of Art, MN - 2007
- L.I. Museum at Stony Brook - 2008
- Davenport & Fleming - 2010
- Gilbert Pavilion Gallery - 2011
- Davenport & Shapiro Fine Art - 2012-13
