= Visual art of Singapore =

The visual art of Singapore, or Singaporean art, refers to all forms of visual art in or associated with Singapore throughout its history and towards the present-day. The history of Singaporean art includes the indigenous artistic traditions of the Malay Archipelago and the diverse visual practices of itinerant artists and migrants from China, the Indian subcontinent, and Europe.

Singaporean art includes the sculptural, textile, and decorative art traditions of the Malay world; portraiture, landscapes, sculpture, printmaking, and natural history drawings from the country's British colonial period; along with Nanyang style paintings, social realist art, abstract art, and photography practices emerging in the post-war period. Today, it includes the contemporary art practices of post-independence Singapore, such as performance art, conceptual art, installation art, video art, sound art, and new media art.

The emergence of modern Singaporean art, or more specifically, "the emergence of self-aware artistic expression" is often tied to the rise of art associations, art schools, and exhibitions in the 20th century, though this has since been expanded to include earlier forms of visual representation, such as from Singapore's pre-colonial periods.

Presently, the contemporary art of Singapore also circulates internationally through art biennales and other major international exhibitions. Contemporary art in Singapore tends to examine themes of "hyper-modernity and the built environment; alienation and changing social mores; post-colonial identities and multiculturalism." Across these tendencies, "the exploration of performance and the performative body" is a common running thread. Singapore carries a notable history of performance art, with the government historically having enacted a no-funding rule for that specific art form from 1994 to 2003, following a controversial performance artwork at the 5th Passage art space.

== Ancient Singapore ==
=== Artefacts and artistic traditions of the Malay world ===
Situated in the Malay Archipelago, Singapore is connected to the broader sculptural, textile, and decorative art traditions of the Malay world.

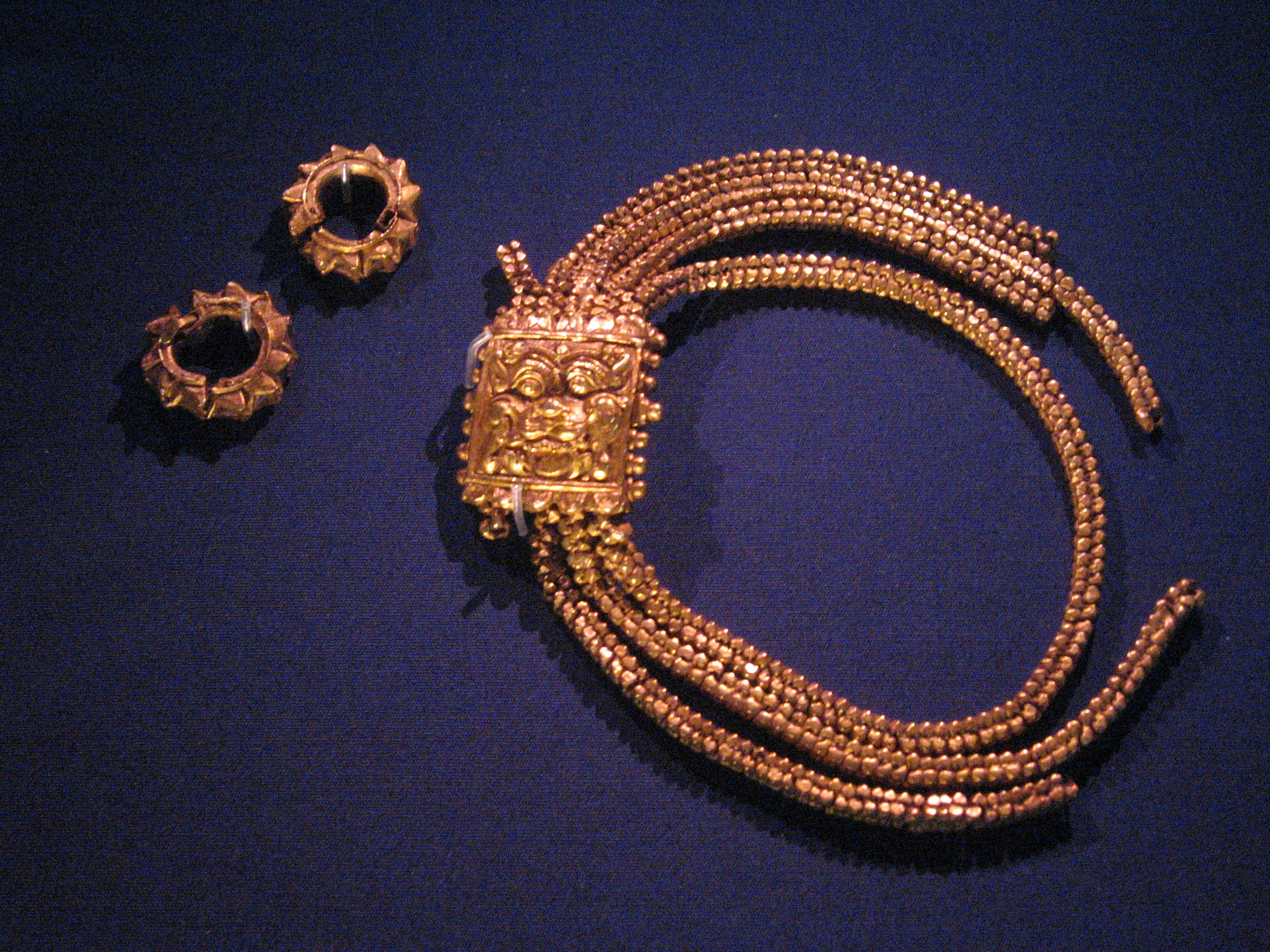
Javanese-style gold jewellery discovered at Bukit Larangan (Fort Canning Hill), 14th century, National Museum of Singapore

A 14th-century golden armlet bearing a repoussé plaque of the Javanese Kala was excavated from Bukit Larangan (Fort Canning Hill) in 1926, demonstrating a link between Singapore and classical Malay sultanates. The kala motif draws from Hindu mythology, and traditionally adorns the top of main entrances of temples and is found in many parts of Indonesia. Demonstrating the use of metalworking techniques, the armlet dates back to the 14th century, around the time a possible Kingdom of Singapura would have been thriving on the island, complementing indigenous Malay writings about the presence of a state in Singapore headed by a Malay elite. The armlet also demonstrates the influence of the Hindu cosmology for Malays in their pre-Islamic past.

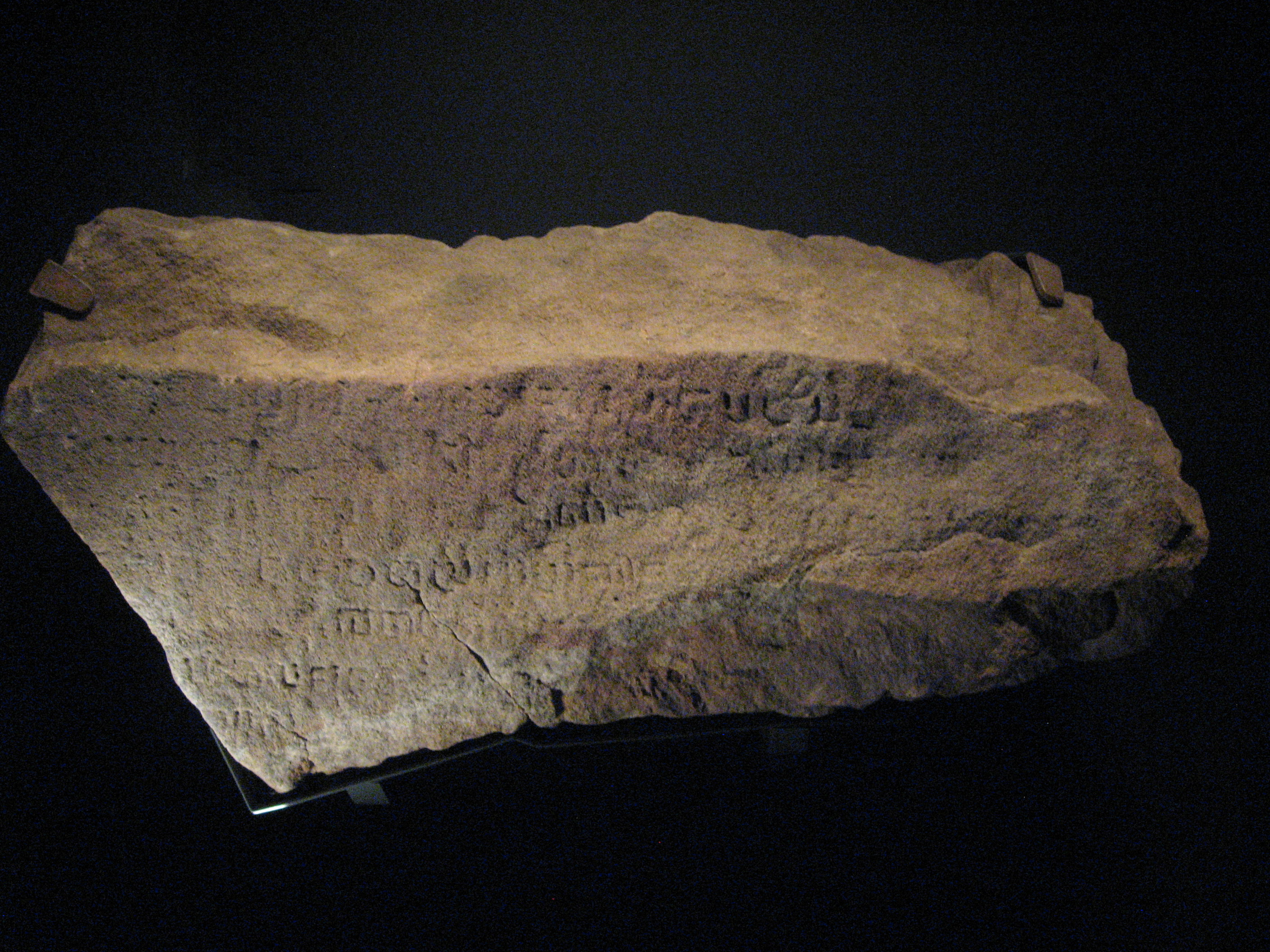
A fragment of the Singapore Stone, inscribed with an unknown script, c 10th to 13th century.

Another significant artefact is the Singapore Stone, a surviving fragment of a large sandstone slab inscribed with Indic script that stood at the mouth of the Singapore River, measuring 3 metres in height and width. Believed to date back to at least the 13th century and possibly as early as the 10th or 11th century, the inscription remains undeciphered. More recent theories suggest that the inscription is either in Old Javanese or in Sanskrit, which suggests the possibility that the island was an extension of the Majapahit civilisation in the past. About January 1843, the slab was blown to pieces to widen the passageway at the mouth of the Singapore River to make space for Fort Fullerton and for the quarters of its commander, leaving only fragments of the slab.

=== Early cartographic references ===
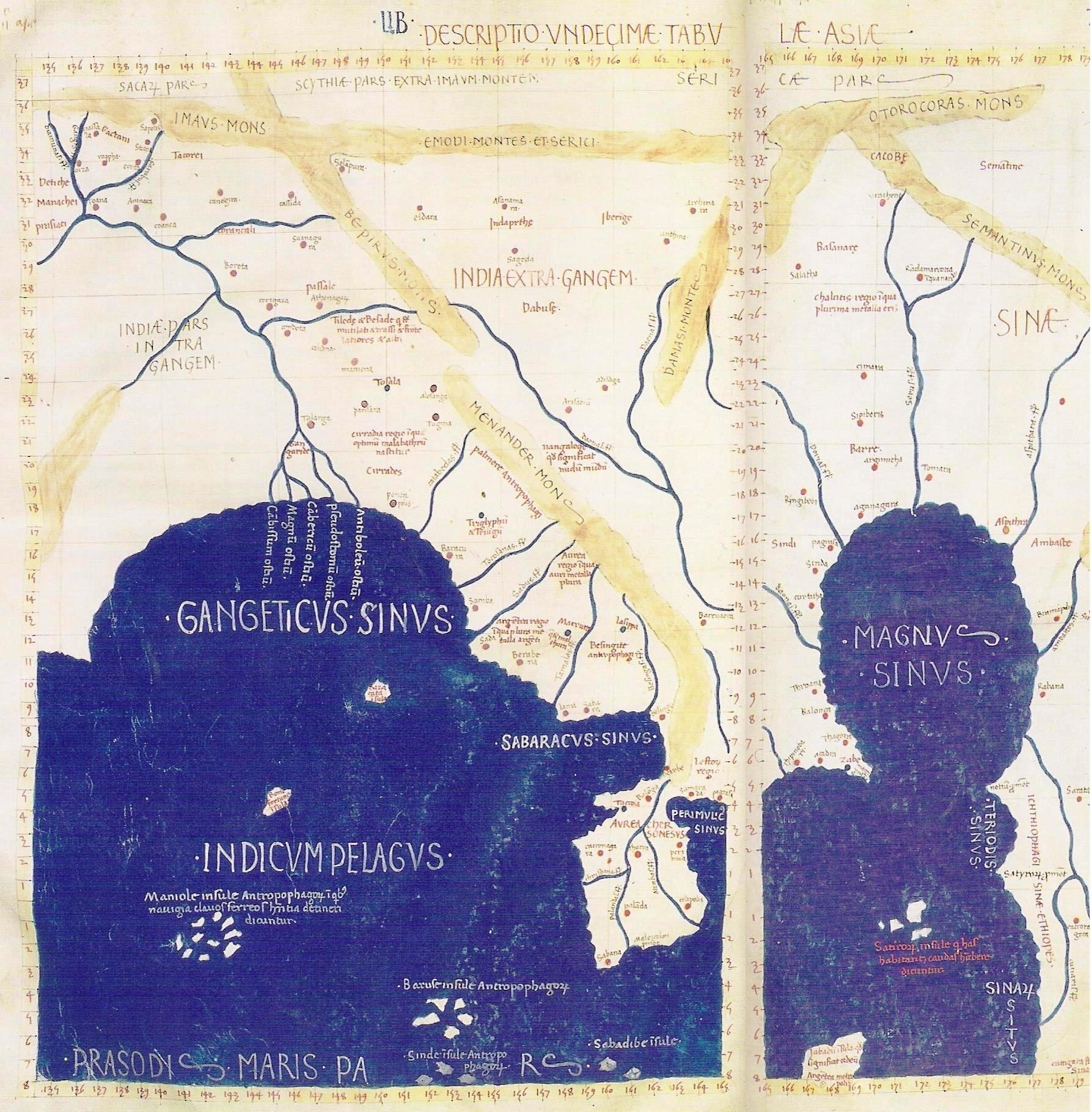
Ptolemy, Geographia, VIII. 11th Map of Asia. Sabana given at the tip of the Malay Peninsula which was named as the Golden Khersonese.

The earliest depictions of ancient Singapore existed predominantly in textual and cartographical forms, with the first possible mention being a 2nd-century CE cartographic reference in Greco-Roman astronomer Ptolemy's Geographia. A place called Sabana or Sabara was marked on the 11th Map of Asia at the southern tip of the Golden Khersonese (meaning the Malay Peninsula) where Singapore may lie.

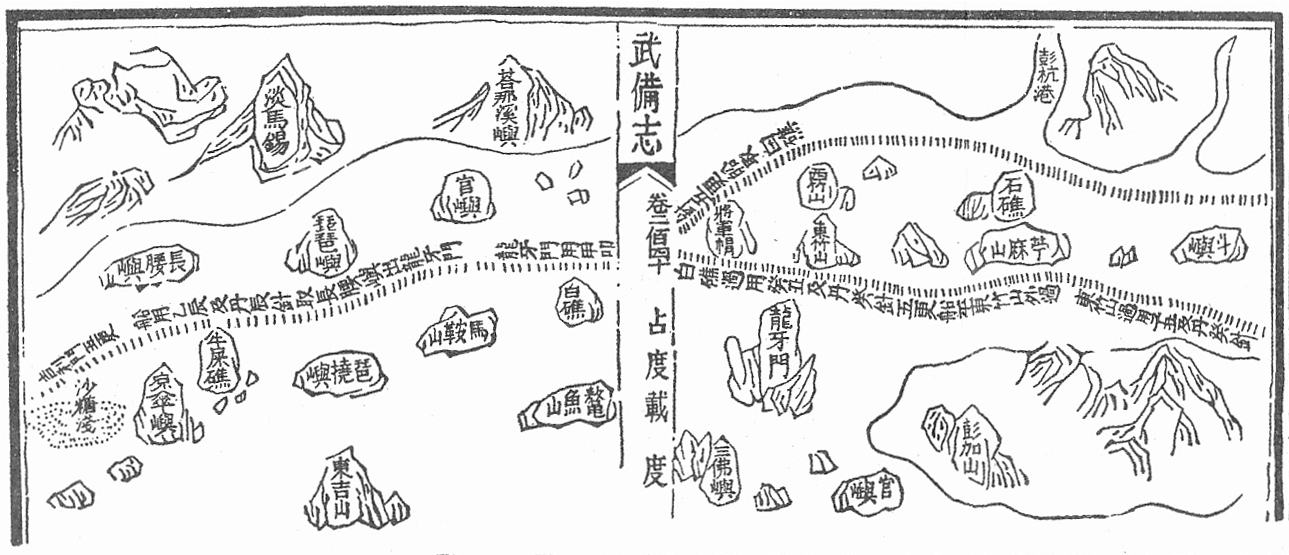
The Mao Kun map from Wubei Zhi which is based on the early 15th century maps of Zheng He showing Temasek (淡馬錫) at the top left, and Long Ya Men (龍牙門) on the right panel.

Early Singapore came to be known as "Temasek", a name possibly deriving from "tasik" (Malay for lake or sea) and taken to mean Sea-town in Malay. The landscape of Temasek (淡馬錫) is visually depicted in the Mao Kun map, a set of navigation charts published in the Ming dynasty military treatise Wubei Zhi. Long Ya Men (龍牙門, Dragon's Teeth Gate) is also depicted within the map, believed to be the entrance to Keppel Harbour. In his work Daoyi Zhilüe, Wang Dayuan described Long Ya Men as the two hills of Temasek that looked like "Dragon's teeth" between which a strait runs; Longyamen was written about here as one of two settlements in Temasek, the second being Banzu. The map is often regarded as a surviving document from the expeditions of Zheng He, in addition to accounts written by Zheng's officers.

Sometime in its history, the name of Temasek was changed to Singapura. The Sejarah Melayu (Malay Annals) contains a tale of a prince of Srivijaya, Sri Tri Buana (also known as Sang Nila Utama), who landed on Temasek after surviving a storm in the 13th century. According to the tale, the prince saw a strange creature, which he was told was a lion; believing this to be an auspicious sign, he decided to found a settlement called Singapura, which means "Lion City" in Sanskrit. It is unlikely there ever were lions in Singapore, though tigers continued to roam the island until the early 20th century.

== Colonial Singapore (1819–1942) ==
From the 16th to 19th centuries, starting with the arrival of the Portuguese at Malacca in 1509, the Malay Archipelago was gradually taken over by European colonial powers. During the 17th century, the early dominance of the Portuguese was challenged by the Dutch, who came to control most of the ports in the region, while colonial powers such as the British had a relatively minor presence. Sir Stamford Raffles, appointed as the Lieutenant Governor of the British colony at Bencoolen in 1818, arrived in Singapore on 28 January 1819 and soon recognised the island as a choice for a new port. Raffles sought to challenge the Dutch by establishing a new port along the Straits of Malacca, which served as the main ship passageway for India-China trade. A formal treaty was signed on 6 February 1819, ushering in Singapore's colonial period. The British concentrated on building infrastructure such as housing, roads, and hospitals in order to maintain the economy, and did not set up an art academy. While Raffles did intend for the teaching of art, the first British art teacher, Richard Walker, would only arrive almost a hundred years after Raffles' death in 1923.

During this period, the art of Singapore was diverse, influenced by travellers, itinerant artists, and migrants from China, the Indian subcontinent, as well as the West, all bringing different pictorial traditions. From the 19th century, European perecptions of Singapore are seen through art that depicted "tropical" motifs like palm trees, kampungs, and studies of locals. These motifs appear in the works of Singapore artists from the 1930s onwards.

=== Early visual records as a British settlement (19th century) ===
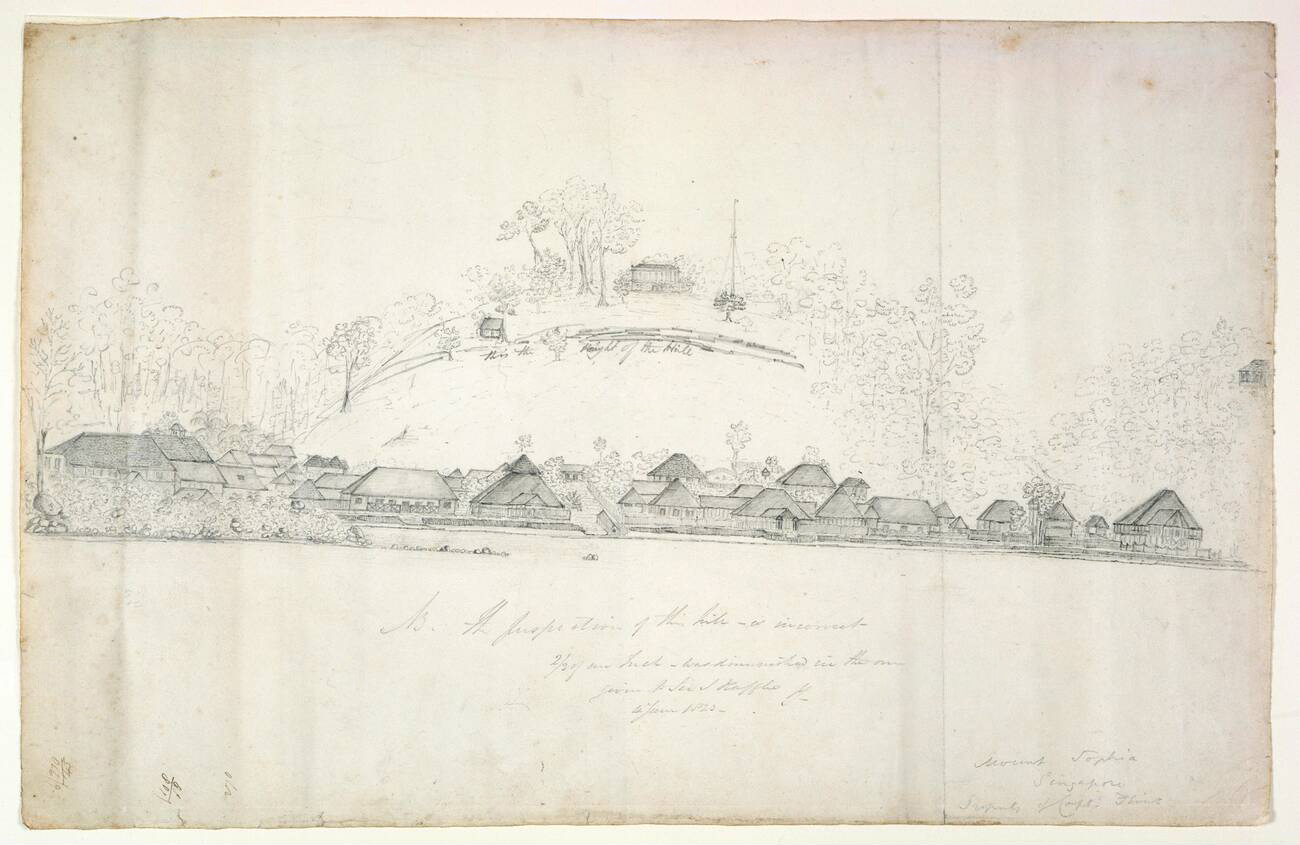
Philip Jackson, A View of Singapore from the Sea, June 1823, Pencil sketch

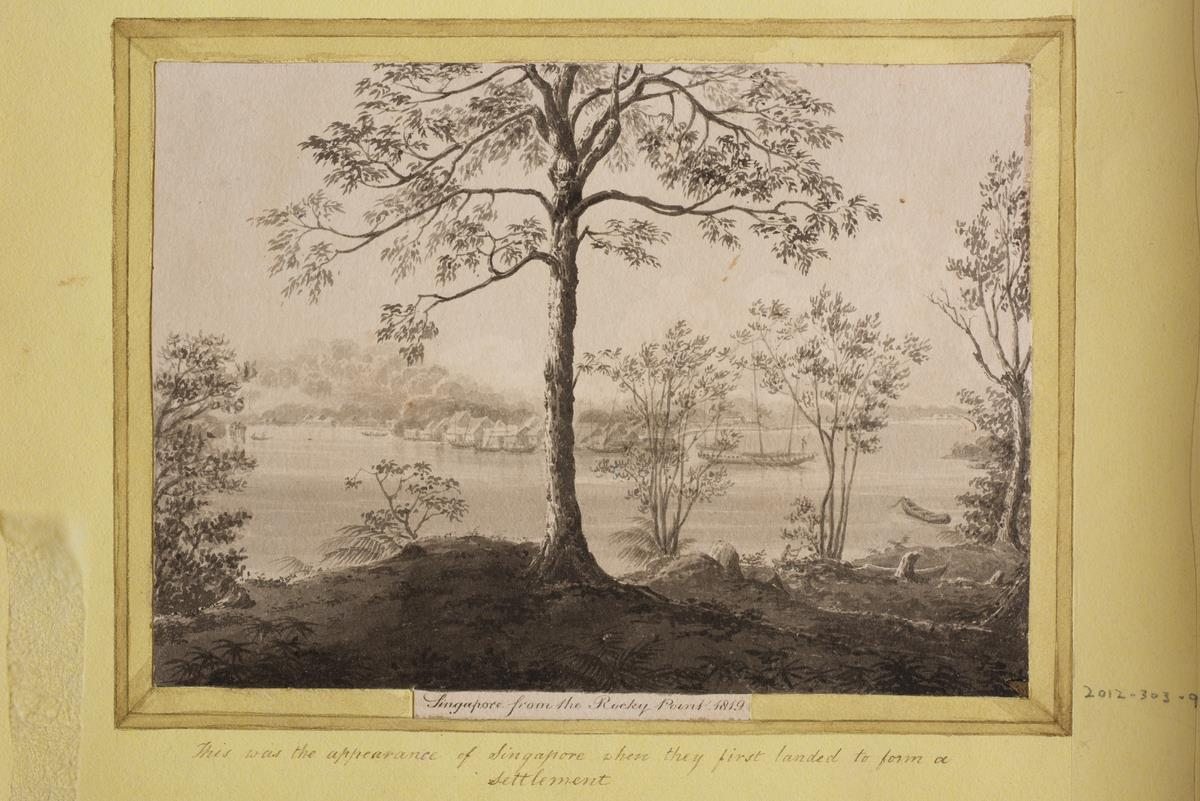
John Michael Houghton, Singapore from the Rocky Point, 1819, 1819, 13 x 18 cm, National Museum of Singapore

The earliest visual records of Singapore as a British settlement are 19th century images produced for marine coastal surveying. One of the earliest is Singapore from the Rocky Point, 1819, a wash drawing by John Michael Houghton, a midshipman on board HMS Discovery, part of the naval escort accompanying Raffles on his journey to Singapore in 1819. Created when Raffles first set foot on Singapore, it is one of 41 drawings from the Houghton Album, a compilation of views drawn by Houghton. Other early hydrographic sketches include Philip Jackson's A View of Singapore from the Sea, dated 1823, and others by an unknown draughtsman on a marine ship accompanying Raffles during his survey of Karimun Islands, Sketch of the Land round Singapore Harbour, dated February 1819, and Sketch of the Settlement of Singapore at anchor in 4 fathoms, dated April 1819.

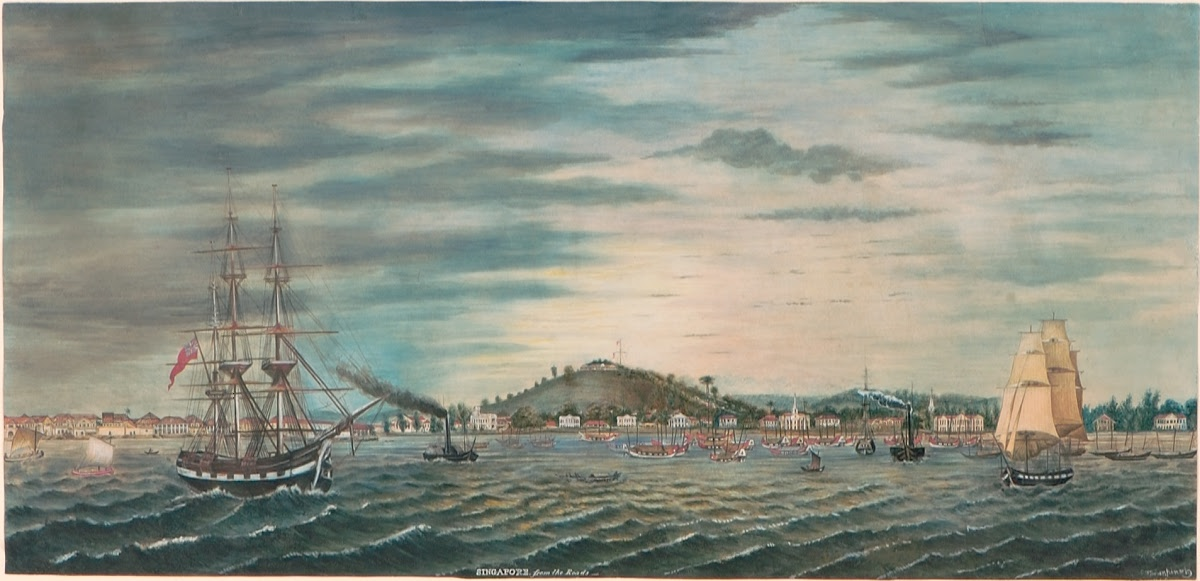
Robert Wilson Wiber, Panoramic View of Singapore from the Harbour, 1849, Watercolour and gouache on paper, 32 x 67.5 cm

These sketches were used for navigational purposes, though they visually resemble later landscape works created mainly for artistic expression. For example, Robert Wilson Wiber's watercolour painting, Panoramic View of Singapore from the Harbour (1849) depicts the island from the perspective of the sea. Singapore was largely known as a British port in the 19th century, with popular representations of Singapore including harbour and port scenes. Some of the early artists painting Singapore include John Turnbull Thomson and Charles Andrew Dyce, British officers in colonial Singapore who also worked in fields like surveying, architecture, and engineering.

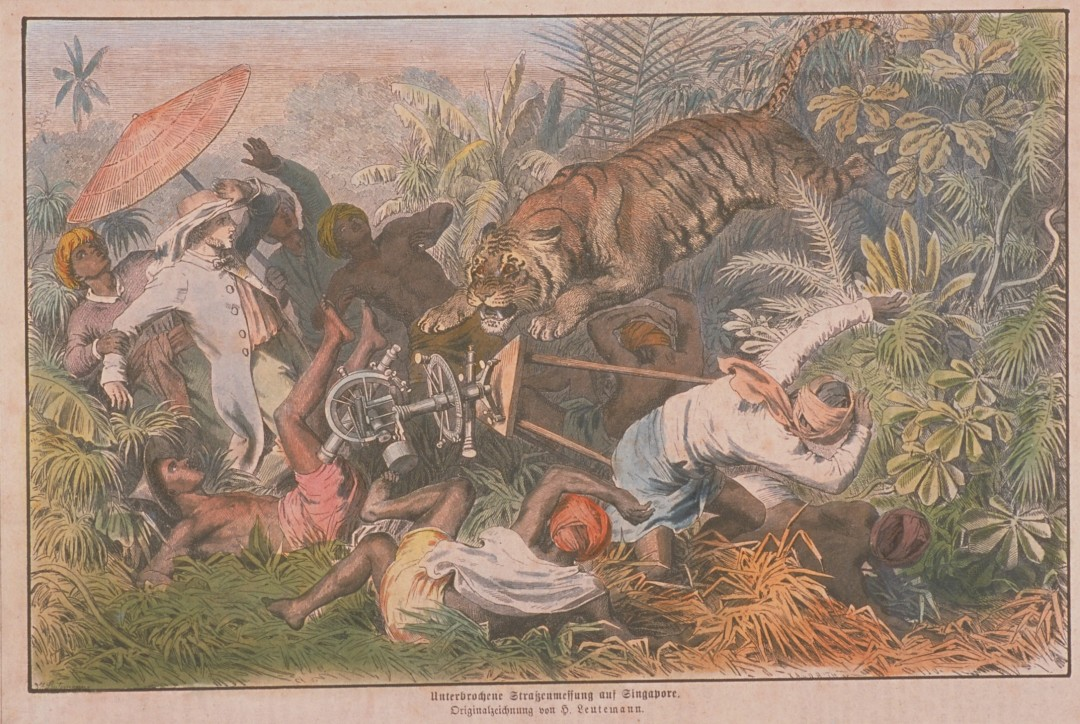
Heinrich Leutemann, Unterbrochene Straßenmessung auf Singapore (Interrupted Road Surveying in Singapore), c. 1865, Wood engraving on paper, National Museum of Singapore

In 1865, the German popular spreadsheet Die Gartenlaube published the article "Die Tigernoth in Singapore," which includes George Drumgoole Coleman's encounter with a tiger during a surveying trip near a jungle in Singapore in 1835, a lithographic print by Heinrich Leutemann accompanying the article. Titled Unterbrochene Straßenmessung auf Singapore (Road Surveying Interrupted in Singapore) (c. 1865–1885), it depicts the dramatic scene of the tiger leaping out from the jungle, knocking over Coleman's theodolite. The work has been of significant interest to recent scholarship, which focuses on the historical and metaphorical significance of the tiger. It has been suggested that the incident was exaggerated or did not truly occur, emphasising the imaginary surrounding the supposed dangers of the Southeast Asian jungle.

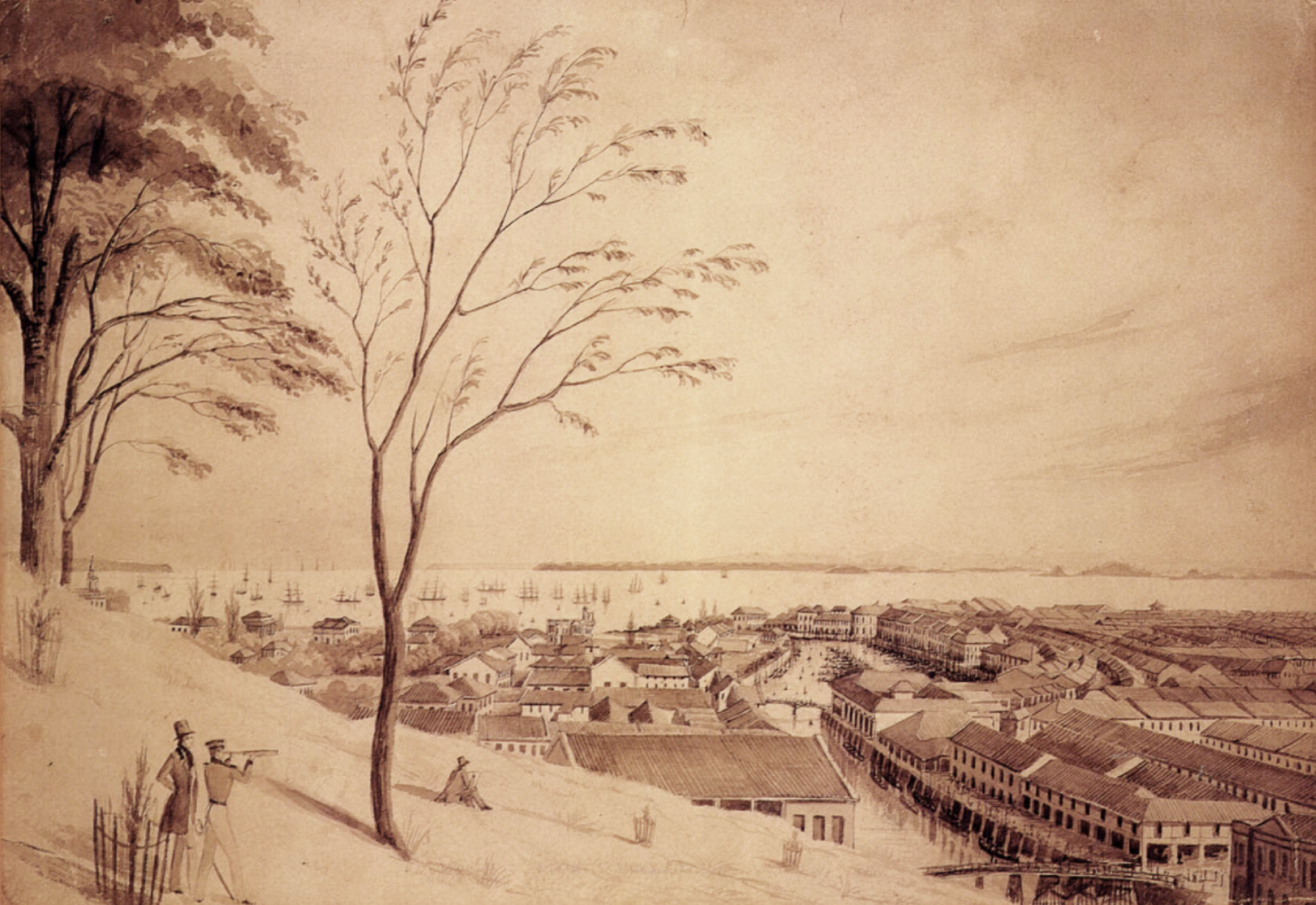
Charles Andrew Dyce, The Town and the Roadstead from Government Hill, 1842–47, Watercolour & ink on paper, 353 x 514 mm, NUS Museum

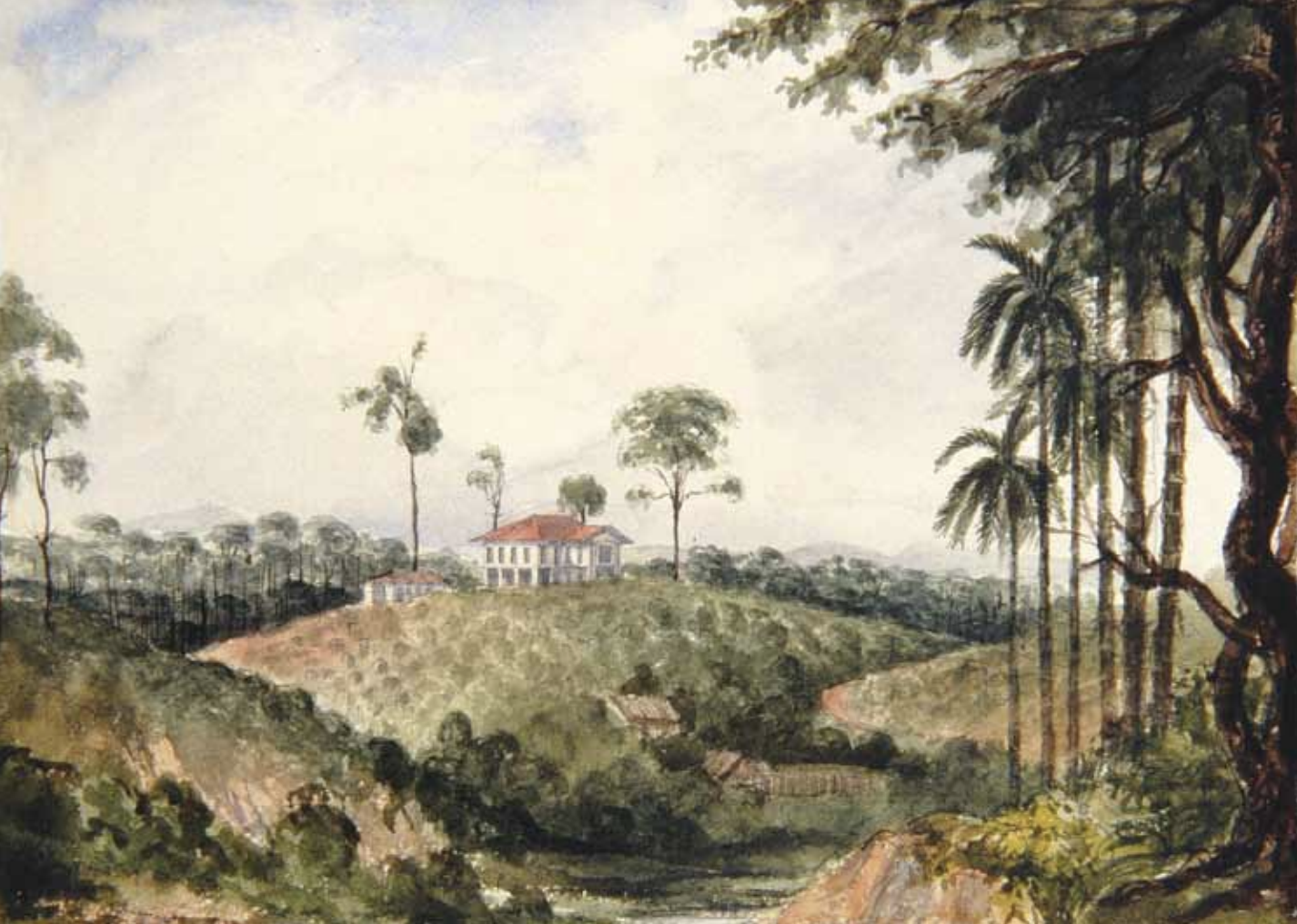
Charles Andrew Dyce, Cairnhill, Singapore, 1842, Watercolour & ink on paper, 263 x 363 mm, NUS Museum

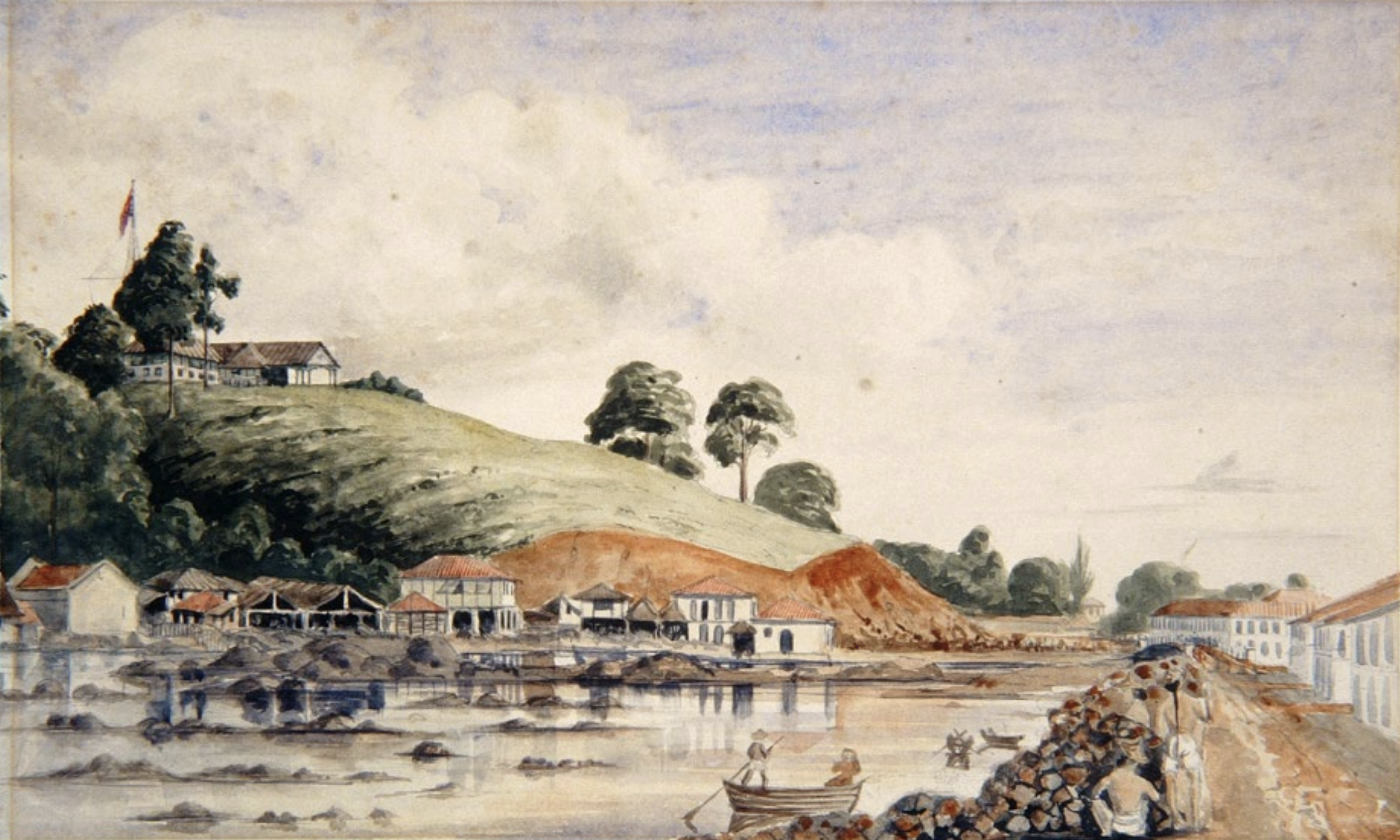
Charles Andrew Dyce, Government Hill from the New Harbour Road, Singapore, 1846, Watercolour & Ink on paper, 27.2 x 44.8 cm, NUS Museum

=== Natural history drawings ===
William Farquhar commissioned natural history drawings during his time as Resident of Malacca from 1803 to 1818. Part of ongoing colonial scientific projects to study and gather knowledge about the Malay Archipelago, these were some of the earliest visual practices of the region. While the artists are unknown, it is theorised that Chinese artists in mid-19th century Malaya were commissioned to produce these drawings. Rock and tree motifs in the landscapes of these natural history drawings bear resemblance to the Chinese ink tradition.

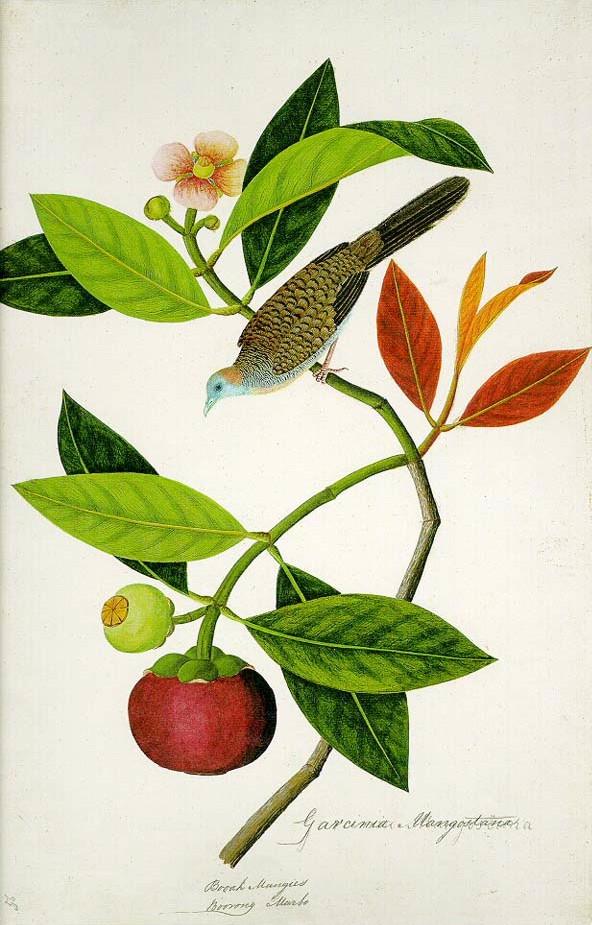
Garcinia Mangostana; Booah Mangies; Boorong Merbo (William Farquhar Collection, 1819–1823)

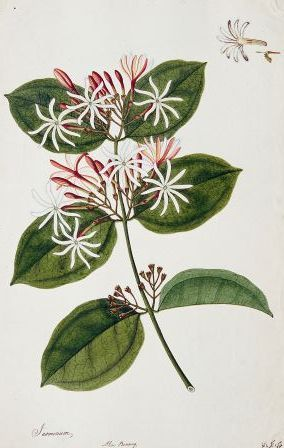
Jasminum; Akar Benang; Pokok Akar Banang (William Farquhar Collection, 1819–1823)

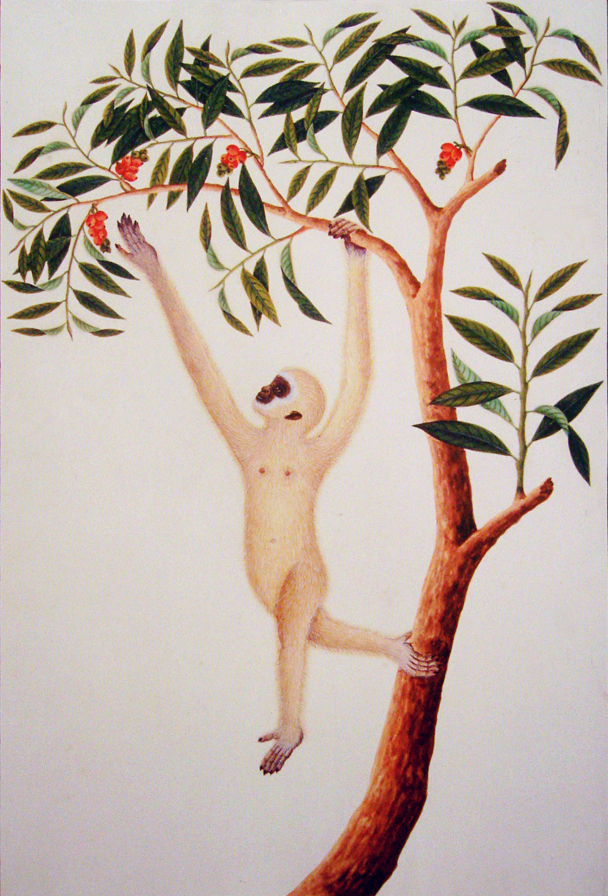
Onka' Pootie (William Farquhar Collection, 1819–1823)

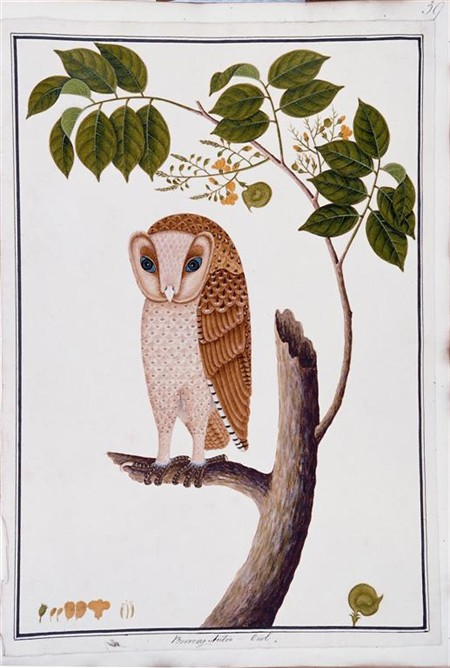
Boorong Antoo; Owl (William Farquhar Collection, 1819–1823)

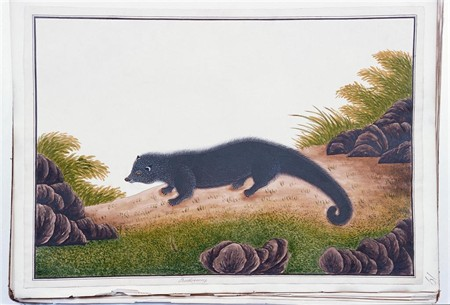
Bentoorong (William Farquhar Collection, 1819–1823)

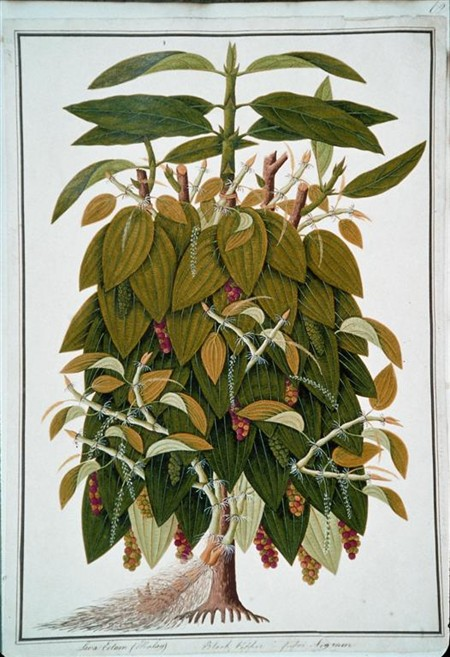
Lava Etam (Malay); Black Pepper; Piper Nigrum (William Farquhar Collection, 1819–1823)

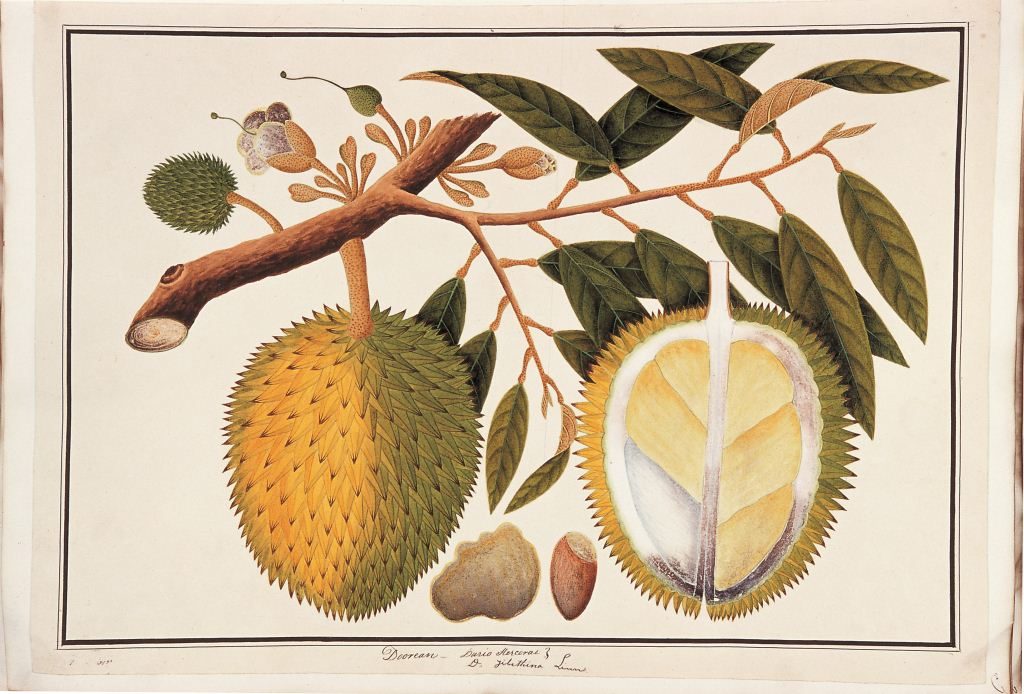
Doorean; Durio stercorae; D. zibethina Linn (William Farquhar Collection, 1819–1823)

=== Early photography ===
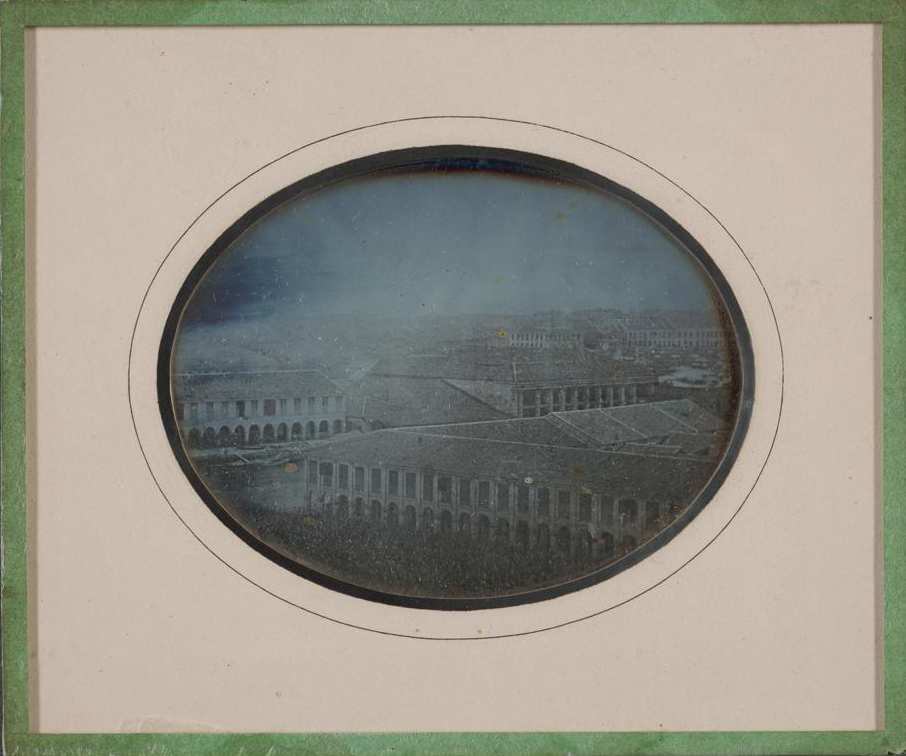
Jules Itier's 1844 daguerreotype of Boat Quay and Singapore River from Government Hill, 1844, 12.6 x 15 x 0.3 cm, National Museum of Singapore

The earliest surviving photographic views of Singapore as a British settlement are Jules Itier's 1844 daguerreotype of Boat Quay and Singapore River from Government Hill. Prominent commercial studios were founded by the 19th century, including Japanese and Chinese photography studios. One of these studios was founded by the German photographer August Sachtler, with A. Sachtler & Co.'s views of Singapore showing the advances in photography 20 years after Itier's daguerreotype.

Popular photographs by commercial studios in the late 19th to early 20th century included photographs of locals from different ethnic communities, which set up visual tropes to be associated with specific identities.

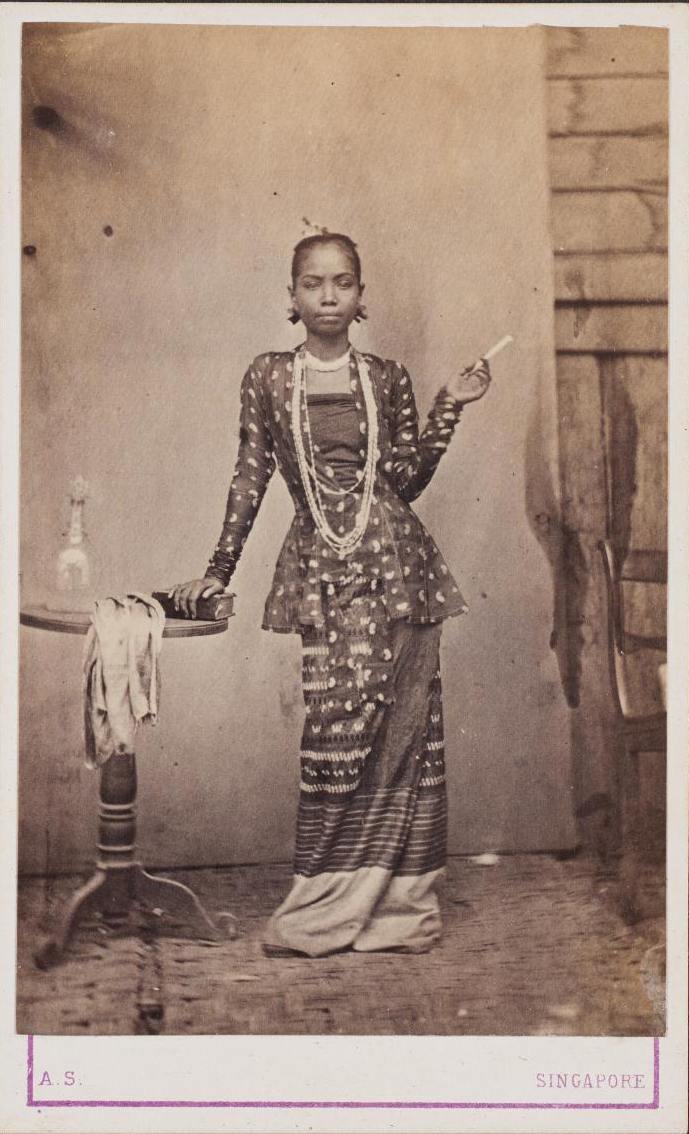
August Sachtler, Untitled photograph (portrait of woman) from group of 20 cartes-de-visite portraits, c. 1860s, 10.2 x 6.2 cm, Collection of National Museum of Singapore

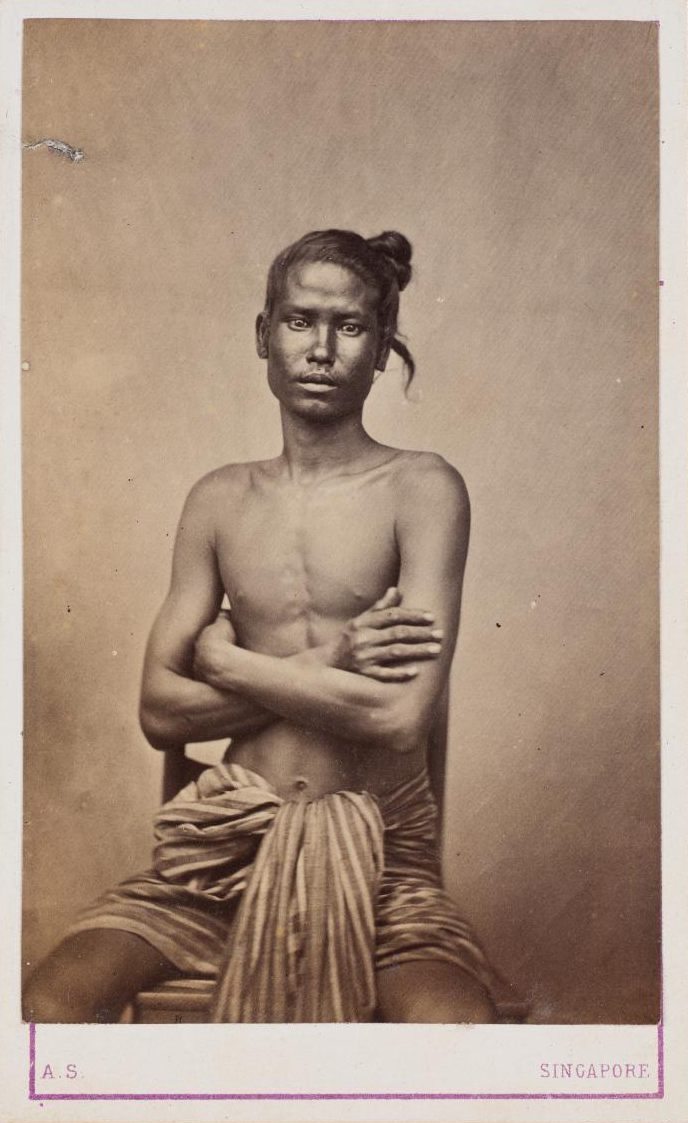
August Sachtler, Untitled photograph from group of 20 cartes-de-visite portraits, c. 1860s, 10.2 x 6.2 cm, Collection of National Museum of Singapore

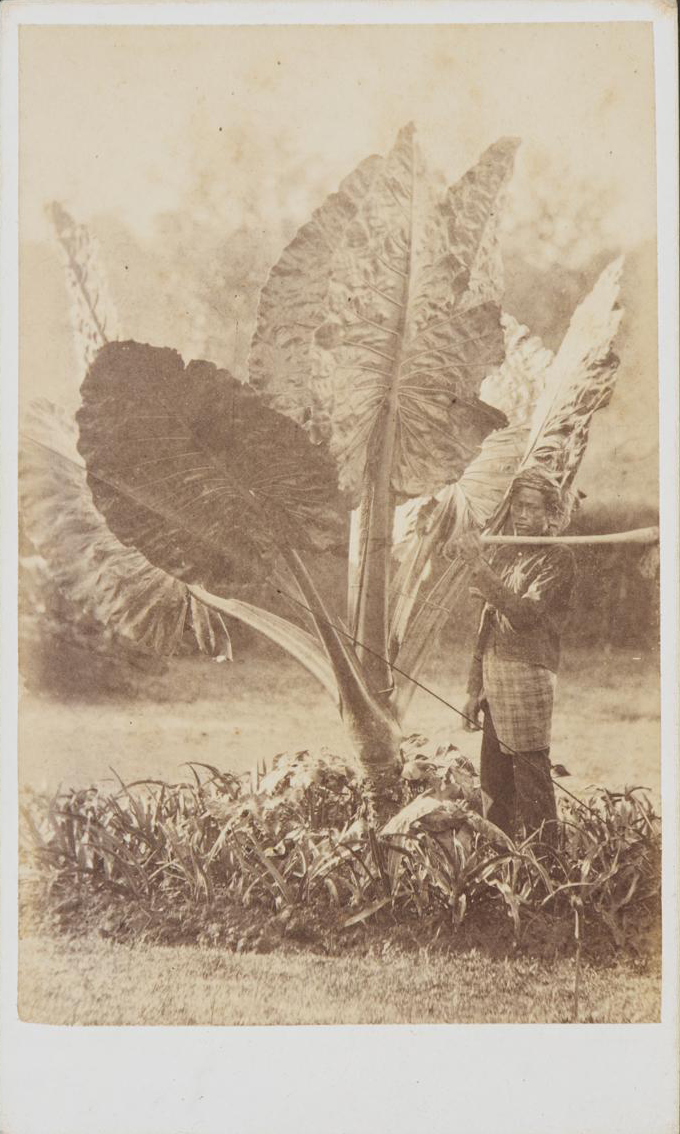
August Sachtler, A Calladium - Tanglin, Singapore, c. 1860s, Black-and-white photograph, 10.4 x 6.1 cm, National Museum of Singapore

=== Malay printed material ===
Singapore holds examples of the Malay Archipelago's tradition of illuminated manuscripts and early illustrated Malay newspapers, demonstrating the presence of visual modernity in the region during the 19th century.

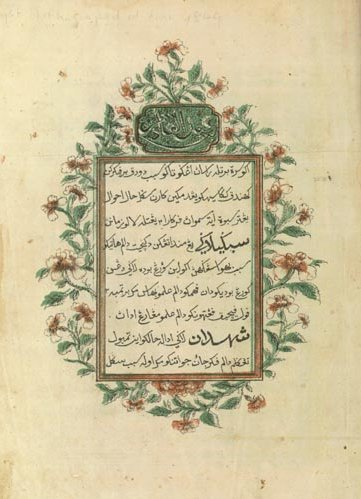
A page of the Hikayat Abdullah (1849) by Munshi Abdullah, written in Malay in the Jawi script, Collection of the National Library of Singapore

Scribes created illustrated motifs and decorations within books, as seen in the decorated frontispiece for the lithographic edition of Hikayat Abdullah (The Tale of Abdullah). This autobiography by Abdullah Abdul Kadir, better known as Munshi Abdullah, was lithographed at the Mission Press in Singapore in 1849, one of the first Malay language books published in print and written by someone who identified as Malay. The manuscript for Hikayat Abdullah has a frontispiece decorated with sketches of red and green floral motifs, including a simple frame. Here, the illustrator experiments with scripts darkened to suggest forms and shadows, providing the illusion of depth to the decorative patterns.

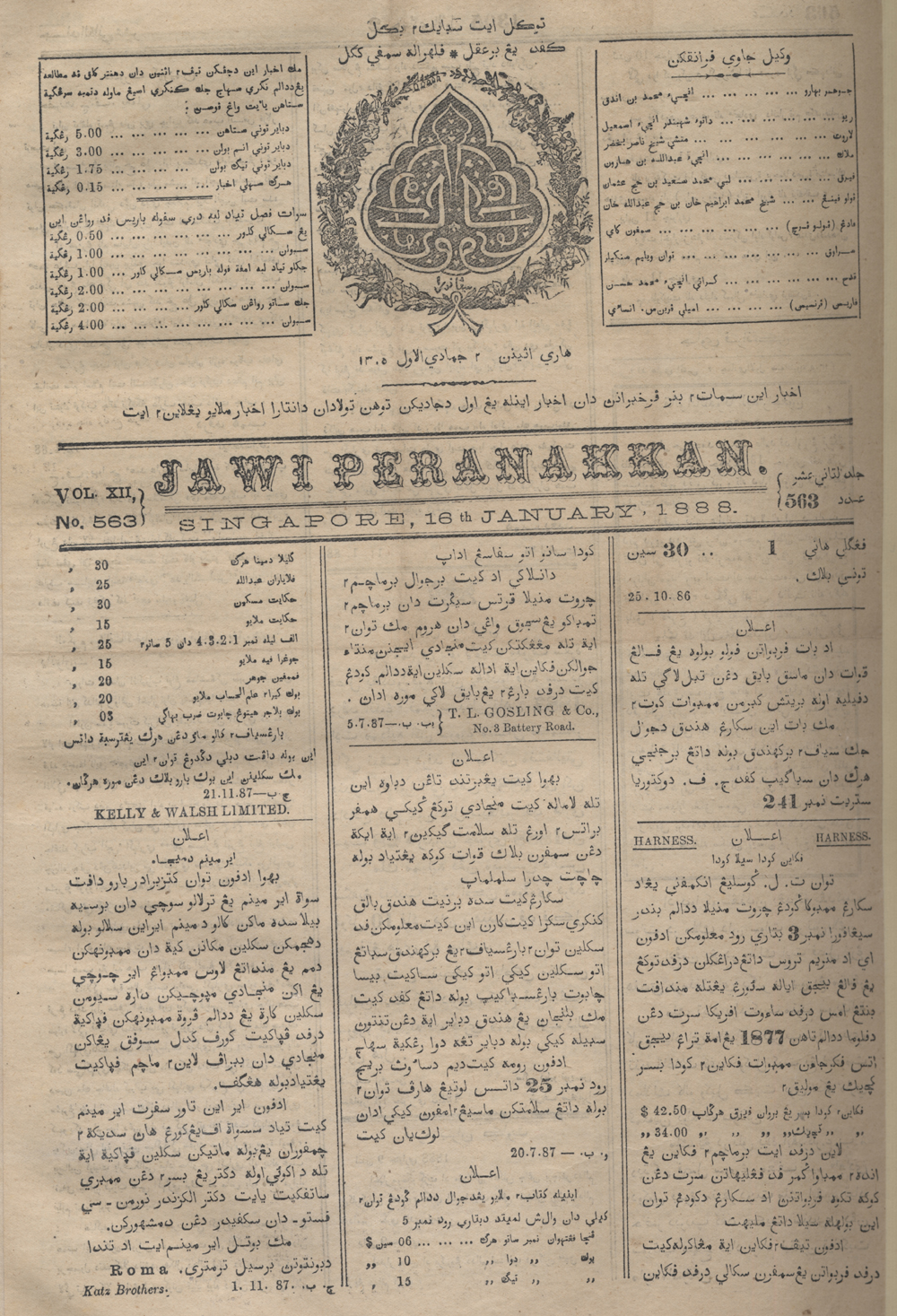
Front page of Jawi Peranakan on 16 January 1888, featuring an illustrated logo at its masthead

An early example of a Malay newspaper was the Jawi Peranakan, circulating from 1876 to 1895 for locals in Malaya. It was published in Jawi script and produced in Singapore as a main trading hub in the region. Jawi Peranakan had an illustrated logo depicting a pohon beringin (banyan tree) frame, which contained elaborate mirrored Jawi typography, contained within a garland.

Though Malay printing in the region was closely linked to the production of religious texts, publishing grew in its role in marketing, politics, and entertainment during the 20th century. There was a push for Malay identity to be viewed from more local or ‘peninsular’ perspectives, with Malay identity no longer strictly Islamic. Beyond text, discourse about Malay identity took visual form in 1930s satirical editorial cartoons and illustrated advertisements.

=== Chinese ink art ===
Singapore saw a huge influx of Chinese migrants by the 1840s, owing to the Opium Wars and high demands for labour in growing Southeast Asian markets. Chinese immigrants in Southeast Asia rarely came from the gentry class, who carried the traditional aesthetic values of artists in Chinese society. By the late 19th century, only a small number of cultural elites from the scholar-gentry class of China's imperial system were present to participate in and promote art in Singapore, such as poet Khoo Seok Wan, one of the few among Chinese immigrants in Singapore to pass the Qing court imperial examinations. The 1898 album Fengyue qinzun tu (Painting of Zither Romance) contains a portrait of Khoo, alongside examples of literati art circulated by cultural elites to the local community, such as ink painting, calligraphy, and seal carving with literature.

Chinese calligraphy was practiced in Singapore by Chinese intelligentsia as a means of self-cultivation. Esteemed poet and scholar Pan Shou had great influence on the early generation of Singaporean and Malayan calligraphers, who in turn taught the second generation of calligraphers that included Lim Tze Peng, Tan Siah Kwee, and Koh Mun Hung, whose practices matured after World War II. Later in the 1950s, Nanyang artists such as Chen Wen Hsi, Chen Chong Swee, and Cheong Soo Pieng employed modern variations in Chinese ink painting, as seen in Chen Wen Hsi's Playful Gibbons (c. 1980s).

=== Sculpture in colonial Singapore ===
Early instances of public sculpture in Singapore include architectural reliefs and commemorative monuments of colonial elites. A well-known example is the bronze statue of Stamford Raffles standing with arms folded, created by English sculptor Thomas Woolner and installed at the Padang in conjunction with the Golden Jubilee of Queen Victoria on 27 June 1887, now relocated at the Victoria Theatre and Concert Hall.

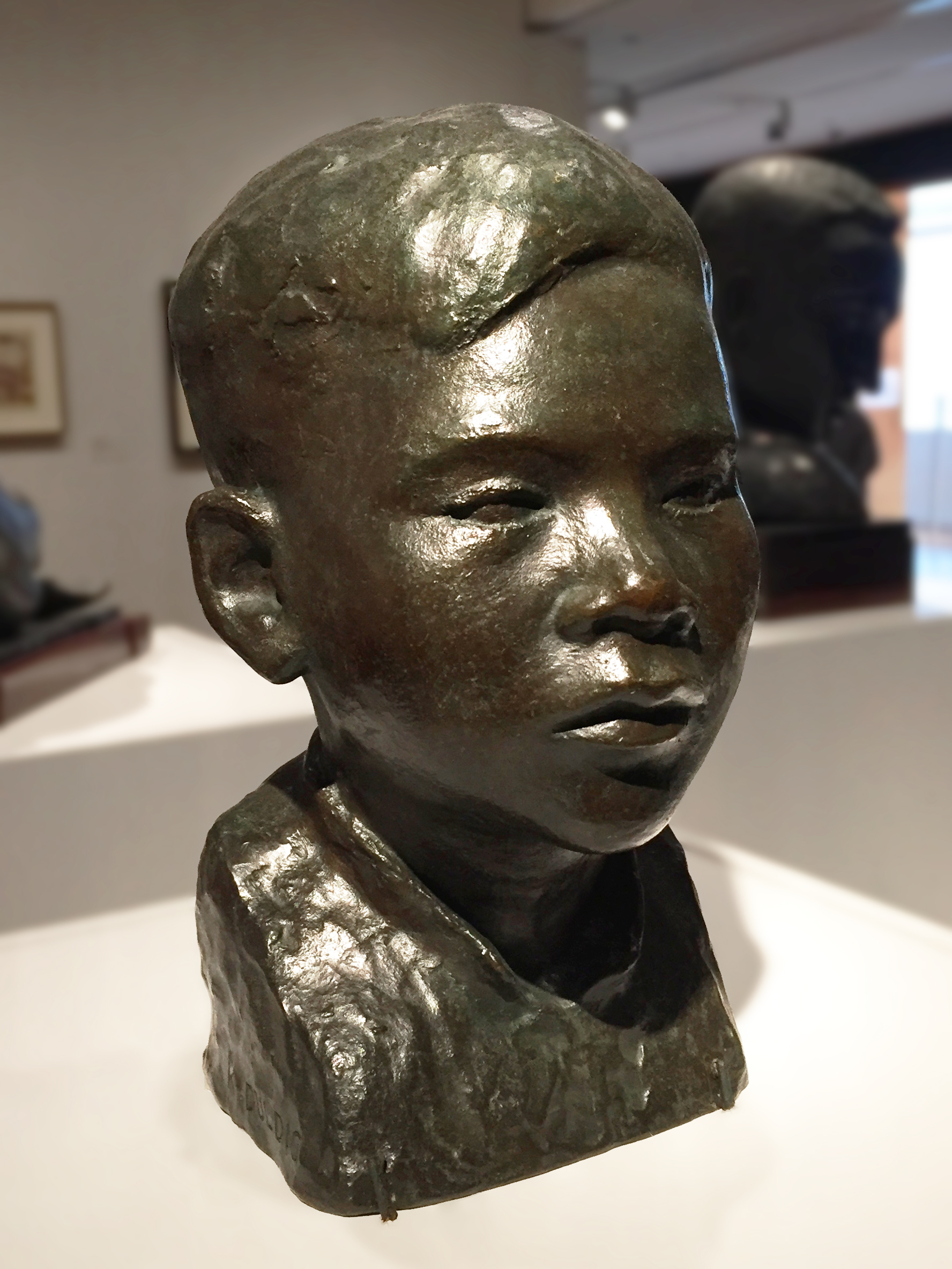
Karl Duldig, Malay Boy, 1939, Bronze sculpture, 6.3 x 29.5 x 20.8 cm, Collection of National Gallery Singapore

From the 1930s, European artists such as Dora Gordine, Karl Duldig, Rudolfo Nolli, Tina Haim-Wentscher, and Julius Wentscher received commissions to make public sculptures and reliefs during their short stays in Singapore. Nolli designed the marble decorations of the College of Medicine Building in 1926 and the Old Supreme Court Building in 1939. Sculptor Tina Haim-Wentscher and painter Julius Wentscher represented Malaya at the 1938 Glasgow Empire Exhibition, creating sculptures and designing a Malayan pineapple display.

Annaratnam Gunaratnam, Mavis, 1953, Bronze sculpture, 49.0 x 37.0 x 22.0 cm, Collection of National Gallery Singapore

Annaratnam Gunnaratnam was a sculptor who was also the head of the art department of Raffles Girls' Secondary School in Singapore from 1948 to 1968. Taught Indian technique and western style of painting in college, she came to Singapore by boat in 1939 from Madras with paintings and sculptures for an art exhibition in Kuala Lumpur, staying in Kuala Pilah through World War II and later migrating to Singapore in 1946. She specialised in portrait sculptures, being commissioned to create sculptures of Mahatma Gandhi and Swami Vivekananda for the Ramakrishna Mission Bartley Road, Singapore. Her sculpture, Mavis, demonstrates Gunnaratnam's technical ability in casting and depicting realist female sculptural forms with dignity, capturing details like the subject's facial expression and folds in her clothes.

Another example of sculpture from this period includes the stone sculptures accompanying graves at the Bukit Brown Municipal Cemetery, which opened 1922 and closed 1973. Detailed stone sculptures depicting Sikh guards, the Jade Maiden, and guardian lions accompany early 20th century graves.

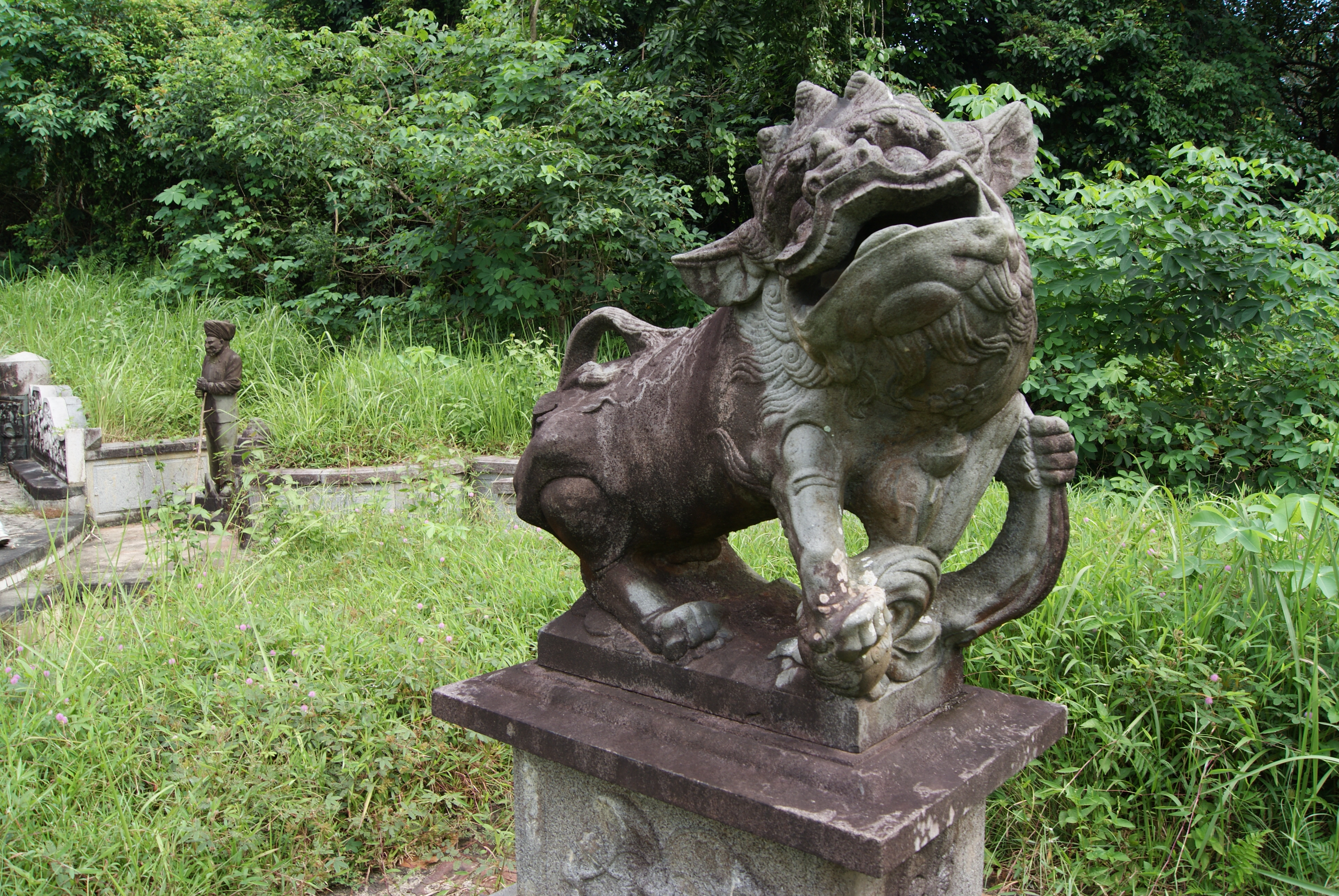
Artist unknown, Statue of guardian lion, located at the gravestones of Ong Sam Leong (d. 1918) and family members, Bukit Brown Cemetery, Singapore.

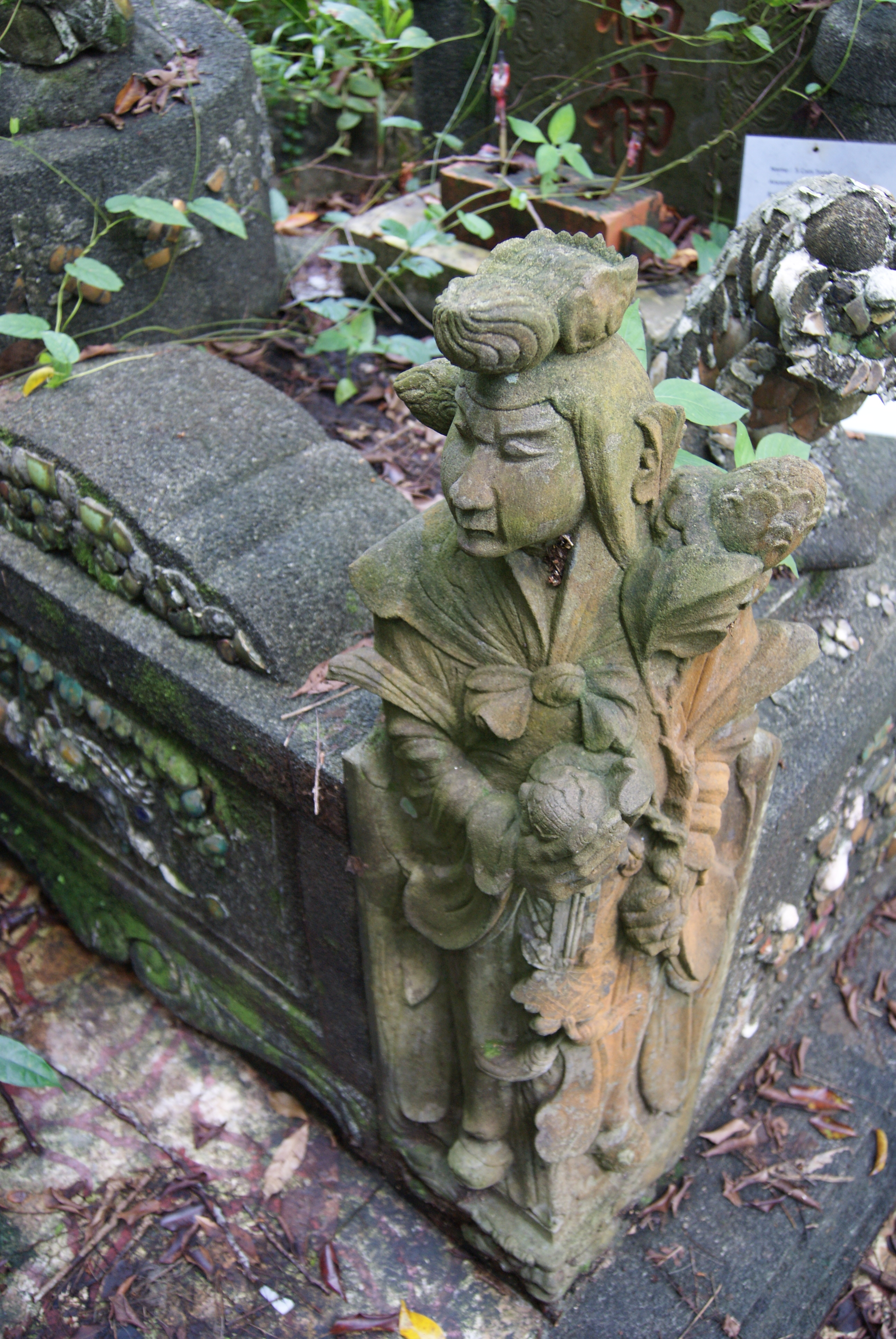
Artist unknown, Statue of the Jade Maiden, located at the tomb of Yeo Siew Keng (d. 1936), Bukit Brown Cemetery, Singapore.

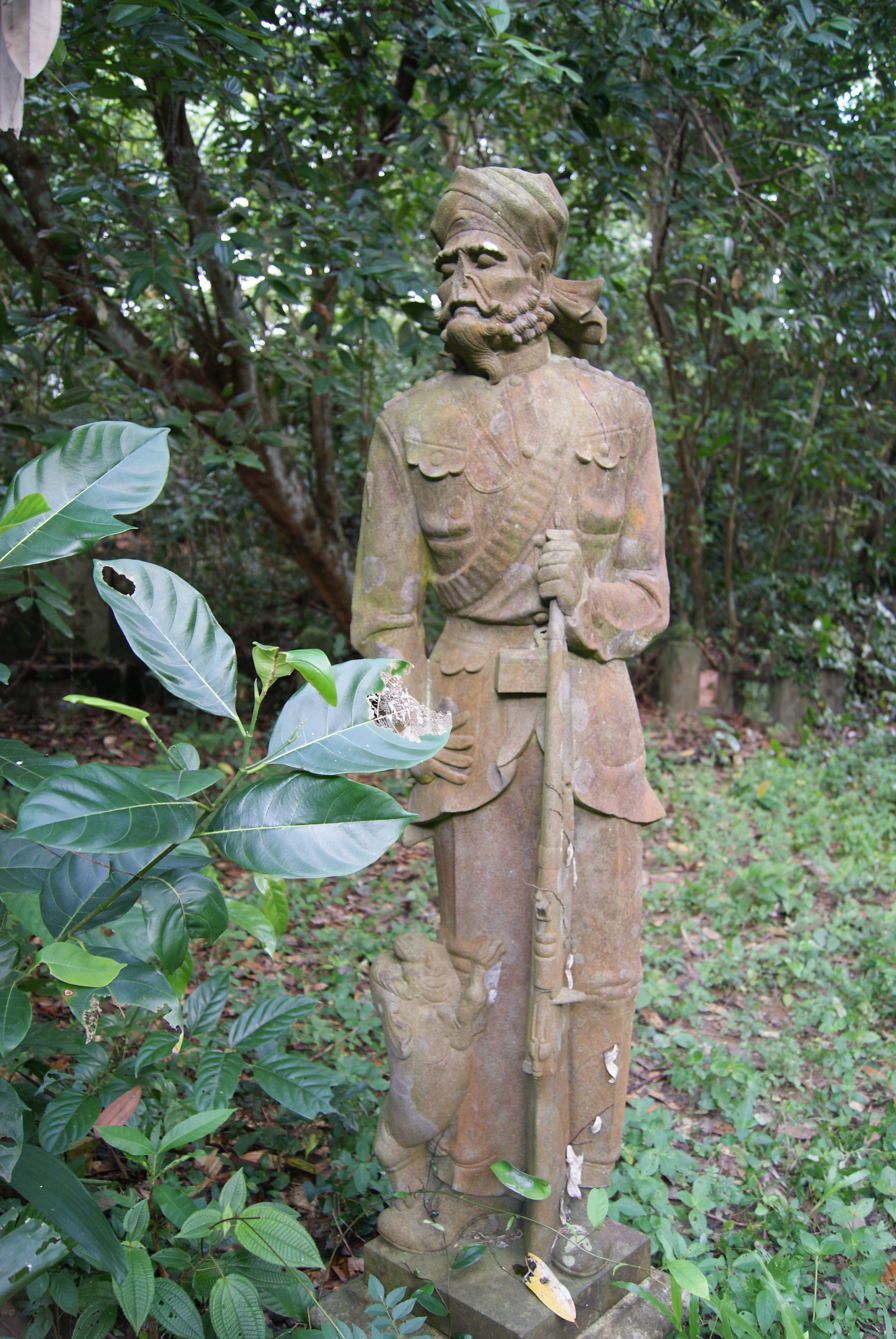
Artist unknown, Statue of Sikh guard, 1.83m (h), located at the tomb of Mr Wong Chin Yoke (d.1943), Bukit Brown Cemetery, Singapore.

=== Art associations, schools, and exhibitions ===
Low Kway Song, Lynx, 1921, Oil on canvas, 58.5 x 45 cm

The emergence of modern Singaporean art is often tied to the rise of art associations, art schools, and exhibitions in the 20th century. In 1909, the Amateur Drawing Association was founded. Led by its first president Tan Kok Tiong, had a club house in Amoy Street and a membership of about 50 in its first year. The association's activities included "drawing, literary pursuits and physical culture," but as there were few "drawing members" in spite of an exhibition of members' drawings held in February 1913. The Amateur Drawing Association suggests a social network of art enthusiasts who were associated with the Straits Chinese and British elite.

Low Kway Song's Lynx (1921) and Thai Temple (1923) are art historically notable as some of the few oil paintings from Singapore that can be traced to this moment of artistic production in the early 20th century.

== Japanese Occupation (1942–1945) ==
Richard Walker, Epiphany, 1942, Oil on board, 70 x 97 cm, Collection of National Gallery Singapore.

Artistic activity slowed down after World War II arrived in Singapore, with works reflecting artist's varied experiences of the war. Richard Walker's Epiphany (1942) was likely painted as a makeshift altarpiece in Changi Prison during the artist's internment there during the war. It is an oil painting that depicts the Virgin Mary as an Asian woman, suggesting the universality of Christian religious values.

In 1946, just after the war had ended, Liu Kang published Chop Suey, a multi-volume series of sketches that depicted Japanese brutality during wartime Malaya.

== Post-war period (1945–1955) ==
=== Society of Malay Artists Malaya (Late 1940s–50s) ===
Mohammed Salehuddin, Malay House, Malacca, c. 1960, Oil on canvas, 61 x 81.3 cm

On 1 May 1949 at the Kota Raja Club in Singapore's Kampung Glam, artists Mahat bin Chadang (C. Mahat) and Mohammed Salehuddin founded the Persatuan Pelukis Melayu Malaya (PPMM, Society of Malay Artists Malaya). The founding of the society is seen as an early instance of collective artistic organisation for Malay artists in Singapore.

PPMM artists did not follow a specific style, with artists such as Mohammad Salehuddin experimenting with cubism in his watercolour painting Bahana Asmara (Echo of Love), which depicted a sensual female nude with distorted features, while also being a comic illustrator. In contrast, his later painting from around 1960, Malay House, Malacca, accurately depicts a Malaccan-style longhouse in a realistic manner, down to the floral tiles of the staircase, demonstrating the PPMM artists' wide range of styles.

=== Nanyang Style (Late 1940s–50s) ===
Georgette Chen, Sweet Rambutans, 1965, Oil on canvas

Artists such as Chen Wen Hsi, Cheong Soo Pieng, and Fan Chang Tien, affected by tumultuous sociopolitical changes in China, moved to Singapore from the 1930s onwards, creating conditions for a unique local art movement called the Nanyang style of painting. The name of the movement draws from "Nanyang" (Chinese: 南洋; pinyin: nán yáng; lit. 'Southern Ocean'), a sinocentric Chinese term that refers to Southeast Asia from the geographical perspective of China.

Migrant Chinese artists painting in the Nanyang style from the late 1940s to 1960s are some of the most well-known visual practices in the history of Singapore art. As immigrant artists attracted to unfamiliar tropical landscapes, the Nanyang artists painted local Southeast Asian landscapes and subject matter such as tropical fruit, kampung scenes, and batik fabric while combining Western watercolor, oil painting, and Chinese ink traditions. Some of the most well-known Nanyang artists are Georgette Chen, Chen Chong Swee, Chen Wen Hsi, Cheong Soo Pieng, and Liu Kang.

Liu Kang, Artist and Model, 1954, Oil on canvas, 84 x 124cm, Collection of National Gallery Singapore

The Nanyang artists Liu Kang, Cheong Soo Pieng, Chen Wen Hsi, and Chen Chong Swee famously embarked on a 1952 painting trip to Bali, creating paintings of Balinese landscapes and people. Based on a sketch from this trip, Liu Kang's Artist and Model (1954) is a painting of fellow artist Chen Wen Hsi while he sketches a Balinese woman. The white outlines used in the painting are said to be inspired by batik painting.

=== Pictorialism and salon photography (1950s–60s) ===
Pictorialism by photographers in Singapore is defined as "an assertion of individual expression that manifested as a distinct pluralism of styles and subject matter", with an emphasis on "expression and beauty" in their photographs. This is different from earlier pictorial photographers in Europe and North America, who were working towards getting photography recognised as fine art. Singaporean photographers, who had art exhibitions featuring photographs with paintings from 1951, did not face the same tensions between photography and painting, and were thus more open to a variety of photographic styles.

== Self-government (1955–1963) ==
=== Social Realism and the Equator Art Society (mid-1950s–70s) ===
The Equator Art Society was an artists' group founded in 1956 in Singapore, known for promoting social realist art. The Equator Art Society sought to represent the realities and struggles of the masses, depicting Singapore's working classes and the poor often through the use of portraiture painting, woodcut prints, and sculpture.

=== Internationalism and abstract art ===
Kim Lim, Column, 1971–72, Stainless steel, 5 parts, each 21.7 x 27 x 51 cm

Artists such as Anthony Poon, Thomas Yeo, Goh Beng Kwan, and Kim Lim were influenced by their time overseas, with their work reminiscent of the visual language of Abstract Expressionism, Op Art, and Minimalism. For example, Singaporean-British artist Kim Lim's stainless steel sculpture, Column (1971–72), has been seen as an instance of Minimalist art in Britain.

=== Association of Artists of Various Resources (APAD) ===
In April 1961, the art section of Lembaga Tetap Kongres Bahasa dan Kebudayaan Melayu (LTK, Permanent Board of Congress of Malay Language and Culture) staged a major exhibition at the Victoria Memorial Hall. The exhibition featured the works of 34 Malay artists, both established and emerging. The exhibition publication documented works in the show from established artists such as C. Mahat, Sulaiman Haji Suhaimi, M. Salehuddin, M. Sawoot, Aman Ahmad, and younger artists like Abdul Ghani Hamid, S. Mohdir, S. Mahdar and Rohani Ismail. Calls for an art society for Malay artists led to the formation of the Angkatan Pelukis Aneka Daya (APAD, Association of Artists of Various Resources) in July 1962. APAD was led by Abdul Ghani Hamid, Muhammad Ali Sabran, S. Mohdir, Ahmin Haji Noh, Hamidah M. F. Suhaimi and Mustafa Yassin. Other members that came to contribute to APAD include Rohani Ismail, Maisara (Sara) Dariat, Rosma Mahyuddin Guha, and Hamidah Jalil.

The association continues to organise solo and group exhibitions, also collaborating with other cultural groups, art societies, and institutions, locally and regionally.

== Merger with Malaysia (1963–1965) ==
On 16 September 1963, the merger between Malaya, Singapore, North Borneo (renamed Sabah), and Sarawak took place, marking the official formation of Malaysia.

=== Modern Art Society ===
The Modern Art Society (MAS), launched with Ho Ho Ying as president in 1963, organised the exhibition titled Modern Art at the National Library from 12 October to 27 October 1963. The aims of the MAS included "the promotion of modern art in Malaysia," with the use of "Malaysia" rather than 'Malaya' or 'Singapore' pointing to this specific period when Singapore was part of Malaysia. The MAS hoped for the Modern Art exhibition to travel through Malaysia, including to cities like Kuala Lumpur.

The Modern Art exhibition was given prominent local media coverage, especially through Chinese newspapers and English-language The Straits Times. A week into the Modern Art exhibition, a painting by Tay Chee Toh was reported in the newspapers to have been slashed by another artist whose practice the MAS had rejected as outmoded, demonstrating the tensions surrounding abstract painting and its role in society. The founding of the MAS thus positioned abstract painting as a modern visual language in 1960s Singapore, instead of social realist painting.

== Republic of Singapore (1965–present) ==
Cheo Chai-Hiang, 5' x 5' (Singapore River), 1972, remade for display in 2006, Mixed media, 150 x 150 cm

The 1970s saw artists shift away from modern art practices like sculpture and painting, towards contemporary art practices like video, installation, and conceptual art. Contemporary art in Singapore tends to examine themes of "hyper-modernity and the built environment; alienation and changing social mores; post-colonial identities and multiculturalism." Across these tendencies, "the exploration of performance and the performative body" is a common running thread.

For example, often seen as an early example of conceptualism in Singapore is Cheo Chai-Hiang's 5' x 5' (Singapore River), where Cheo mailed a set of instructions from London to the Modern Art Society in Singapore. Here, he asked the Society to construct a square measuring 5 feet by 5 feet in the gallery space for their annual exhibition, an artwork proposal they eventually chose not to exhibit.

=== Trimurti ===
S. Chandrasekaran, Visvayoni, 1988, Mixed media on fabric

In March 1988, the three artists Salleh Japar, Goh Ee Choo, and S. Chandrasekaran refused to participate in their graduation show at Nanyang Academy of Fine Arts, instead holding an exhibition titled Trimurti at the Goethe-Institut in Singapore. The title Trimurti refers to Hinduism's triple deity, representing creation, maintenance, and destruction.

It was significant that the exhibition had a Hindu name, with Indians being an ethnic minority in Chinese-dominated Singapore and NAFA's teachers regularly teaching art in the Chinese language. The exhibition thus called out cultural biases at NAFA and asserted that non-Chinese identities were equally and unquestionably Singaporean.

The three artists sought to embrace differences as a collective, reflecting Singapore's multiculturalism through each of their racial and religious identities, as a Malay-Muslim for Salleh, Chinese-Buddhist for Goh, and Indian-Hindu for Chandrasekaran. For example, Chandrasekaran's work Visvayoni draws upon the term "yoni," the Sanskrit word for "womb," which is a symbol for the Mother Goddess Shakti from Hinduism. The performance Chandrasekaran did for the work thus symbolised processes of birth, creation, and change.

The three artists' approach to ethnic and religious identity has more recently been critiqued as a form of multicultural essentialism that reductively binds racial identities to religious affiliations, aligning with the government's insistence that racial identities had to be kept distinct under the government's version of "racial harmony".

Signboard leading to 61-B Lorong Gambas, The Artists Village (1988–1990). Photo by Koh Nguang How.

=== The Artists Village ===
The Artists Village (TAV) is known as Singapore's first art colony, founded by contemporary artist Tang Da Wu in 1988. From 1988 to 1990, it was located at a chicken farm at Lorong Gambas in Ulu Sembawang, which has since been redeveloped. TAV is known for its engagement with societal changes and issues through late-1980s and 1990s Singapore, with a particular emphasis on performance art, installation art, and process-based work. Other figures closely associated with TAV, apart from its founder Tang, include Amanda Heng and Lee Wen.

=== 5th Passage and performance art ban ===
The New Paper's cover story of Josef Ng's Brother Cane, "Pub(l)ic Protest", 3 January 1994

The 5th Passage Artists Limited, commonly known as 5th Passage or 5th Passage Artists, was an artist-run initiative and contemporary art space in Singapore from 1991 to 1994. As a registered, artist-led non-profit organisation, it was one of the earliest of its kind for early-1990s Singapore, with its initial space located at Parkway Parade, a shopping centre in the east of the city.

5th Passage was co-founded in 1991 by artists such as Suzann Victor and Susie Lingham. Art critic Lee Weng Choy describes 5th Passage as an initiative that had "focussed on issues of gender and identity, and on the work of women artists." The initiative's programming emphasised an interdisciplinary approach, exhibiting performance art, installation, music, photography, and design, also organising public readings and forums.

5th Passage is often associated with its role in staging the controversial 1994 performance artwork by Josef Ng, Brother Cane. Sensationalised media coverage of the performance led to a national outcry, leading to the eviction of 5th Passage from Parkway Parade and a ten-year suspension of funding for unscripted performance art in Singapore in what has been described as one of the "darkest moments of Singapore’s contemporary art scene."

Suzann Victor performing Still Waters (between estrangement and reconciliation) in 1998 at the Singapore Art Museum

In 1998, Victor performed the work Still Waters (between estrangement and reconciliation) at the Singapore Art Museum, a rare publicly staged performance work between 1994 and 2003, described by Victor as a response to the de facto performance art ban and the loss of the 5th Passage space.

=== 2000s onwards ===
In 2001, Singapore participated in the Venice Biennale with its own national pavilion for the first time, with artists Henri Chen KeZhan, Matthew Ngui, Salleh Japar, and Suzann Victor exhibiting work. Singapore continued its participation in the Venice Biennale with the exception of 2013, when the National Arts Council reassessed its participation in future biennales and resumed in 2015 after signing a 20-year lease on a national pavilion at the Arsenale in Venice. Documenta11 in 2002 would see the participation of Charles Lim and Woon Tien Wei as the internet art collective tsunamii.net, presenting the work alpha 3.4 (2002). After several years of hosting large-scale exhibitions such as the Singapore Art Show, the Nokia Singapore Art series, and SENI Singapore in 2004, Singapore launched the inaugural Singapore Biennale in 2006.

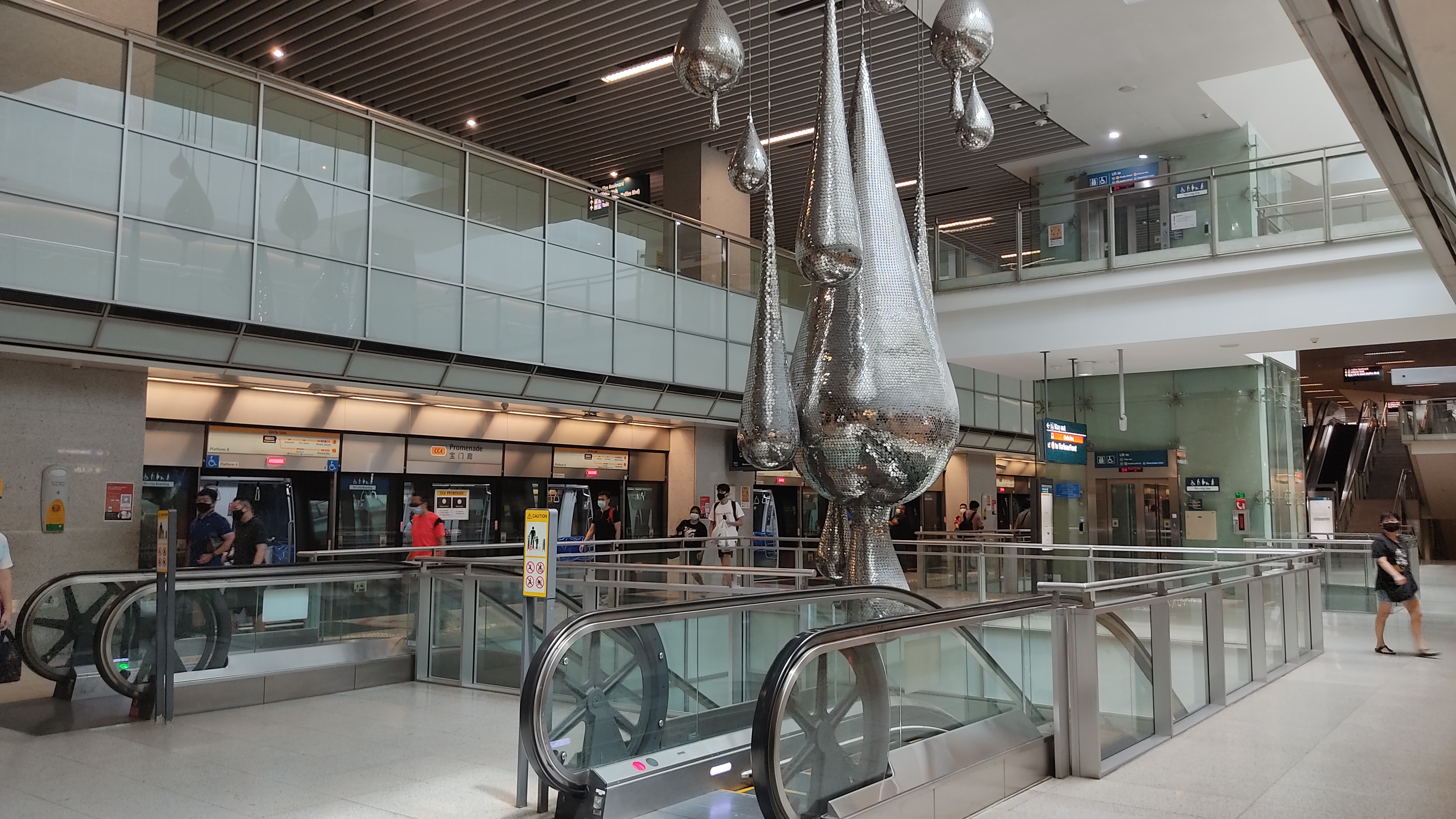
PHUNK, Dreams in Social Cosmic Odyssey, 2010, Promenade MRT station in Singapore

In 2003, the "Art in Transit" (AiT) initiative was established by the Land Transport Authority (LTA) in tandem with the completion of the North East Line (NEL) on the country's Mass Rapid Transit (MRT) system. The initiative gave MRT stations specially commissioned permanent artworks by Singaporean artists in a wide variety of art styles and mediums, including sculptures, murals, and mosaics often integrated into the stations' interior architecture. With over 300 art pieces across 80 stations, it is Singapore's largest public art programme.

In 2009, Ming Wong was the first Singaporean to receive an award at the Venice Biennale, receiving the Special Mention (Expanding Worlds) during the Biennale's Opening Ceremony for his work Life of Imitation. The NTU Centre for Contemporary Art Singapore opened in 2013 with Ute Meta Bauer as founding director, and the National Gallery Singapore opened in 2015. Singaporean art continues in its circulation, with artists such as Ho Tzu Nyen and Shubigi Rao making appearances on the 2019 edition of the ArtReview Power 100 list, which charts the most influential individuals working in contemporary art.
