= Lin Ziping =

Lin Ziping (林子平) is a human name, may refer to:

- Hayashi Shihei (1738-1793), Japanese military scholar
- Lim Tze Peng (born 1921), Singaporean artist
