= Charles Andrew Dyce =

Scottish-Singaporean artist (1816–1853)

Charles Andrew Dyce (1816–1853) was born in St Nicholas, Aberdeen, Scotland to parents William Dyce and Margaret Chalmers who were married on 8 Feb 1798. Charles is also the younger brother of William Dyce (1806–1864), a renowned Scottish artist and a Royal Academician.

He arrived in Singapore from India in 1842 and was a merchant. In his stay in Singapore, Charles took on positions as First Secretary of the Singapore Sporting Club, an amateur thespian and, in 1847, High Sheriff for the Straits Settlements of Singapore, Malacca and Penang. He met and married Eliza Hyde in 1845 in Singapore and had a son. They left for Calcutta together with him.

Charles also produced many sepia and watercolor paintings of scenes and landscapes in the Southeast Asian region. These works of art now form The Charles Dyce Collection found in the South & Southeast Asian Gallery of the National University of Singapore (NUS) Museum.

== Bibliography ==
=== Papers ===
- Widodo, Johannes (2004), Charles Andrew Dyce in Indonesia (1845) - The Journey through Riau to Batavia and through the old Great Western Road to Buitenzorg

in Lim, Irene (2004). Sketching the Straits: a compilation of the lecture series of Charles Dyce collection. Singapore: NUS Museums, National University of Singapore. pp. 63–67. ISBN 981-05-1328-3.

=== Books ===
- Lim, Irene (2003). Sketches in the Straits: nineteenth-century water colours and manuscript of Singapore, Malacca, Penang and Batavia by Charles Dyce. Singapore: NUS Museums, National University of Singapore. ISBN 978-981-4068-92-5.
- Lim, Irene (2004). Sketching the Straits: a compilation of the lecture series of Charles Dyce collection. Singapore: NUS Museums, National University of Singapore. ISBN 981-05-1328-3.
