= Susie Lingham =

Singaporean contemporary artist and educator

- Born: 1965 (age 60–61); Singapore
- Education: Diploma in Fine Art (Nanyang Academy of Fine Arts, 1990); MFA (University of Western Sydney, 2000); PgD (National Institute of Education, 2001); PhD (University of Sussex, 2008)
- Movement: Contemporary art

Susie Lingham (born 1965) is a Singaporean contemporary artist, writer, curator, art theorist, and educator. Her practice often incorporates writing, sound, performance, and installation, synthesising interdisciplinary ideas related to the nature of the mind across different fields, from the humanities to the sciences.

From 1991 to 1994, Lingham was the co-founder and co-artistic director of the Singaporean artist-run initiative and space, 5th Passage, alongside artist Suzann Victor. In August 2013, Lingham was appointed as the Director of the Singapore Art Museum, becoming the institution's third Director and the first woman to helm the role since its opening in 1996. She would step down from the position in March 2016, moving on to take the role of Creative Director for the 5th Singapore Biennale in 2016.

She is a Senior Lecturer at the School of Technology for the Arts, Republic Polytechnic, Singapore.

== Education and personal life ==
Lingham was born in 1965 to a Peranakan Indian father and a Punjabi mother, the youngest of the five children. Lingham would decide on an education in art over literature, obtaining her Diploma in Fine Art from the Nanyang Academy of Fine Arts in 1990, graduating with the Merit Award for outstanding performance. Lingham then pursued a master's in writing at the University of Western Sydney from 1996 to 2000, also obtaining a postgraduate diploma in teaching higher education in 2001 from the National Institute of Education, Singapore. She later pursued a doctor of philosophy in literature, religion and philosophy at the University of Sussex in the United Kingdom from 2004 to 2008.

== Career ==
=== Early artistic career (1990s) ===
From 1991 to 1994, Lingham and fellow artist Suzann Victor served as co-founders and co-artistic directors of 5th Passage. From 1991 to 1994, 5th Passage was based at Parkway Parade shopping centre, and would support performance art, installation, music, photography, and design, also organising public readings and forums. In particular, 5th Passage focussed on issues of gender and identity, and on the work of women artists.

After sensationalised news reporting of Brother Cane, Josef Ng's performance artwork staged at 5th Passage in 1994, the collective was evicted from Parkway Parade. Later in 1994, 5th Passage received a ten-month offer to curate shows at vacant shop units in the Pacific Plaza shopping centre, which the initiative took up. Lingham would also design the set for the Eleanor Wong play Wills And Secession, which was staged by TheatreWorks in 1995. Around a year after 5th Passage's programmes at Pacific Plaza, the founder-directors of the initiative left for further studies and the group disbanded, with Lingham leaving for Australia.

=== Solo artistic career (2000s) ===
From 1999 to 2003, Lingham would work as an arts lecturer at LASALLE College of the Arts, Singapore, and from 2008 to 2009, a senior lecturer at the Nanyang Academy of Fine Arts, Singapore. In 2001, Lingham would develop How to construct a valve on intensity? for The Necessary Stage, a performance production and sound work that sought to create "a 'listening space' [where] 'visuals' will be kept to a minimum." For Nokia Singapore Art 2002, Susie Lingham would perform Borders at the Singapore Art Museum, using images to explore the delineation between physical fact and idealised, nostalgic fiction, further investigating how artistic works blur the boundaries between private and public space. In 2002 she also wrote an equation of vulnerability, a book produced in collaboration with Suzann Victor, published by the former Contemporary Asian Arts Centre, Singapore.

In 2004, Lingham developed an interdisciplinary production, consisting of two parts: the performance If the Universe, between Circle and Ellipse, Slips and the sound and visual exhibition Sounds Like Mirrors. The production featured a violet-hued hall of mirrors with soundscapes, a “staircase creature”, and a pair of illuminated talking heads in dialogue with two bodies in orbit around each other. If the Universe, Between Circle and Ellipse, Slips (2004/13) examined the geometrics of the parabola and ellipse, functioning as a poetic comment on the reciprocal relationship between comprehension and creation. It was later presented as a text piece in the 2013 exhibition at The Substation, The Artist, the Book and the Crowd, curated by Ho Rui An, Ang Siew Ching, and Karen Yeh.

Her first solo show, Turn, held in 2012 at The Substation, featured installations, drawings and poem-riddles on glass bottles.

=== Museum directorship (2010s) ===
In August 2013, Lingham was appointed as the Director of the Singapore Art Museum (SAM), the third Director since its opening in 1996. Prior to her appointment, she was an assistant professor at the Visual and Performing Arts academic group at the National Institute of Education, Singapore. During her time as Director, she oversaw the 4th Singapore Biennale in 2013 and the corporatisation of the museum from November 2013, with the museum leaving the fold of the National Heritage Board to become an independent, non-profit company with an interest in promoting contemporary Southeast Asian art to the public. During her time in the role, she curated exhibitions such as After Utopia: Revisiting the Ideal in Asian Contemporary Art (2015) and 5 Stars: Art Reflects on Peace, Justice, Equality, Democracy and Progress (2015/16).

Lingham later stepped down as Director in March 2016, taking on the role of Creative Director for the 5th Singapore Biennale, An Atlas of Mirrors, in 2016.

=== Continued artistic career (2020s) ===
In 2021, 5th Passage: In Search of Lost Time was presented at Gajah Gallery, Singapore, an exhibition that brought together artists who had previously shown works with 5th Passage, including works from Lingham and Victor. The exhibition sought to revive a consciousness of the various activities, ideals, and aspirations of 5th Passage.

At the Gajah Gallery in 2022, Lingham held a solo exhibition titled Thought Sample Return, presenting a series of "conceptual sculptures" exploring reasoning and consciousness in the human mind.

== Art ==
=== Turn (2012) ===
For her solo show at The Substation, Lingham examined the kinetic aspect of words and their potential as ideas, a 'brink' or 'turning point' that was explored via book art, paper works, glass sculptures, and diorama installations, many using poetic texts, numerology, associative wordplay, and inkblot imagery. A limited edition book, An Unkempt Metaphysical Alphabet and a Pseudorandom Pataphysical Alphabet, had its pages displayed as a series of 26 Rorsarch inkblot-like formations that extend into pairs of words that interrogated each other, such as "Knot/Karma" and "Formlessness/Freedom." Inkblots were likewise seen in 64 Shifts, comprising circular pieces of paper stuck on the wall, curling like a tendril even as its individual pieces seemingly fold into itself. The exhibition opened with elsewhere|erehwsele, a performance work featuring sound and poetry, choreographed movement, and vocals.
