= Jules Itier =

French photographer (1802–1877)

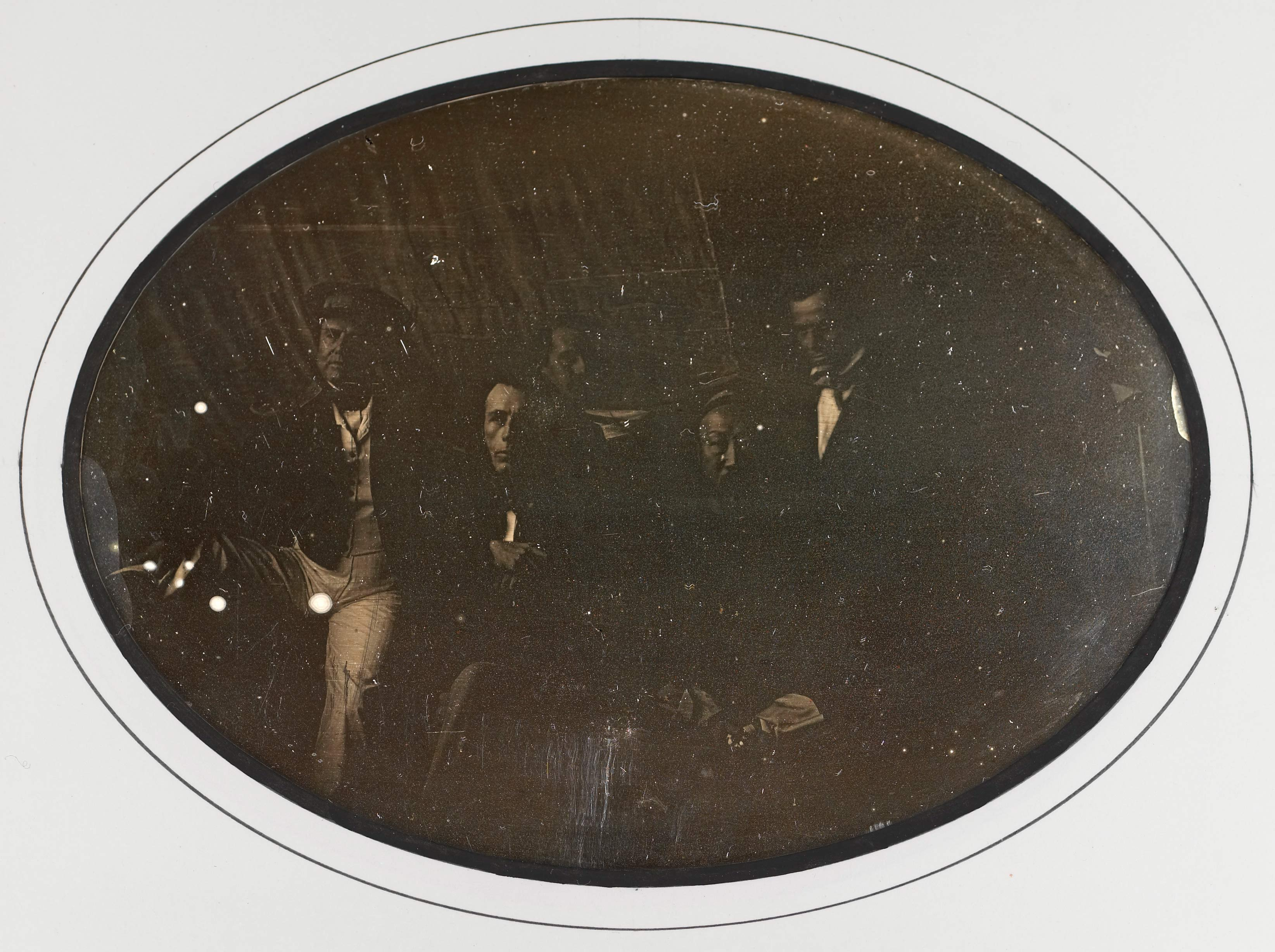
Signatories of the Whampoa Treaty with Lagrené and Qiying in the center, 1844

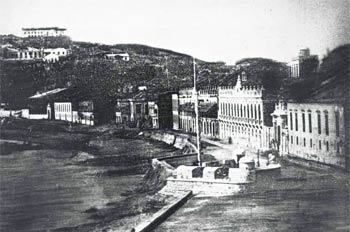
Daguerreotype of Macao, taken by Itier in 1844

Jules Alphonse Eugène Itier (French pronunciation: [ʒyl alfɔ̃s øʒɛn itje]; 1802–1877) was a French customs inspector and amateur daguerreotypist. Between 1842 and 1843 he traveled to Senegal, Guadeloupe and India, where he took a number of early daguerreotypes.

In December 1843, Itier was sent to accompany Théodore de Lagrené on his journey to China, where he had been dispatched by Louis Philippe to conclude a commercial treaty. In China, Itier documented the conclusion of the Treaty of Whampoa and took a number of daguerreotypes of Chinese people and scenery in the Guangdong region. Although the daguerreotype reportedly reached China in the later stages of the First Opium War, Itier's daguerreotypes are the earliest preserved photographs of China. Upon his return to France, Itier wrote an extensive travelogue of his journey to China.
