= Salleh Japar =

Singaporean contemporary artist

- Born: 1962 (age 63–64); Singapore
- Education: Diploma in Fine Art (Nanyang Academy of Fine Arts, 1986); BFA (Curtin University of Technology, 1990); PgD (University of Central England, 1996) RMIT University (Masters in Arts by research)
- Known for: Installation art, sculpture, painting
- Movement: Contemporary art
- Awards: 1996: Visual Arts Award, Japanese Chamber of Commerce & Industry; 1999: Singapore Youth Award (Arts & Culture), National Youth Council

Salleh Japar (born 1962) is a Singaporean contemporary artist working across sculpture, installation and painting, with his work coming into prominence in late 1980s Singapore. Within Singapore's history of contemporary art, Salleh is known for his collective work with Goh Ee Choo and S. Chandrasekaran for the seminal 1988 exhibition, Trimurti. In 2001, Salleh was one of four artists selected to represent at the very first Singapore Pavilion at the prestigious 49th Venice Biennale, alongside artists Henri Chen KeZhan, Suzann Victor, and Matthew Ngui.

Salleh's practice explores the confluence of ideas surrounding identity and tradition in postmodern contexts of art making, with his current research locating and interpreting Southeast Asian aesthetics, with an emphasis on Nusantara or the Malay world and its symbolic, structural readings of space and the technologies of craft.

== Education and personal life ==
Salleh graduated from the Nanyang Academy of Fine Arts, Singapore, with a Diploma in Fine Arts in 1986, later obtaining his Bachelor of Fine Arts with Distinction from the Curtin University of Technology, Western Australia, in 1990. From 1990 to 1995, Salleh was a lecturer at the Nanyang Academy of Fine Arts, later pursuing a postgraduate diploma in Art Education at the University of Central England, United Kingdom, graduating in 1996.

Salleh was an appointed member on Course Validation as well as on the Overseas Student Council at Nanyang Academy of Fine Arts. He has also worked as an assistant curator of art at the National Museum of Singapore. Currently, Salleh is a senior lecturer and programme leader for undergraduate studies at LASALLE College of the Arts.

== Career ==
=== 1980s ===
In March 1988, Salleh, alongside fellow Nanyang Academy of Fine Arts graduates Goh Ee Choo and S. Chandrasekaran, launched the exhibition titled Trimurti at the Goethe-Institut, Singapore, staging works from paintings to performances at the exhibition site. Trimurti has been critically regarded as a highly significant exhibition in the history of Singapore's contemporary art for its disruption of curatorial convention at the time in 1980s Singapore, as well as its exploration of a possible aesthetics for 'multiculturalism' in Singapore.

=== 1990s ===
During the 1990s, Salleh exhibited locally and internationally at sites such as at 5th Passage (1992) in Singapore for the Hope and Heal Project, the Taipei Fine Arts Museum (1993) in Taiwan for Four Asian Artists, the 7th Bangladesh Biennale(1995), at The Substation, Singapore, in 1997 for Art 35: APAD 35th Anniversary Exhibition, as well as presenting Cultural Sinkholes at the Nokia Singapore Art biennial exhibition in 1999. In 1998, a retrospective of Trimurti, titled Trimurti and Ten Years After, was held at the Singapore Art Museum, commemorating a decade since the original exhibition.

=== 2000s ===
In 2001, Salleh was selected to represent at the very first Singapore Pavilion at the 49th Venice Biennale. Curated by Ahmad Mashadi and Joanna Lee, Salleh would exhibit alongside Henri Chen KeZhan, Suzann Victor, and Matthew Ngui. At the Singapore Pavilion, Salleh presented a large-scale installation, Kemelut (Turbulence). In 2004, Salleh presented a solo exhibition, Gurindam dan Igauan, at the Earl Lu Gallery, Singapore, and in 2008, he exhibited work at APAD: Tradition, Innovation and Continuity at the Singapore Art Museum. In 2005, Salleh would draw on his earlier experiences as Assistant Curator at the National Museum Singapore to curate an exhibition titled Batik Forms: Rethinking Tradition at the MICA ARTrium.

=== 2010s to present ===
After a 10-year hiatus, Salleh would present new work at a solo exhibition in 2015, Talwin and Tamkin, at the Institute of Contemporary Arts Singapore. In 2018, Salleh would exhibit Sulh-i-Kull (Universal Tolerance) at State of Motion: Sejarah-ku, an artwork of nine stone-like tablets responding to the location as an imagined site for the early arrival of Islam to the Malay Archipelago, in reference to the 1960 film, Isi Neraka.

== Art ==
=== Trimurti (1988) ===
Refusing to take part in their own graduation show, Salleh, alongside fellow Nanyang Academy of Fine Arts graduates Goh and Chandrasekaran, instead staged works such as paintings, installations and performances at their own exhibition at Goethe-Institut, titled Trimurti. The trio treated the gallery as a collaborative space, creating an exhibition that could be viewed as a single large installation, rather than a curated selection of individual works.

Taking the Hindu concept of trimurti as its starting point, that is, creation, preservation and destruction, the trio sought to develop an artistic language inspired by Indian-Hindi, Chinese-Buddhist, and Malay-Muslim vernacular traditions and cultural values, for Chandrasekaran, Goh, and Salleh, respectively. Despite the close alignment with state-prescribed notions of preserving distinct racial, ethnic, and religious identities under the CMIO (Chinese-Malay-Indian-Other) system of categorisation, such artistic explorations were deemed significant as an early attempt to contend with multiculturalism in Singaporean identity and culture in contemporary art.

=== 49th Venice Biennale (2001) ===
At the Singapore Pavilion, Salleh presented Kemelut (Turbulence), an installation made with metal sheets, PVC pipes, brass tap heads, wood, unbleached calico, and an assortment of spices and salt. Consisting of three sequential and experiential spaces, visitors first encountered a large metal-clad wall connecting the two other spaces. The first space was dominated by the presence and smell of spices, and the second, by salt. For Salleh, these material encounters provided a metaphor for engagements between colonial powers and the colonised. Through references to the history of Venetian and European trade, as well as Western colonialism in Asia, Salleh sought to critique the West's construction of its own history and identity by identifying marginalised fragments, forgotten texts, materials and experiences that could complicate static and stable notions of history.

== Awards ==
In 1996, Salleh received the Visual Arts Award from the Japanese Chamber of Commerce & Industry, and in 1999, he was awarded the Singapore Youth Award (Art and Culture) from the National Youth Council. In 2008, he was one of 28 artists commissioned by Singapore's Land Transport Authority to create artwork for the Paya Lebar MRT station. One of the highest accolades he has received is being selected as one of the four artists representing Singapore in the 49th Venice Biennale in 2001.
