= Suzann Victor =

Singaporean contemporary artist

- Suzann Victor performing Still Waters (between estrangement and reconciliation) in 1998
- Born: 1959 (age 66–67); Singapore
- Education: Associate Diploma in Fine Art, Painting (LASALLE College of the Arts, 1990); BFA (University of Western Sydney, 1997); MFA (University of Western Sydney, 2000); PhD (University of Western Sydney, 2008)
- Known for: Installation art, performance art, painting
- Movement: Contemporary art
- Website: https://www.suzannvictor.com/

Suzann Victor (born 1959) is a Singaporean contemporary artist based in Australia whose practice spans installation, painting, and performance art. Victor is most known for her public artworks and installations that examine ideas of disembodiment, the postcolonial, and the environmental in response to space, context and architecture.

Victor was the co-founder and artistic director of the significant Singaporean artist-run initiative and space, 5th Passage (1991-1994). She was one of four artists selected to exhibit at Singapore's first national pavilion at the 49th Venice Biennale in 2001, alongside Henri Chen KeZhan, Salleh Japar, and Matthew Ngui. She was the only woman artist to have represented at the Singapore Pavilion for the art biennale in Venice until 2022, with Shubigi Rao to represent Singapore then.

She has exhibited widely on the international circuit, participating in exhibitions such as the 6th Havana Biennale in Cuba, The 2nd Asia-Pacific Triennial (APT2) in Australia, the 6th Gwangju Biennale in South Korea, the 5th Seoul International Media Art Biennale in South Korea, ZKM's Thermocline of Art 2007 in Germany, and OÖ Kulturquartier's Hohenrausch 2014 in Austria.

== Education and personal life ==
Born the youngest of more than 10 children, Victor was adopted by the second wife of her biological aunt's husband. Her adoptive mother was a housewife and her adoptive father, who had five other children, ran a transport business. Victor knew little about her biological father, though she was aware that he painted movie banners, and her biological mother was a housewife. In the 1970s, after completing her GCE 'O' Levels at Fairfield Methodist Girls' School, Victor searched for a job and enrolled in a secretarial course, though she did not get the opportunity to apply her skills. At the age of 19, she became a housewife, marrying her now ex-husband. 7 years later at the age of 26, she enrolled at LASALLE College of the Arts while still married.

In 1990, Victor graduated with an Associate Diploma of Fine Art (Painting) from LASALLE College of the Arts. She would leave Singapore in the mid-1990s to study in Australia, obtaining her Bachelor of Fine Arts in 1997, her Master of Fine Arts in 2000, and be awarded her Doctor of Philosophy in 2008, all from the University of Western Sydney (now known as Western Sydney University).

== Career ==
=== Early career ===
In 1988, Victor and her LASALLE College of the Arts classmates took over a stretch of Orchard Road with their abstract prints and paintings, holding a small exhibition by displaying their work on the ground. A stranger who walked by their roadside exhibition, who then owned a picture-frame shop in Orchard Point, was taken by the students' works and sponsored a proper show in the shopping centre. The exhibition attracted so much attention that its run was extended, with all works sold.

=== 5th Passage and after ===
Following her graduation from art school in 1990, Victor approached the management of Parkway Parade shopping centre in 1991 to enquire about a space to display art, and was offered a two-year, rent-free lease for a fifth-floor passageway which she proposed to turn into a contemporary art space. From 1991 to 1994, 5th Passage would support performance art, installation, music, photography, and design, also organising public readings and forums. In particular, it focussed on issues of gender and identity, and on the work of women artists. Victor and fellow artist Susie Lingham would serve as co-founders and co-artistic directors of the space.

During the final days of 1993, 5th Passage held the Artists' General Assembly (AGA) festival at their Parkway Parade space, co-organising the event with The Artists Village. Here, Josef Ng's Brother Cane performance work was staged and sensationalised in local newspapers as an obscene act. Following the public outcry, 5th Passage was charged with breaching the conditions of its Public Entertainment License, blacklisted from funding by Singapore's National Arts Council, and evicted from its Parkway Parade site. Described as one of the "darkest moments of Singapore’s contemporary art scene", the incident led to a ten-year no-funding rule for performance art, a ruling lifted only in 2003.

Later in 1994, 5th Passage received a ten-month offer to curate shows at vacant shop units in the Pacific Plaza shopping centre, which the initiative took up. Here, Victor produced a series of performative installations that grieved for the silencing of 5th Passage and all Singapore artists. Victor's works from this series, such as His Mother is a Theatre and Expense of Spirit in a Waste of Shame were acquired by the Singapore Art Museum as soon as it was shown, becoming significant works within Singapore's history of contemporary art. Around a year after 5th Passage's programmes at Pacific Plaza, the founder-directors of the initiative left for further studies and the group disbanded, with Victor leaving for Australia.

In 1998, Victor performed Still Waters (between estrangement and reconciliation) at the Singapore Art Museum for exhibition and residency project, ARX5: Processes. It was an uncommon publicly staged performance work between 1994 and 2003, described by Victor as a work responding to the de facto performance art ban and the loss of the 5th Passage space.

In 2001, Victor was selected as one of four artists to exhibit at Singapore's first national pavilion at the 49th Venice Biennale, the first and only woman artist to have represented at the Singapore Pavilion for the art biennale in Venice until 2022, when Shubigi Rao was selected to represent Singapore.

=== Present-day ===
In 2013, for the 4th Singapore Biennale, Victor exhibited Rainbow Circle: Capturing a Natural Phenomenon, which induced rainbows within the interior of the National Museum of Singapore.

In 2019, the M1 Singapore Fringe Festival selected "Still Waters" as its theme, a direct reference to the 1998 performance work at the Singapore Art Museum by Victor.

== Art ==
Victor's installations are often theatrical in nature, and of a scale that allows the viewer to 'enter' the work, such as in her 1994 works His Mother is a Theatre and Expense of Spirit in a Waste of Shame. Such works are highly performative in nature, often utilising kinetic and aural elements. Issues of gender, marginalisation, and abjection are significant themes explored—in her 1998 performance work, Still Waters (between estrangement and reconciliation), Victor performed within the drains of the Singapore Art Museum, the role of which Victor explores in her doctorate thesis, Abjection: Weapon of the Weak, writing:

Drains operate as a visible sign of the abject, discouraging any form of proximity by the stench they produce. As metaphorical repositories for society’s overflowing 'unconscious', these longkangs (Malay for drains) collect, siphon and direct the abject, the polluting, expired, decaying or the 'useless', into watery depths—the sea around the island. But the abject, like the unconscious, has a persistent way of imposing itself upon us. The very ubiquity of drains are a reminder of the impossibility of disappearance, the futility of evasion.

Such drains were a relic of the building's colonial architecture, made purposeless by retrofitted glass walls that turned a once-exposed balcony on the second-floor into a sealed, controlled air-conditioned space for artworks. The position of the artist's body within this liminal space, half-submerged in drain water, spoke to the role of performance art with its de facto ban in Singapore; the spectre of coloniality upon the postcolonial body; as well as the marginalised presence of women artists in the male-dominated art landscape of the time.

== Awards and collections ==
In 1988, Victor was awarded the Australian Bicentennial "Highly Commended Award" from the National Museum of Singapore. Later in 1989, she received the IBM Merit Prize from Singapore's Ministry of Communications and Information. In 1995, Victor was awarded the Singapore International Foundation Art Award.

Her work can be found in the collections of the Singapore Art Museum, the Australian High Commission in Singapore, the University of Western Sydney in Australia, the Singapore Armed Forces Reservist Association, the Ministry of Information and the Arts in Singapore, the Takahasi Corporation in Japan and Ernst & Young, among others.
