= Heinrich Leutemann =

German artist and illustrator (1824–1905)

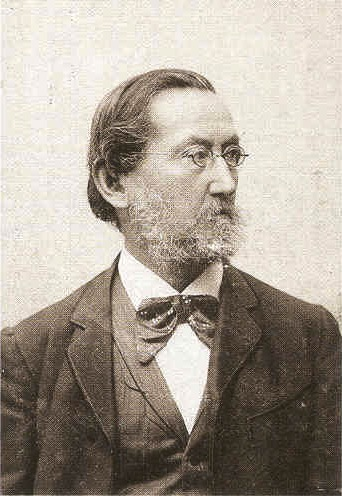
Heinrich Leutemann, c. 1880

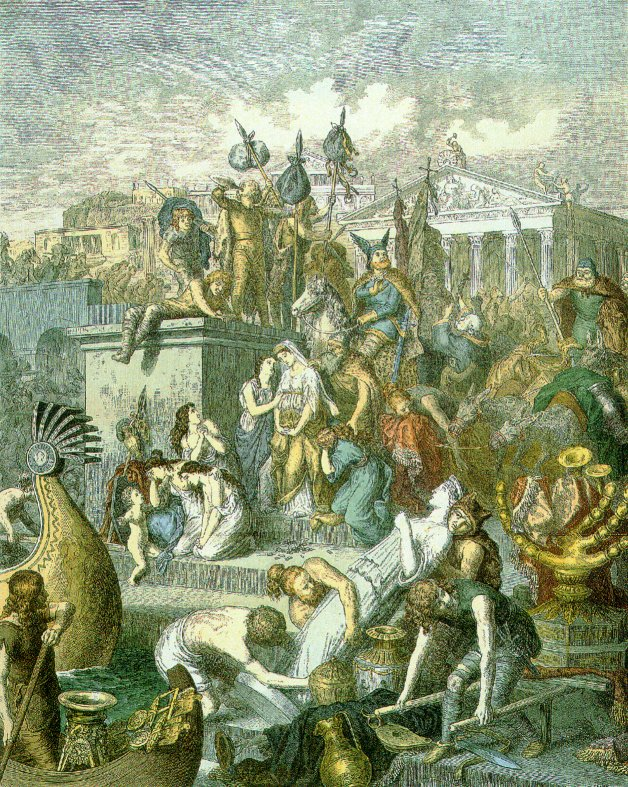
The Vandals sacking Rome, by Leutemann

Gottlob Heinrich (Henrik) Leutemann (8 October 1824 — 14 December 1905) was a German artist and book illustrator. He was born in Leipzig and studied there.

He produced lithographs for instructional posters. In the 1850s, he worked on pictures of animals for a zoological Atlas. Some of his drawings include Ankunft Junger Leoparden bei Hagenbeck in Hamburg ("A box of young leopards arrives at Hagenbeck's Animal Show in Hamburg"), Tierkauf in Afrika ("Buying animals in Africa"), Riesenschlangen-Käfig im Zoologischen Garten Hamburg (Giant snakes' cage in the Hamburg Zoo), and Manatees ("Manatees"). Hagenbeck's Tierpark still brings visitors to Hamburg.

With a professor named A. Kirchoff, who wrote the text, Leutemann produced Graphic Pictures of Native Life in Distant Lands, illustrating the Typical Races of Mankind (1888). This was meant to be an ethnographic study for older children, and the book described and illustrated indigenous peoples of the world: the Aborigines of Australia, the Papuans, the Polynesians, the Eskimos, the American Indians, the Hottentots, the Negros, the Nubians, the Arabs, the Indians, the Chinese, and the Japanese.

He also worked with classical themes; his drawings include Battle of the Amazons, the Acropolis at Athens, and The astronomer Ptolemy putting up a stone, on the authority of the Aristotle commentator Olympiodorus (6th century), tablet in the Temple of Serapis in Canobus commemorating his major astronomical achievements (1876).

He died at Chemnitz-Wittgensdor.
