= Lim Tze Peng =

Singaporean artist (1921–2025)

- 林子平
- Lim in 2008
- Born: 28 September 1921; Singapore, Straits Settlements, British Malaya
- Died: 3 February 2025 (aged 103); Singapore
- Known for: Chinese ink painting
- Awards: 1963: Public Administration Medal (PPA), Singapore; 1977: Special Prize, Commonwealth Art Exhibition, England; 1981: Public Service Medal, Singapore; 2003: Cultural Medallion Award (Art)

Lim Tze Peng (Chinese: 林子平; pinyin: Lín Zǐpíng; Pe̍h-ōe-jī: Lîm Tsí-pîng, 28 September 1921 – 3 February 2025) was a Singaporean artist. He was awarded a Cultural Medallion in 2003 in recognition of his contribution to the country's art and culture. In June 2021, it was reported that he was still producing art at the age of 99.

== Background ==
Lim Tze Peng (Lim Swee Lian) was born on 28 September 1921 in Singapore to a family of pig and chicken farmers in Pasir Ris. He was the eldest of seven children.

Lim studied at Guangyang Primary School and Chung Cheng High School (Main).

In 1949, Lim became a primary school teacher at Xin Min School and then became principal in 1951. He remained as principal till he retired in 1981.

Lim died from pneumonia in Singapore on 3 February 2025, at the age of 103.

== Painting career ==
Lim created art related to the heritage of Singapore.

A self-taught artist, Lim was skilled in Chinese brush and calligraphy. The only formal art training he had was the drawing classes he attended in his school days. Lim started learning how to paint in his twenties and after his retirement, started to paint professionally.

To say Lim Tze Peng loved the Singapore yesteryear is an understatement. He was so passionate about it that he opted for an early retirement from his school principal's job in 1981, in order to spend all his time in recording the passing scene. The Singapore River, Boat Quay, Hock Lim Street, Merchant Road, Smith Street, Trengganu Street, Sago Lane, and Pagoda Street, are depicted in their original state in Lim Tze Peng's paintings.

Painting for Lim Tze Peng meant sketching on the spot with Chinese ink and brush. It was a total experience in that he took in what he saw and felt at a single moment in time, selecting, analyzing, composing, and recording details simultaneously. His handling of tonal values and the swift notations of light and dark complemented the decisive brush strokes to give life and movement to the subject matter. The calligraphic brushwork, rooted in the artist's deep knowledge of Chinese writing, is the most characteristic feature of Lim Tze Peng's work.

In 2003, Lim was awarded the Cultural Medallion and in 2016, he was awarded the Pingat Jasa Gemilang (Meritorious Service Medal).

== Influences ==
Lim scrutinised the masterpieces of the leading Chinese artists in history. He was convinced that the power of their work often resided in one singular aspect which dominated their overall achievements. His observations are revealing: the visual power of Pan Tianshou's (1897–1971) paintings radiates from the massiveness of his expansive forms; that of Qi Baishi's (1863–1957) from his overpowering sensitivity of touch; that of Wu Changshou's (1844–1927) from his intriguing balance of the painterly dynamics in his art.

Works in Chinese art history impressed him, particularly those characterised by a tremendous sense of directness, the orthodox and liberation. He singled out the Ming masters such as Xu Wei (1521–1593) and Qing masters such as Pu Huan (1832–1911), whose dynamic works remain as powerful as they are contemporary today.

== Old Singapore series ==
In 1981, Tze Peng plunged into an uninterrupted marathon race to complete a large number of Singapore scenes which had captured his imagination. This produced 300 ink paintings, covering a range of places which included Teochew Street, Amoy Street, Chinatown, Elgin Bridge, shop houses and sweeping overviews of the Singapore River. The Old Singapore Series became a valuable visual documentation of Singapore’s changing cityscape, during a time when the country’s urban renewal was happening at a hectic pace.

== Artists' residency in Paris ==
In 2000, Lim Tze Peng took up a two-month artists' residency in the Cité Internationale des Arts, occupying an apartment belonging to the Nanyang Academy of Fine Arts (NAFA) in Singapore. His residency resulted in a body of works documenting the Parisian landscape, which included iconic landmarks such as the Eiffel Tower, the Moulin Rouge, the Arc de Triomphe, and Notre Dame Cathedral as well as quintessential Parisian scenes of sidestreets and cafés.

He later donated 45 of these Chinese ink and colour paintings to NAFA.

== Major exhibitions ==
| Dates | Title | Location |
|---|---|---|
| 1970 | 1st Solo Exhibition | Singapore |
| 1977 | Royal Overseas League Exhibition | England |
| 1978 | Singapore Artists Art Exhibition in Moscow | Friendship House, Moscow |
| 1980 | Fifth Festival of Asian Art | Hongkong |
| 1981 | Singapore Calligraphy Exhibition | Singapore |
| 1982 | Seventh International Artists Art Exhibition | Taiwan |
| 1986 | Eighth International Artists Art Exhibition | Taiwan |
| 1987 | Three-man Art Exhibition | Ginza, Tokyo, Japan |
| 1988 | France Salon Exhibition | Palais, France |
| 1989 | New York Art Expo '89 First Bru-Sin Art Exhibition '89 | New York Brunei |
| 1991 | 2nd Solo Exhibition | National Museum Art Gallery; Singapore Tze Peng by Himself, 1993, Singapore Art Fair presented by Gim Ng of Shenn's Fine Art, Singapore |
| 1995 | Moments by Lim Tze Peng (solo) | curated and presented by Gim Ng of Shenn's Fine Art and Takashimaya Gallery; Singapore |
| 1998 | Meeting Places in Fleeting Spaces | Singapore Art Museum; Singapore |
| 2003 | Tze Peng | Singapore Art Museum; Singapore |
| 2021 | Soul of Ink: Lim Tze Peng at 100 Exhibition | The Arts House, Singapore |
| 2023 | Lim Tze Peng Solo Exhibition – From Lion City To London / Start Art Fair | Saatchi Gallery, London; United Kingdom |

== Awards ==
| Dates | Title | Location |
|---|---|---|
| 1963 | National Day Award (PPA) | Singapore |
| 1977 | Special Prize, Commonwealth Art Exhibition | England |
| 1981 | National Day Award (PBM) | Singapore |
| 2003 | Cultural Medallion | Singapore |
| 2016 | Pingat Jasa Gemilang (Meritorious Service Medal) | Singapore |

== Bibliography ==
- Tze Peng, Lim (2007). 林子平:新加坡河的记忆 (Lim Tze Peng: Singapore River memory). Singapore: Cape of Good Hope Gallery.
- Chim Kang, Chua; Bridget Tracy, Tan, eds. (2003). Tze Peng. Singapore: Singapore Art Museum. ISBN 981-05-0094-7.
