= Singapore Women's Hall of Fame =

Hall of fame for Singaporean women

The Singapore Women's Hall of Fame is a virtual hall of fame that honors and documents the lives of historically significant women in Singapore. The hall is the creation of the Singapore Council of Women's Organisations (SCWO), and grew out of an earlier nine-member wall of fame that the organization created in 2005.

== Categories of achievement ==
The Hall recognizes women in thirteen categories of achievement:

- adventurers and explorers
- advocacy and activism
- arts/culture/entertainment
- business and enterprise
- community/social work
- education
- environment/conservation
- health
- government
- law
- science/technology
- sports
- uniformed professions

== History ==
The hall of fame was launched on 14 March 2014, with 108 initial inductees. A five-person selection committee headed by Ambassador Tommy Koh selected the initial inductees from over 200 nominees; the committee took over a year to make its selections. President of Singapore Tony Tan and his wife Mary Tan – a patron of the Singapore Council of Women's Organisations – were the guests of honor at the launch, and presented some of the awards to the recipients at the launch gala. Eleven additional women were inducted in 2015, in a ceremony on International Women's Day. The Speaker of Parliament, Halimah Yacob, presented the awards to the honorees. That month The Fullerton Hotel Singapore held a photo exhibition in partnership with the Singapore Women's Hall of Fame that highlighted 108 of the inductees.

The Singapore Women's Hall of Fame accepts nominations from the public for future inductees, and people can be inducted into the Singapore Women's Hall of Fame posthumously.

== Inductees ==
Key

2014 *	Member of the original Wall of Fame

Singapore Women's Hall of Fame
Name	Birth–Death	Year	Category	Area of achievement
Adelene Wee	(1965–)	2014	Sports	At age 19 she became the nation's first and the world's youngest World Bowling Champion, winning the title at the 1985 World Games.
Aisha Akbar	(1930–2015)	2017	Arts/Culture/Entertainment/Media	Music teacher, songwriter, author and broadcaster. Collected Malay folk songs.
Aline Wong	(1941–)	2014	Government	A sociologist and Member of Parliament, as Minister of Education, she promoted early childhood, special needs, arts education programs, and introduced sex education to the national curriculum.
Agnes Fong Sock Har	(1946–)	2014	Uniformed professions	She became the female commanding officer in the Singapore Armed Forces when, as a captain, she was given command of the 1st Air Supply Base.
Agnes Joaquim	(1854–1899)	2015	Environment/conservation	She was a horticulturalist who bred the first hybrid orchid, the Vanda 'Miss Joaquim', which is now the national flower of Singapore.
Anamah Tan	(1940–)	2014	Advocacy & activism	She was a co-founder of the Singapore Association of Women Lawyers, advocate against gender discrimination and domestic abuse, and member of the United Nations Committee on the Elimination of Discrimination against Women.
Alice Pennefather	(1903–1983)	2016	Sports	Singapore’s first women’s singles badminton champion.
Annabel Pennefather	(1948–2020)	2021	Sports	Trailblazing sports administrator and lawyer. National hockey player, first woman in executive committee of the Singapore National Olympic Council (SNOC) in 1999, and subsequently SNOC vice-president in 2006, first woman president of the Singapore Hockey Federation in 2004, first woman as Chef de Mission at sports.
Anastasia Tjendri-Liew	(1947–)	2018	Business & enterprise	Founder of one of the most successful bakery chains in Singapore.
Ang Swee Chai	(1948–)	2016	Health	An orthopedic surgeon who co-found the charity Medical Aid for Palestinians.
Anita Sarawak	(1952–)	2017	Arts/culture/entertainment/media	Internationally renowned singer.
Ann Elizabeth Wee	(1926–2019)	2014	Community/social work	Considered the "founding mother of social work in Singapore", she worked with the abused and abandoned before joining the staff of the then-University of Malaya and pushing for the development of a four-year degree program to train social workers.
Anne Lee Tzu Pheng	(1946–)	2014	Arts/culture/entertainment	A world-renowned poet and recipient of the Cultural Medallion for Literature, she composed the official song of Singapore's National Day in 1998.
Anastasia Gan	(1958–)	2014	Uniformed professions	After two decades with the Republic of Singapore Air Force, she became the nation's first female commercial pilot when she joined SilkAir.
Aziza Ali	(1950–)	2016	Arts/culture/entertainment/media	Restaurateur, Malay chef and writer.
Bridget Tan	(1948–2022)	2015	Advocacy & activism	An advocate for migrant worker rights and against human trafficking, she founded the Archdiocesan Commission for the Pastoral Care of Migrants and Itinerant People (ACMI) in 1998 and the Humanitarian Organization for Migration Economics (HOME) in 2004.
Catherine Lim	(1942–)	2014	Arts/culture/entertainment	A bestselling author and self-described feminist, she is best known for her works of romantic historical fiction, which feature strong female characters.
Checha Davies	(1898–1979)	2014	Advocacy & activism	A women's rights advocate, she served as a spokesperson for the Singapore Council of Women, was a two-time president of the area Young Women's Christian Association, and founded two social organizations, the Indian-Ceylonese Club and the Singapore Inner Wheel Club.
Chua Jim Neo	(1905–1980)	2015	Arts/culture/entertainment	She wrote what is considered the most authoritative cookbook on Peranakan cuisine, Mrs Lee's Cookbook, and is the mother of Singapore's first Prime Minister, Lee Kuan Yew.
Chan Choy Siong	(1931–1981)	2014 *	Advocacy & activism	A member of the Legislative Assembly, the precursor to Singapore's Parliament, she organized efforts within the People's Action Party to push for women's rights.
Chee Swee Lee	(1955–)	2014	Sports	A sprinter, she won medals at the SEAP games in 1969, 1971, and 1973, before becoming the first woman from Singapore to win a gold medal at the Asian Games in the 1974 games.
Chua Sock Koong	(1957–)	2014	Business & enterprise	The Chief Executive Officer of Singapore Telecommunications Limited (SingTel), she is ranked among Forbes' Most Powerful Woman Leaders in Business list.
Chan Heng Chee	(1942–)	2014	Government	One of the longest serving and most successful diplomats in Singaporean history, she was the nation's first permanent representative to the United Nations and served as the Ambassador of Singapore to the United States from 1996 to 2012.
Cheong Koon Hean	(1957–)	2014	Government	As the head of the Urban Redevelopment Authority, she oversaw the planning of the iconic Marina Bay district, before going on to lead the Housing Development Board.
Claire Chiang	(1951–)	2018	Business & enterprise	Noted for her work in corporate responsibility.
Constance Goh	(1906–1996)	2014	Advocacy & activism	An international leader in family planning and reproductive rights, she was the first chairperson of the Singapore Family Planning Association and co-founded the International Planned Parenthood Federation.
Charlotte Elizabeth Ferguson-Davie	(1880–1943)	2014	Health	She founded St. Andrew's Mission Hospital and oversaw some of Singapore's first programs to train female midwives and nurses.
Chng Seok Tin	(1946–2019)	2014	Arts/culture/entertainment	A visually impaired sculptor and artist, she became the first person from Singapore to exhibit her works at the Headquarters of the United Nations, and is a recipient of the Cultural Medallion.
Constance Mary Turnbull	(1927–2008)	2014	Education	Then the head of the History department at the University of Hong Kong, she documented Singapore's history and independence movement in A History of Singapore, 1819-1975.
Constance Singam	(1936–)	2015	Advocacy & activism	An activist for women's rights, migrant worker rights, and rape victims, she served as the president of Association of Women for Action and Research (AWARE) over three non-contiguous periods, and as president of the Singapore Council of Women's Organisations (SCWO) for two years.
Che Zahara binte Noor Mohamed	(1907–1962)	2014	Advocacy & activism	She founded the first Muslim women's organization in Singapore, the Malay Women's Welfare Association, and was instrumental in the passage of the Women's Charter, a women's rights act.
Christina Ong	(1947–)	2014	Business & enterprise	An international fashion and hotel entrepreneur, she is the owner of the Club 21 boutique chain, serves as director of Singapore Airlines, and is the chair of the National Parks Board.
Cynthia Goh	(1949–2022)	2014	Health	She pioneered and advocated for hospice and palliative care in Singapore, and serves on the boards of several organizations and associations that advance palliative care.
Daisy Devan	(1928–2009)	2018	Business & enterprise	First Asian person working as the leader of a record label in Southeast Asia.
Daisy Vaithilingam	(1925–2014)	2014	Community/social work	A medical social worker, she created first foster care plan for children in her country, helped establish the Singapore Association of Social Workers, and helped create a medical social work program at National University Hospital.
Ding Jeak Ling	(1956–)	2022	Science/Technology	Pioneering researcher in biochemistry.
Eleanor Clunies-Ross	(1934–)	2016	Sports	Pioneering sprint champion.
Elizabeth Choy	(1910–2006)	2014 *	Advocacy & activism	In recognition of her work smuggling supplies to British prisoners of war during the Japanese occupation of Singapore, she was awarded the Order of the British Empire. She went on to serve as the only female member of the Legislative Council in the body's brief history.
Ellice Handy	(1902–1989)	2015	Arts/culture/entertainment	She wrote the first Singaporean cookbook, My Favorite Recipes (1952), in order to raise funds for the Methodist Girls' School, of which she was a lifelong affiliate.
Euleen Goh	(1955–)	2014	Business & enterprise	The head of Standard Chartered Bank's Singapore operations from 2001 to 2006, she has served on the boards of over a dozen corporations and foundations.
Elizabeth Sam	(1939–2023)	2014	Government	As an administrator at the Ministry of Finance and the Monetary Authority of Singapore, she was one of the architects of Singapore's rise as a global financial center.
Esther Tan Cheng Yin	(1975–)	2014	Adventurers & explorers	The first woman naval diver in the Singapore Navy, she is also an elite adventure racer and came within 100 meters of scaling Mount Everest.
Evelyn Norris	(1918–2014)	2019	Education	Principal at Raffles Girls' School.
Fang Ai Lian	(1949–)	2014	Business & enterprise	Spending 34 years at Ernst & Young, she became the first woman to head the Singapore office of a multinational financial services firm, and from 2005 to 2008 she was the chair of the organization.
Florence Chua Siew Lian	(1965–)	2019	Uniformed professions	First woman to become a deputy commissioner of the police department in Singapore.
Gan Siow Huang	(1974–)	2019	Uniformed professions	First woman to become a brigadier-general in the Singapore armed forces.
Geh Min	(1950–)	2014	Environment/conservation	An eye surgeon by trade, she is best known for her work as a conservationist, and served as the head of the Nature Society from 2000 to 2008.
Geraldene Lowe-Ismail	(1938–2025)	2018	Arts/culture/media	Tour guide of Singapore for more than 50 years.
Gloria Beck	(1938–2015)	2016	Sports	Pioneer athlete.
Gloria Lim	(1930–2022)	2014	Science/technology	A mycology expert, she was the first woman Dean of the Faculty of Science at the University of Singapore and the first woman member of the Public Service Commission.
Goh Soo Khim	(1944–)	2014	Arts/culture/entertainment	An instructor and the principal dancer at the Singapore Ballet Academy, she went on to serve as a co-director of the National Dance Company and founded the Singapore Dance Theatre.
Georgette Chen	(1906–1993)	2014	Arts/culture/entertainment	An acclaimed oil painter, she was one of a group of artists who established the Nanyang Style of painting, which combines Western technique with Asian themes.
Glory Barnabas	(1963–)	2019	Sports	Noted runner.
Goh Lay Kuan	(1939–)	2014	Arts/culture/entertainment	A choreographer, ballet dancer, and dance educator, she co-founded the Singapore Performing Arts School and created Nu Wa – Mender of the Heavens, Singapore's first modern dance production.
Grace Yin Pek-Ha	(1884–1972)	2018	Community/social work	Early social worker.
Fatimah binte Sulaiman	(1754?–1852?)	2014 *	Community/social work	A merchant and philanthropist, she donated money and land for the establishment of the Masjid Hajjah Fatimah mosque, which bears her name.
Han Sai Por	(1943–)	2014	Arts/culture/entertainment	Considered the top sculptor in Southeast Asia, her works are exhibited internationally, and she received the Cultural Medallion in 1995.
Helen Yeo Cheng Hoong	(1950–)	2014	Law	She grew the firm she co-founded by expanding into the then emerging markets of Vietnam and China, before orchestrating a merger that made her the managing partner of one of the country's largest law firms.
Halimah Yacob	(1954–)	2014	Government	She is both the first woman to serve as the Speaker of Parliament and the first woman of Malay descent to serve in Parliament, first woman to serve as the President of the Republic of Singapore.
Hedwig Anuar	(1928–)	2014	Government	The Director of the National Library of Singapore for 28 years, she was also a founder and one-time president of the women's rights group Association of Women for Action and Research (AWARE).
Ho Ching	(1953–)	2014	Business & enterprise	After rising through the ranks of the Ministry of Defense, she went on to lead the Singapore Technologies group and later became Chief Executive Officer of Temasek Holdings.
Ho Yuen Hoe	(1908–2006)	2014	Community/social work	A Buddhist nun and abbess, she founded Lin Chee Cheng Sia Temple and opened the nation's first Buddhist nursing home.
Ida Mabel Murray Simmons	(1882–1958)	2021	Health	Nurse who transformed maternal and infant health care.
Indranee Elizabeth Nadisen	(1940–)	2014	Community/social work	The nation's longest serving foster mother, she served as a foster mother for 35 years, caring for 45 children over that time.
Ivy Singh-Lim	(1949–)	2014	Environment/conservation	An advocate for farming in Singapore, she owns a chemical-free farm that is open to the public. She also served as the president of Netball Singapore for fourteen years, and worked to popularize the sport.
Jackie Yi-Ru Ying	(1966–)	2014	Science/technology	A leading researcher in nanotechnology, she left a professorship at MIT to found the Institute of Bioengineering and Nanotechnology to advance biomedical research in Singapore.
Jayalekshmi Mohideen	(1945–)	2016	Government	First woman career ambassador in Singapore.
Jennifer Lee Gek Choo	(1952–)	2014	Health	Serving with the Ministry of Health, Singapore General Hospital, and then with KK Women's and Children's Hospital, she became an advocate for family-friendly work practices.
Joscelin Yeo Wei Ling	(1979–)	2014	Sports	A swimmer, she is the only athlete to win 40 gold medals at the Southeast Asian Games, doing so over a 17-year career.
Janet Jesudason	(1936–)	2016	Sports	Pioneer athlete who represented Singapore in the 1956 Olympics.
Janet Lim Chiu Mei	(1923–2014)	2014	Health	At St Andrews Mission Hospital, she became the first Asian hospital matron. Her autobiography, Sold for Silver, was the first English-language book by a Singaporean author.
Janet Yee	(1934–2019)	2015	Community/social work	Recognized as a pioneering social worker, she campaigned to ensure that abandoned babies would be considered citizens, and thus able to receive social services.
Jenny Lau Buong Bee	(1932–2013)	2014	Law	She was the first woman to be appointed a district judge in Singapore.
Julie Tan Eng Poh	(1930–1995)	2014 *	Advocacy & activism	The founder of the first credit union for women in Singapore, the D.E.W. Credit Cooperative, she was also a founding member of the Singapore Council of Women's Organisations through her role as President of the YWCA.
Jing Junhong	(1968–)	2014	Sports	A Chinese-born naturalized Singaporean, she represented Singapore in Table tennis in the 1996, 2000, and 2004 Olympics, before becoming the national team coach.
Junie Sng Poh Leng	(1964–)	2014 *	Sports	The first woman from Singapore to win a gold medal for swimming at the Asian Games, at the time she was also the youngest person to win a medal at the competition.
Jennie Chua	(1945–)	2014	Business & enterprise	A leading executive in the hospitality industry, she grew Singapore's profile as a destination for conventions, and became the first woman to chair the Singapore International Chamber of Commerce.
Joanna Wong Quee Heng	(1939–)	2014	Arts/culture/entertainment	Considered the "doyenne of Cantonese opera in Singapore", she started the Chinese Theatre Circle to preserve the
Judith Prakash	(1951–)	2016	Law	The first judge appointed to hear arbitration cases brought before the Supreme Court.
Kandasamy Jayamani	(1955–)	2019	Sports	Long distance runner in Singapore.
Kanwaljit Soin	(1942–)	2014	Advocacy & activism	The nation's first woman Nominated Member of Parliament, the women's rights laws she pushed for were eventually included in the Women's Charter. She is also one of the founders of the Association of Women for Action and Research (AWARE).
Karen Tan Puay Kiow	(1962–)	2014	Uniformed professions	In 2005, she became the first female colonel in the Singapore Armed Forces.
Kartina Dahari	(1941–2014)	2015	Arts/culture/entertainment	A singer known as the "Queen of Keroncong", referring to a genre of Malay folk music, she performed internationally and for dignities visiting Singapore, and was signed by the record label EMI.
Kee Bee Khim	(1951–)	2022	Sports	Pioneer of women's golf in Singapore.
Khatijun Nissa Siraj	(1925–2023)	2014	Advocacy & activism	In response to an epidemic of women in the Singaporean Muslim community being abandoned through inexpensive and easy divorces, she pressed for the formation of a Syariah Court, and served as its first caseworker.
Khoo Teh Lynn	(1981–)	2014	Uniformed professions	She was the first female fighter pilot in Singapore.
Koh Chai Hong	(1959–)	2015	Uniformed professions	The first woman to qualify as a pilot in the Republic of Singapore Air Force, she is also one of the first two women (promoted at the same time) to reach the rank of lieutenant colonel.
Koh Kheng Lian	(1937–)	2014	Environment/conservation	An internationally recognized expert in Environmental law, she led the Asia-Pacific Centre for Environmental Law at the National University of Singapore to become a leading institution for the study of environmental law.
Koh Soo Boon	(1951–)	2022	Business & Enterprise	Founder of Singapore’s first female-led venture capital firm.
Kwa Geok Choo	(1920–2010)	2014	Law	The wife of Singapore's founding prime minister, Lee Kuan Yew, the pair (along with Lee's brother) co-founded Lee & Lee, which became of one of the largest law firms in Singapore. She was also a founding figure in the People's Action Party, and helped draft its constitution.
Kwan Shan Mei	(1922–2012)	2021	Arts/Culture/Media	Illustrator of children's books, arts educator.
Lai Siu Chiu	(1948–)	2016	Law	The first woman to serve on the Singapore Supreme Court.
Lam Lay Yong	(1936–)	2014	Science/technology	An authority on the history of Chinese Mathematics, she was the first person from Asia to win the Kenneth O. May Prize.
Lee Suet Fern	(1958–)	2014	Law	The founder of the Stamford Law Corporation, a significant player in the mergers and acquisitions business, she also served as the President of the Inter-Pacific Bar Association and the corporate boards of several Fortune 100 companies.
Leo Yee Sin	(1959–)	2022	Health	Leader in the fight against infectious disease.
Lily Kong	(1965–)	2022	Education	First Singaporean woman to head a Singapore university.
Lim Soo Hoon	(1959–)	2014	Government	The first woman Permanent Secretary in Singapore, she served in leadership positions across Singapore's civil service, especially in the areas of transport and community development.
Laurentia Tan	(1979–)	2014	Sports	The most decorated paralympian from Singapore, she won two medals in each of the 2008 and 2012 Paralympics, all in dressage.
Li Lienfung	(1923–2011)	2014	Arts/culture/entertainment	A newspaper columnist, novelist, and playwright, her work received awards from the National Book Development Council and the Culture Ministry.
Lucy Wan	(1933–2017)	2014	Science/technology	She was the first woman to earn a doctorate in pharmacy from the National University of Singapore, she would go on to teach at the program for 40 years, leading it for six.
Leaena Tambyah	(1937–2023)	2014	Advocacy & activism	A social worker and advocate for youth with special needs, she created the Handicapped Children's Playgroup, which was awarded the United Nations Community Excellence Award.
Liew Yuen Sien	(1901–1975)	2019	Education	Principal of the Nanyang Girls' School.
Lim Hwee Hua	(1959–)	2014 *	Government	She was the first female Deputy Speaker of Parliament and the first female Cabinet Minister in Singapore.
Lynnette Seah	(1957–)	2015	Arts/culture/entertainment	A Cultural Medallion-winning violinist, she was a founding member of the Singapore Symphony Orchestra, which she co-leads.
Lee Choo Neo	(1895–1947)	2014	Health	She was the first practicing woman doctor in what would become Singapore. Together with two other women, she created the Chinese Marriage Committee, which produced a report that would come to be influential in the passage of the Women's Charter.
Lim Sok Bee	(1963–)	2014	Uniformed professions	The first woman commander of an artillery battalion, she eventually rose to the rank of Lieutenant colonel and served as the Wing Commander at the Officer Cadet School.
Mae Noeline Oehlers	(1916–1987)	2021	Sports	Hockey player, first Singaporean principal at Raffles Girls School, educator.
Maggie Lim	(1913–1995)	2014	Health	A doctor and family planning and reproductive rights advocate, she was the first girl in Singapore to win the Queen's Scholarship.
Margaret Leng Tan	(1945–)	2014	Arts	Toy piano virtuoso.
Maria Dyer	(1803–1845)	2014 *	Education	A British missionary, in 1842 she founded St. Margaret's School, the first school for girls in East Asia. The institution took in and educated poor girls, preventing them from becoming Mui Tsai.
Marjorie Doggett	(1921–2010)	2017	Advocacy & Activism	Animal rights advocate.
Mary Beatrice Klass	(1935–)	2016	Sports	Pioneering athlete and one of two women at the 1956 Olympics.
Mary Quintal	(1930–)	2014	Uniformed professions	The first woman Assistant Superintendent of Police in Singapore, she was also the force's first female Inspector.
May Wong	(1899–1989)	2016	Community/social work	Lifelong social worker and fund-raiser.
Miranda Yap	(1948–2015)	2018	Science/technology	Pioneer biomedical scientist.
Mozelle Nissim	(1883–1975)	2018	Community/social work	Jewish philanthropist and community leader.
Myrna Braga-Blake	(1935–2019)	2021	Community/Social Work	Pioneer in social work, educator. Helped set up services for victims of domestic violence and trained social workers.
Nalla Tan	(1923–2012)	2015	Education	Writer and advocate for sex and public health education.
Neila Sathyalingam	(1938–2017)	2014	Arts/culture/entertainment/media	Leading teacher of Indian classical dance in Singapore.
Noeleen Heyzer	(1948–)	2014	Advocacy & activism	As the leader of the United Nations Economic and Social Commission for Asia and the Pacific (ESCAP), she has worked on regional poverty alleviation, societal, and environmental programs. She has also led the United Nations Development Fund for Women and other UN initiatives.
Nona Asiah	(1931–2024)	2022	Media and Entertainment	An icon of Malay music and film in the 1950s and 1960s.
Olivia Lum	(1961–)	2014	Business & Enterprise	Founder of Hyflux.
Oon Chiew Seng	(1916–2022)	2014	Health	Founder of the first nursing home for dementia patients.
Patricia Chan Li-Yin	(1954–)	2014	Sports	Trailblazing swimmer and Singapore’s first Golden Girl.
Phan Wait Hong	(1914–2016)	2014	Arts/culture/entertainment	Called "grande dame of Beijing opera in Singapore", she moved to Singapore at age 14 as part of an opera troupe. She performed regularly until the age of 82, and gave a limited number of performances for a decade afterwards.
Phyllis Eu Cheng Li	(1914–2004)	2014	Advocacy & activism	Elected to the Municipal Commission (now the City Council) in 1949, she was the first woman in Singapore to be elected to a government office.
Phyllis Tan Poh Lian	(1933–)	2018	Law	Lawyer and first woman to lead a law society in Singapore.
Puan Noor Aishah	(1933–2025)	2018	Community/social work	The first First Lady in Singapore.
Rahimah Rahim	(1955–)	2017	Arts/Culture/Entertainment/Media	Singer who is known as "Singapore's first Lady of Song."
Ruth Wong Hie King	(1918–1982)	2014	Education	Pioneering educator who transformed teacher training in Singapore.
Santha Bhaskar	(1939–2022)	2021	Arts/Media/Culture	Dancer and choreographer.
Sarah Winstedt	(1886–1972)	2014	Health	Physician and surgeon who served with the Colonial Medical Service in British Malaya.
Shirin Fozdar	(1905–1992)	2014 *	Advocacy & activism	A women's rights activist, she played a major role in the establishment of the Singapore Council of Women and the creation of the Syariah Court.
Singapore Women's Everest Team	—	2014	Adventurers & explorers	Jane Lee, Sim Yihui, Joanne Soo, Lee Peh Gee, Lee Li Hui, and Esther Tan – nation's first all-women mountain climbing team – attempted to scale Mount Everest, with all but Sim reaching the summit.
Seow Peck Leng	(1911–2007)	2014	Advocacy & activism	An educator and politician, she founded the Siglap Girls' Club for the benefit of underprivileged girls, and pushed for gender equality as a member of the Legislative Assembly.
Sophia Blackmore	(1857–1927)	2014	Education	Founder of Methodist Girls’ School.
Sophia Pang	(1972–)	2014	Adventurers & explorers	Traveling as part of the 2009 Kaspersky Commonwealth Antarctic Expedition, she became the first Singaporean woman to reach the South Pole.
Mathilde Raclot	(1814–1911)	2014	Education	Founder of the Convent of the Holy Infant Jesus schools.
Stella Kon	(1944–)	2014	Arts/culture/entertainment/media	Award winning writer, best known for Emily of Emerald Hill.
Suchen Christine Lim	(1948–)	2014	Arts & Culture	Award-winning novelist.
Sudha Nair	(1957–)	2022	Community/Social work	Pioneering social worker and family violence specialist.
Sylvia Kho	(1917–2013)	2017	Business & Enterprise	Pioneering bridal gown designer and entrepreneur.
Tan Cheng Hiong	(1904–1999)	2016	Advocacy & activism	Women's rights activist, and first president of the Singapore Council of Women.
Tan Chew Neo	(1898–1986)	2015	Community/Social Work	Pioneering community worker.
Tan Sau Fun	(1931–2011)	2014	Science/Technology	First and only female professor of chemistry in Singapore.
Tan Teck Neo	(1877–1978)	2018	Community/social work	Community leader, philanthropist and advocate for women in the public space.
Tan Yoon Yin	(1929–2023)	2016	Sports	Founder of Singapore Women’s Netball Association.
Tang Pui Wah	(1933–)	2014	Sports	Hurdler and Singapore’s first female Olympian.
Theresa Poh Lin Chan	(1943–2016)	2014	Education	The Helen Keller of Southeast Asia.
Teo Ah Hong	(1953–2020)	2021	Uniformed Professions	First woman to qualify as a commercial pilot.
Teo Soon Kim	(1904–1978)	2014	Law	First woman to be admitted to the Singapore bar.
Teresa Hsu Chih	(1898–2014)	2014	Community/social work	One of the most beloved social workers in Singapore.
Tham Yew Chin	(1950–)	2019	Arts/culture/entertainment/media	One of the best-known writers from Singapore in China.
Theresa Poh Lin Chan	(1943–2016)	2014	Education	The Helen Keller of Southeast Asia.
Theresa Foo	(1943–)	2014	Business & Enterprise	First Asian female chief executive at Standard Chartered Bank.
Theresa Goh	(1987–)	2014	Sports	Pioneering Paralympic swimmer and advocate for disability sports.
Thung Syn Neo	(1932–)	2014	Community/Social Work	Pioneering social worker and key mover behind the Family Service Centre initiative.
Violet Oon	(1949–)	2016	Arts/culture/entertainment/media	Advocate and champion for Singaporean cuisine.
Wong-Lee Siok Tin	(1938–1993)	2017	Arts/culture/entertainment/media	English-language journalist and broadcaster.
Yang Chang Man	(1944–)	2018	Environment/conservation	Zoologist, curator and woman who saved the priceless Raffles Collection.
Yip Pin Xiu	(1991–)	2014	Sports	Singapore’s first Olympic-level gold medal winner.
Yu-Foo Yee Shoon	(1950–)	2014 *	Government	She was both one of the first women in the Parliament of Singapore and the nation's first female mayor.
Yuen Peng McNeice	(1917–2012)	2015	Environment/Conservation	Philanthropist and pioneering conservationist.
Zahrah Za'ba	(1920–1988)	2019	Arts/culture/entertainment/media	Writer and pioneer in Malay radio broadcasting.
Zena Clarke Tessensohn	(1909–1996)	2018	Sports	One of the 12 founders of the Girls Sports Club (GSC).
Zuraidah Abdullah	(1962–)	2014	Uniformed Professions	First woman to become a Senior Assistant Commissioner of Police.

== Gallery ==
Agnes Joaquim, orchid breeder

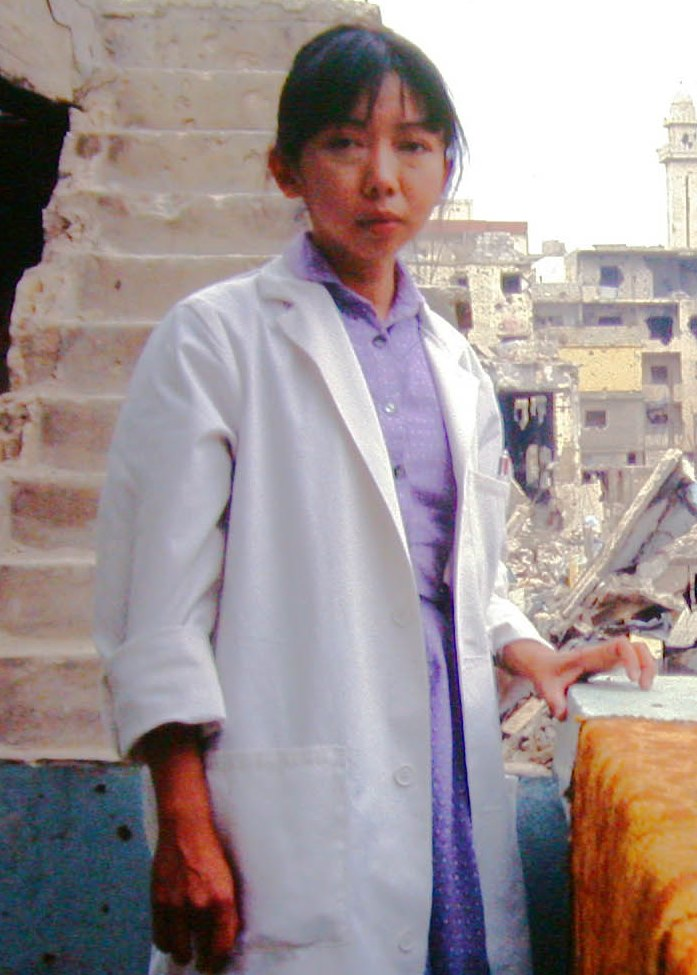
Ang Swee Chai, doctor and writer

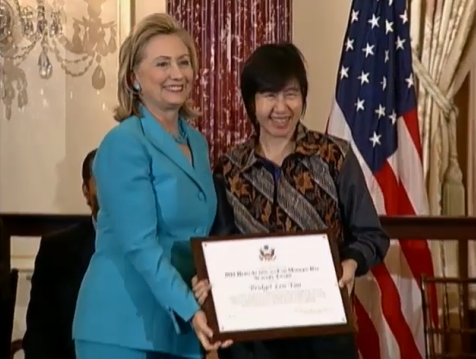
Bridget Tan, worker's rights advocate

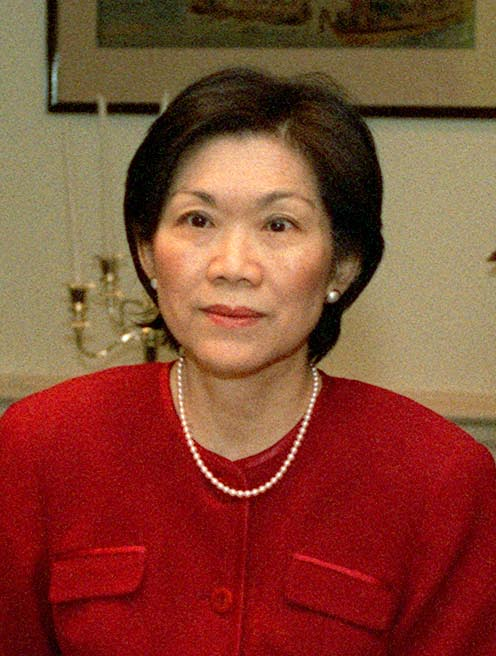
Chan Heng Chee, Ambassador

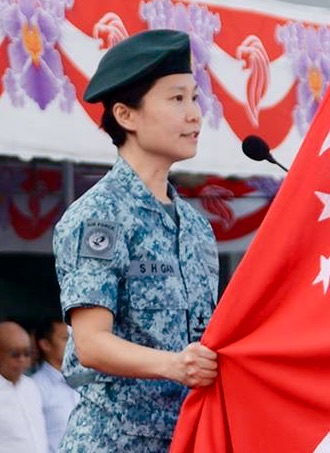
Gan Siow Huang, politician and former soldier

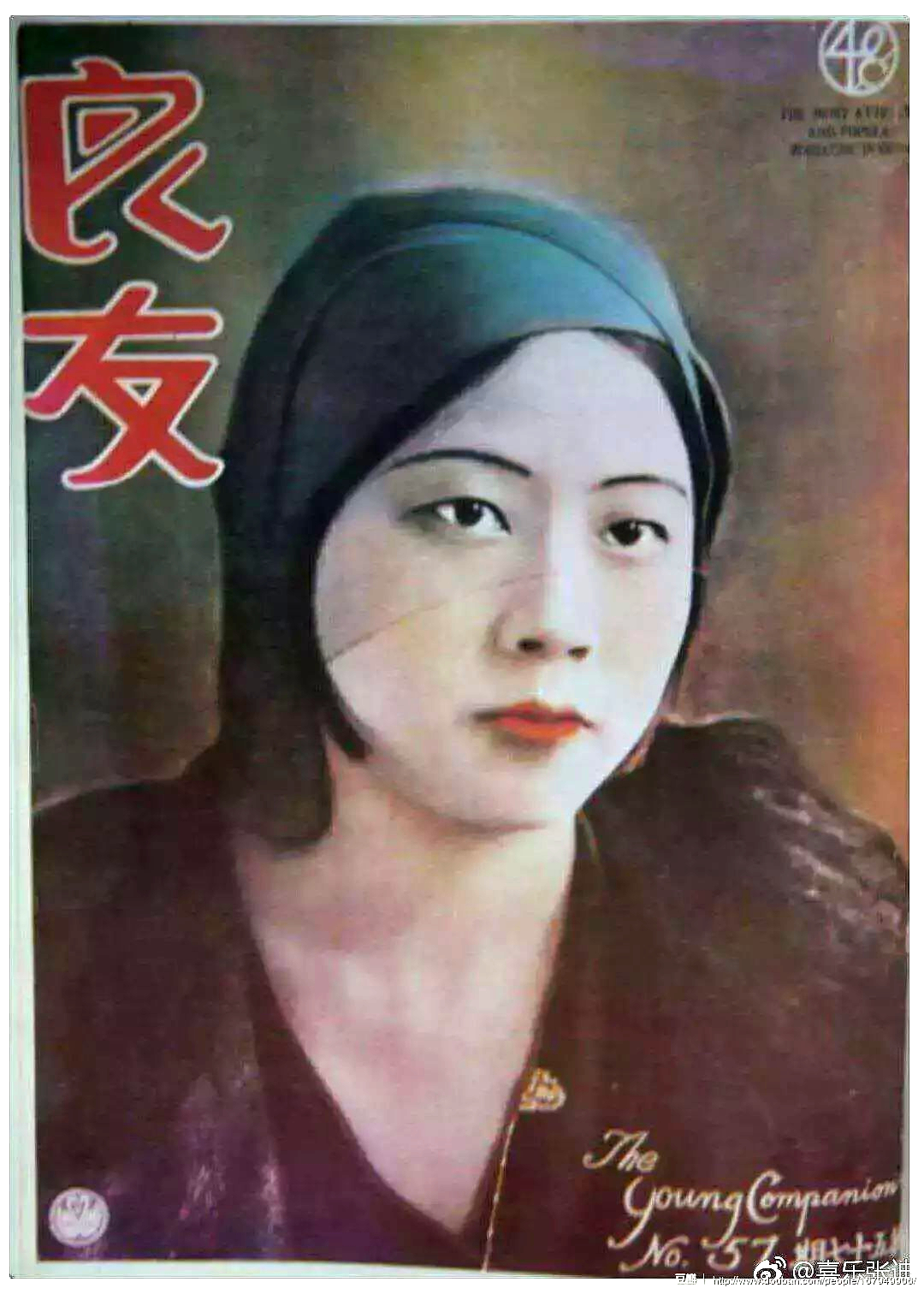
Georgette Chen, artist

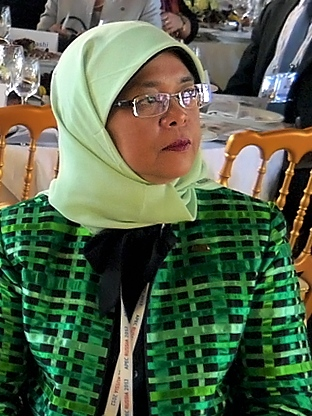
Halimah Yacob, President and former Speaker of Parliament

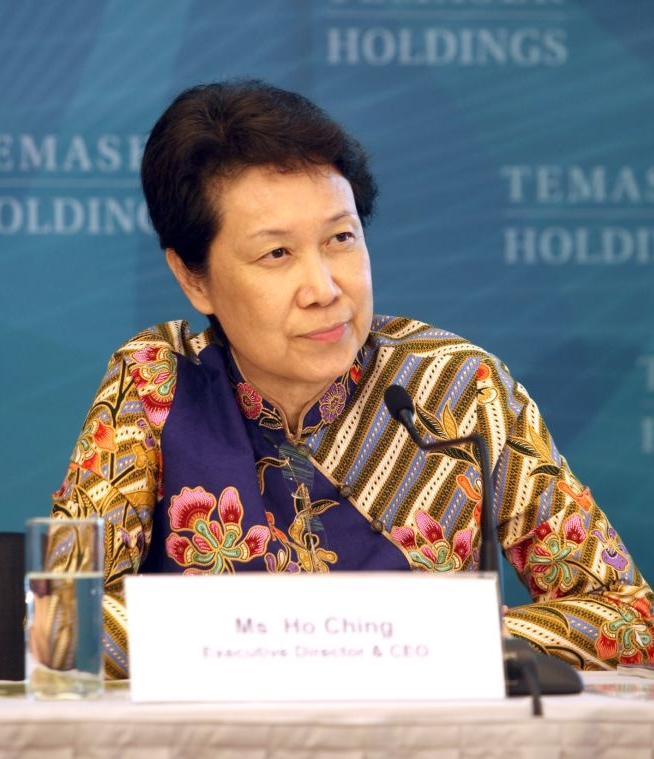
Ho Ching, CEO of Temasek Holdings

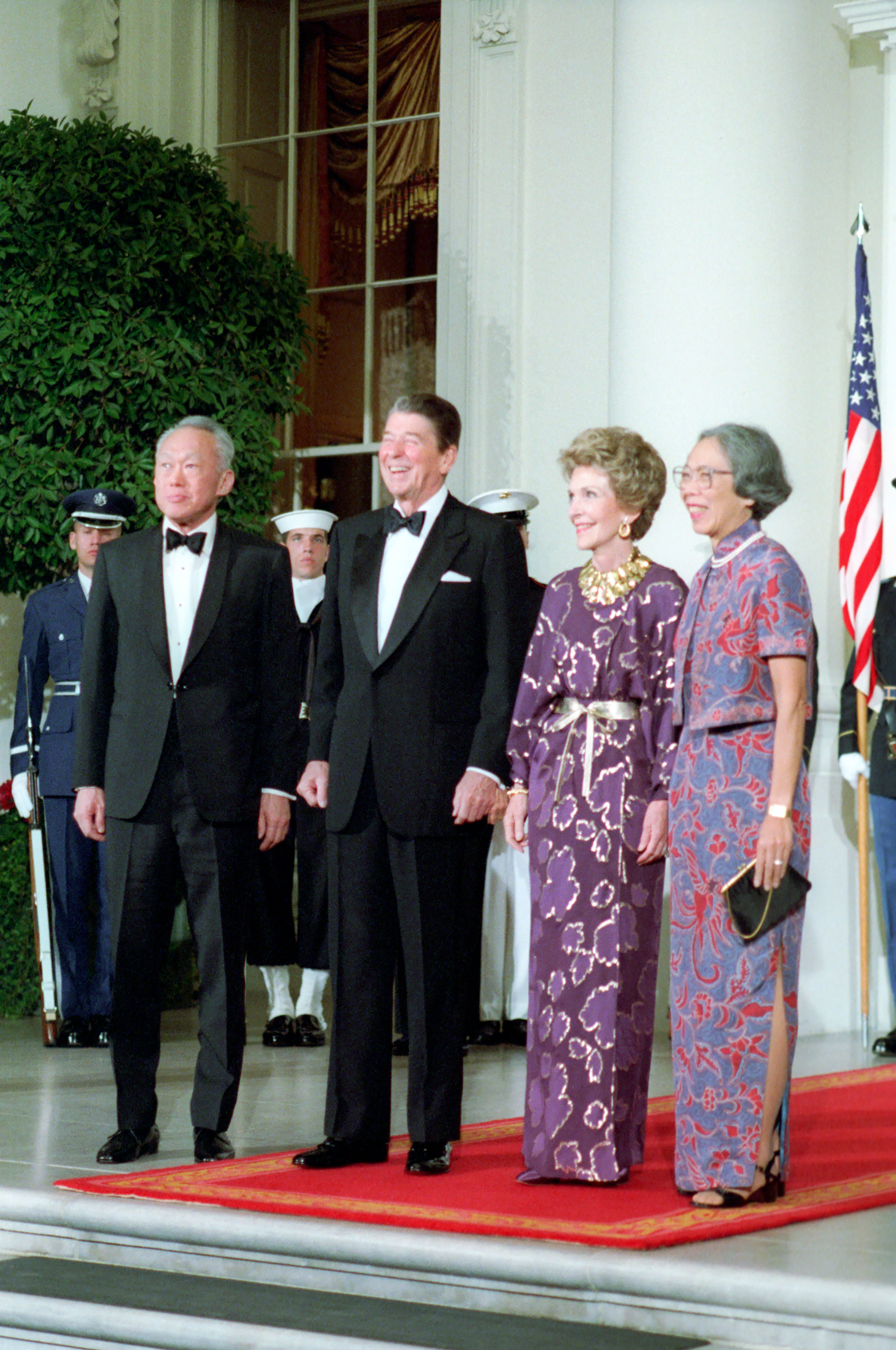
Kwa Geok Choo, lawyer

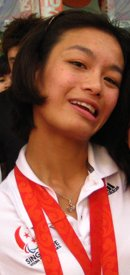
Laurentia Tan, Paralympic equestrian

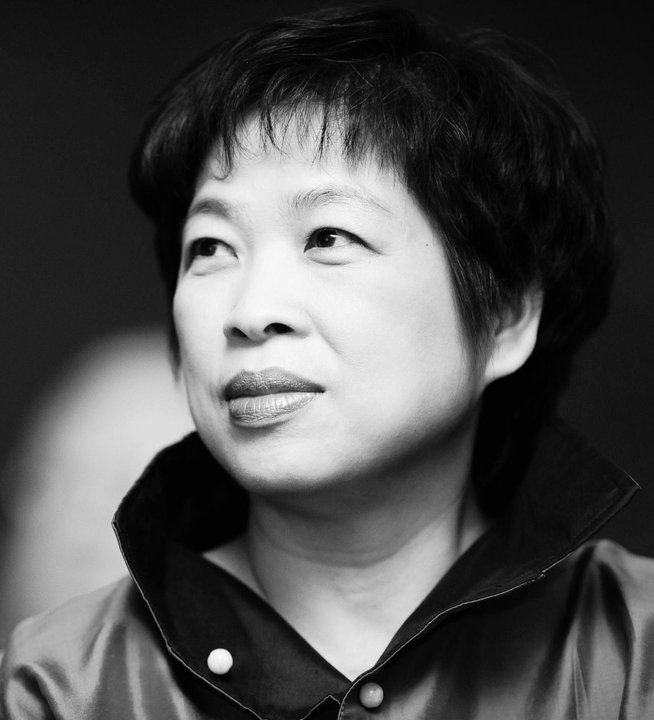
Lim Hwee Hua, politician

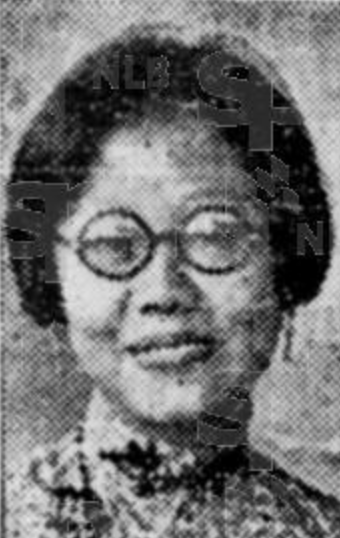
Maggie Lim, physician

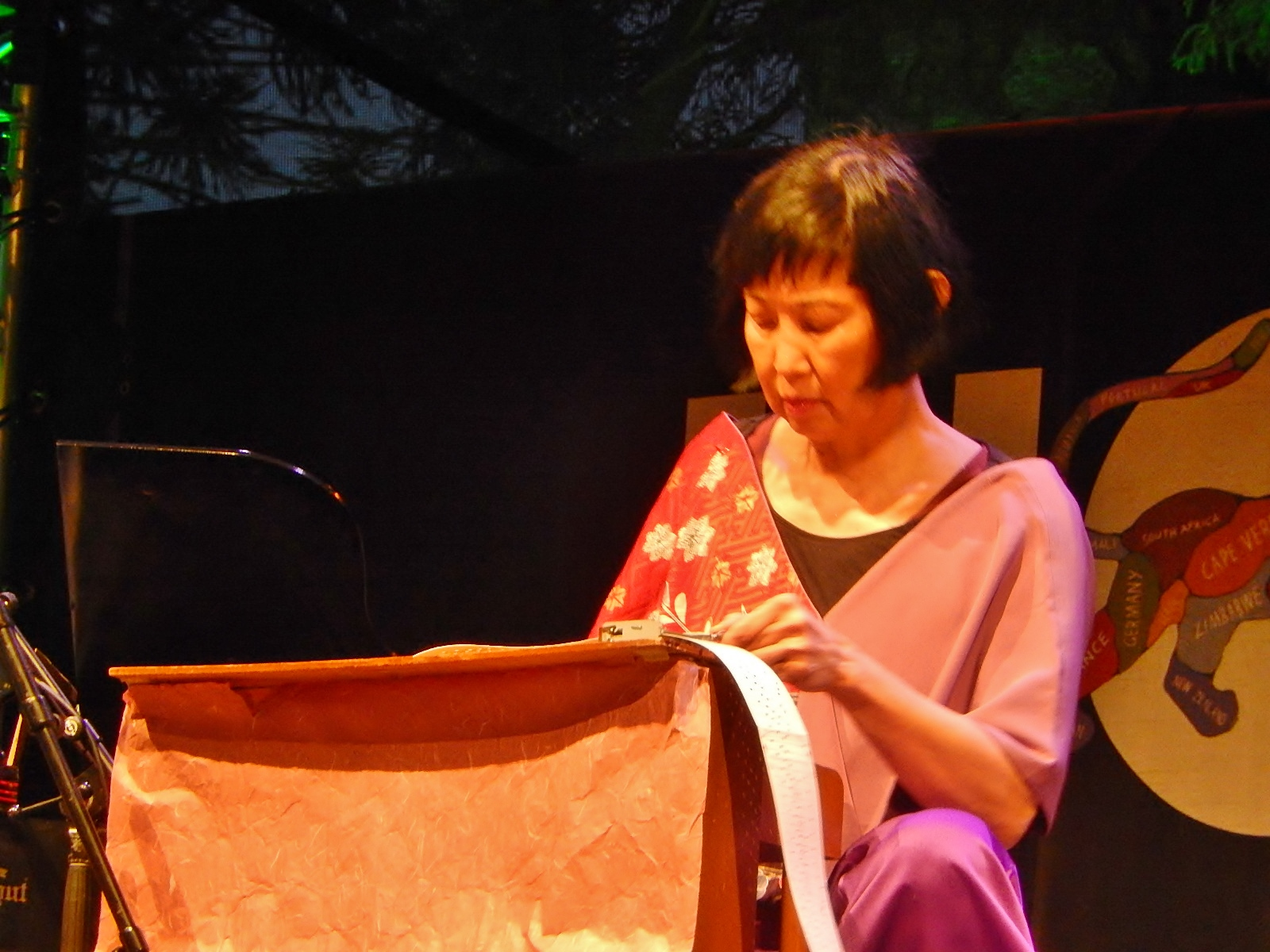
Margaret Leng Tan, classical music artist

Maria Dyer, educator and missionary

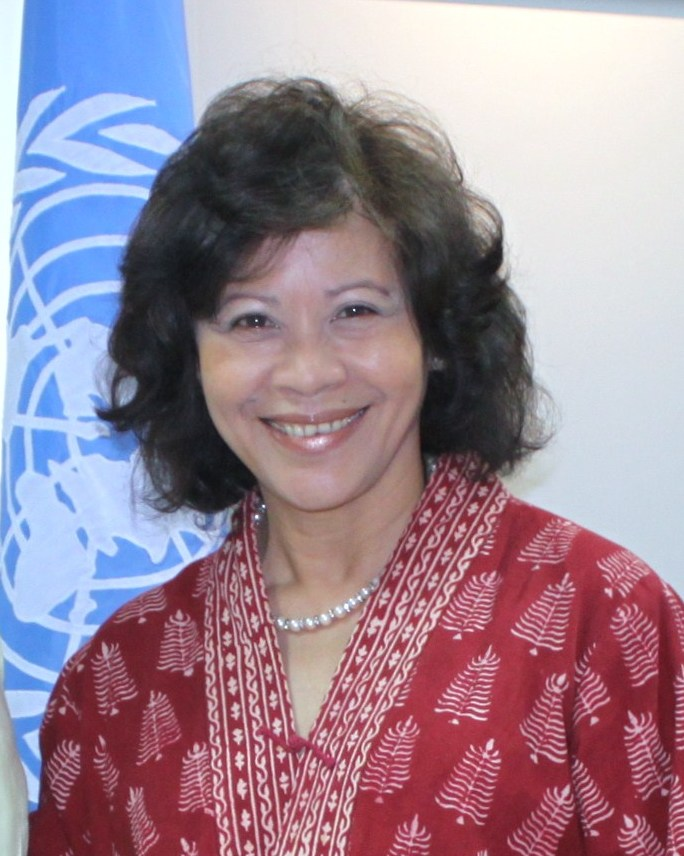
Noeleen Heyzer, United Nations official

Teresa Hsu, charity worker
