= Lilian Choo =

Musical director

Lilian Choo was a prominent musical director for operas and musicals in Singapore in the late 1960s and early 1970s. She was also a singer and the conductor for the Bel Canto Singers, a popular choir. Choo was awarded the Pingat Bakti Masyarakat in 1979.

== Early life and education ==
Born in Singapore, Choo attended the Methodist Girls' School. She then left for Australia and studied at the University of Melbourne under a Colombo Plan scholarship. Although she was not initially interested in the scholarship, her friends persuaded her to try out for it. After graduating with a Bachelor of Music degree, she chose to remain at the university for another year to attain a Diploma of Education with honours. She also received a licentiate Diploma in Pianoforte (teaching) from ABRSM, as well as a licentiate Diploma in Singing (performing) from the Australian Music Education Board.

== Career ==
While in Melbourne, Choo performed on the radio and television there and served as the musical director of the Methodist Ladies' College. She returned to Singapore in 1963. In 1965, Choo founded Bel Canto Singers, a choir of women, and the Camarata, a choir of men, as she had missed conducting. Initially, the Bel Canto Singers mainly performed madrigals while the Camarata mainly performed genres such as Spirituals. However, both groups eventually shifted to light classical music. The Bel Canto Singers became a "household word in Singapore" and were "in great demand over radio and TV Singapore." The Camarata also frequently performed on television. She was also employed in the music section of the Ministry of Education, being one of only two employees in the section. As she could speak Mandarin, she taught courses in Chinese schools. In December 1967, she conducted the Sceneshifters's staging of Patience. In the same year, she was the soprano in a performance of Elijah. However, the role would be her last vocal performance for several years, as she found working on Patience to be "so exciting" that she chose to focus on directing instead. This also led to the Bel Canto Singers being "neglected" with many of its members marrying or leaving Singapore.

By August 1969, Choo had become "well-known in Singapore's musical circles as a singer and musical director." The Straits Times also called her a "competent teacher". On 3 September, she held a vocal concert at the Victoria Theatre and Concert Hall featuring her students, the proceeds of which were to be donated to the National Kidney Foundation Fund. The performance was produced by Eileen Smith. A review of the production published in The Straits Times praised Choo for "conducting with verve and vitality". She directed a staging of the opera Princess Ida in November. Choo made her first appearance as the conductor of the Singapore Musical Society Choir at a performance at the Singapore Conference Hall on 9 September 1970. She director for a November 1971 staging by the Young Musician's Society of The Sound of Music, which was produced by Smith. The New Nation noted in August that, by then, Choo and Smith had been "working successfully as a team for many years." In the same month, she directed a Sceneshifters staging of the operetta La belle Hélène.

In September 1972, she portrayed the character of Galatea in the Singapore Chamber Ensemble's performance of Handel's Acis and Galatea. A review of the production by Violet Oon of the New Nation praised her "bright, silver-textured voice", which made her "well-suited" for the role. She had been persuaded by conductor Paul Abisheganaden and it was the first time she had taken a singing role since Elijah. In the same month, she performed as a soprano at the 10th concert of the Ministry of Culture's Music for Everyone series held at the Singapore Conference Hall. She was one of four "leading musicians" who had a solo part in the performance. Choo sang the soprano solo in the Singapore Chamber Ensemble's performance of Handel's Messiah in November and conducted the Singapore Musical Society's performance of A Ceremony of Carols in December.

In 1973, the Wesley Methodist Church approached her, asking her to host a recital to aid its building fund. She then suggested a full programme featuring the Bel Canto Singers and the Camarata. Both choirs were then reformed as one under the Bel Canto Singers name with a few new members. The group performed at the RELC Auditorium on 4 November, with the proceeds contributing to the construction of the Bible House on Armenian Street. In the same month, she directed the Young Musician's Society staging of The King and I, which was also produced by Smith. In a December 1974 production of Elijah, she portrayed the widow. In September 1977, she conducted and performed in an opera excerpt from Dido and Aeneas as part of a Music for Everyone concert. She sang in a production of Messiah directed by Quek Swee Hua in December.

Choo received the Pingat Bakti Masyarakat at the 1979 National Day Awards. She was the first to have received the award under its new provisions, which were from that year on given to those who "excelled in the arts and letters, sports and science". She was then "still popular among music circles" and a member of the organising committee for the Music for Everyone series. In 1980, she was placed in charge of the tenor section of the newly-formed Singapore Symphony Orchestra Choir, which featured several other "superstars of Singapore singing." In March, she directed The Acts, a choral drama described as a "Biblical account of the events which took place after the death and ascension of Jesus Christ." In July, she directed a production of The Mikado which was staged as part of MGS Stage '80, a fundraising effort. By July 1981, she had spent several months training a choir comprising 150 members from five churches. She was still the director of the Bel Canto Singers at its 10th anniversary concert in 1983. By 1994, she had become the conductor for the Wesley Methodist Church Choir. She was still teaching music then.

== Personal life ==
Violinist Choo Shiow-Ling is her daughter. Choo served on the committee of the Methodist Girls' School Alumnae Association She was elected the organisation's vice-president in 1977.
