= Ann Elizabeth Wee =

Singaporean academic

- Born: Ann Elizabeth Wilcox; 19 August 1926; Corbridge, Northumberland, England
- Died: 11 December 2019 (aged 93); Singapore
- Other names: Ann Wee
- Occupations: educator, social worker
- Years active: 1950–2009
- Known for: establishing the profession of social work in Singapore

Ann Elizabeth Wee (née Wilcox; 19 August 1926 – 11 December 2019) was a British-born Singaporean academic and social worker, who was called the founding mother of social work in Singapore. She was known for pioneering professional social work in Singapore and as the longest-serving head of the Department of Social Work in the National University of Singapore. She was the inaugural recipient of the lifetime volunteer achievement award of the Ministry of Community Development, Youth and Sports in 2009, was honored with the Meritorious Service Medal in 2010 and was inducted into the Singapore Women's Hall of Fame in 2014.

== Early life ==
Ann Elizabeth Wilcox was born on 19 August 1926 in Corbridge, Northumberland, England to a middle-class family. Her father was an insurance salesman and her mother was a homemaker. After finishing her A-levels, in 1944 Wilcox joined the Red Cross and worked as a live-in domestic at Howick Hall. The former home of the Prime Minister Charles Grey, 2nd Earl Grey, for whom the famous tea is named, had been turned into a military hospital, during World War II.

When she completed her service, Wilcox began attending the London School of Economics, reading economics. In 1945, the school was evacuated because of bombings to Cambridge University. While continuing her studies in Cambridge, Wilcox met a Singaporean law student, Harry Lee Wee, at a social function and they began dating. In 1946, both Wilcox and Wee returned to London. He completed an internship as a legal clerk and took his law examination and she finished her undergraduate degree in economics in 1947 and began her master's studies in social anthropology. Harry returned to Singapore in 1948, while Wilcox remained in London to complete her schooling. She also did relief work in the slum neighborhoods of London, taking social surveys when the war ended. In March, 1950, Wilcox began the three-month voyage to reunite with Harry in Singapore and on 28 June 1950, the couple were married at St Andrew's Cathedral.

== Career ==
Soon after her marriage, three teachers resigned from posts at the Methodist Girls' School and Wee was urged by her mother-in-law to apply for a position. She would teach at the school for four years. In 1952, she also began teaching social work classes at the National University of Singapore (NUS), which at the time was known as the University of Malaya in Singapore, on a part-time basis. Throughout 1955 and 1956, Wee worked in the Social Welfare Department of the government. She worked as a training officer and was required to make home visits for the counseling and advice section. During her assessments in shanty towns and shops in Chinatown, she had to learn Cantonese and Hokkien on the job, so that she could communicate with her clients. At the end of 1956, Wee left government service when a full-time teaching post opened up at the university in the Social Studies Department.

In 1967, Wee applied for the post of Department Head for the university's Department of Social Work and formally assumed the post in 1968. Over the next two decades, she worked to implement policy and change the perception that social workers were not professionals but suppliers of "tea and sympathy". When other departments were eliminated, she fought for social work to be retained and an honours course to be added to the department's curriculum. In 1970, Wee began working with the Juvenile Court as an advisor in child protection. She also served as an advisor to the Ministry of Social Affairs on women's and girl's issues and on the board of both the National Youth Leadership Training Institute and the National Trades Union Congress, advising on a program to implement dental care. She was awarded the Bintang Bakti Masyarakat by President Benjamin Sheares in 1973. Working as the department head until her retirement in 1986, her career spanned the longest term as department head in the history of the university. Despite retiring as head of the department, Wee continued teaching as an associate professor at NUS. In 2004, she authored Social Work in the Singapore Context, the "only textbook on social work in Singapore". Wee continued her involvement as a social worker with the juvenile courts until 2009, retiring with almost four decades of service.

In 2009, Wee became the inaugural honoree for the lifetime volunteer achievement award presented by the Ministry of Community Development, Youth and Sports to recognize her work with the Juvenile Courts. She was honored with the Meritorious Service Medal in 2010 for her pioneering efforts in social work, often being referred to as the "founding mother" of the field in Singapore. In 2014, she was inducted into the Singapore Women's Hall of Fame. She published her memoir, A Tiger Remembers: The Way We Were in Singapore in 2016. The Ann Wee NUS Social Work Alumni Award, is presented in her honor by the National University of Singapore to recognize excellence in social work.

== Death and legacy ==
Wee died on 11 December 2019 at age 93. She is remembered as the 'founding mother' of social work in Singapore.

== Works ==
- — (1963). "Chinese-Malay Relationships: The Conflict of Social Values in a Plural Society". In Szczepanik, E.F. (ed.). Symposium on Economic and Social Problems of the Far East: Proceedings of a Meeting Held in September 1961 as Part of the Golden Jubilee Congress of the University of Hong Kong. Hong Kong: Hong Kong University Press. (Also known as the Hong Kong University Symposium on Economic and Social Problems of the Far East.)
- — (1972). Some Social Implications of Rehousing Programmes in Singapore. Hong Kong University Press.
- —, ed. (1973). Two studies of social work in the field of abortion: Virginia Heng and Laily Ibrahim. Univ. of Singapore Dept. of Social Work. ASIN B000XCOH7C. OCLC 220566890.
- —; Vaithilingam, D. K. (1973). Family planning and family organisation. OCLC 251422982.
- —; Galvez, Cherie; Singapore Council of Social Service (1986). A survey of youth-work agencies. The Council. OCLC 226123049.
- — (1986). "Early social work resource literature in Singapore". In Kapur, Basant K. (ed.). Singapore Studies: Critical Surveys of the Humanities and Social Sciences. Vol. 1. Singapore University Press. pp. 65–81. ISBN 978-9971-69-105-9. OCLC 1080552938.
- — (1992). Demographic trends: The era of the ageing society: A matter of concern for women and for women's organisations. ASEAN Confederation of Women's Organisations, 5th General Assembly. Brunei. OCLC 1103286613.
- — (2002). "Social work education in Singapore". In Tan, Ngoh Tiong; Mehta, Kalyani (eds.). Extending frontiers: Social issues and social work in Singapore. Eastern Universities Press. ISBN 981-210-216-7. OCLC 51231611.
- Mehta, Kalyani K.; —, eds. (2004). Social work in context: A reader. Singapore: Marshall Cavendish Academic. ISBN 978-981-210-310-9. OCLC 58536062.
- — (2011). "Where we are coming from, social and welfare interventions when Singapore was a British colony". In Mehta, Kalyani K.; Wee, Ann Elizabeth (eds.). Social Work in the Singapore Context (2nd ed.). Singapore: Pearson. ISBN 978-981-06-8651-2. OCLC 741539477.
- — (2011). "Concepts in context, concepts are there to make learning easier". In Mehta, Kalyani K.; Wee, Ann Elizabeth (eds.). Social Work in the Singapore Context (2nd ed.). Singapore: Pearson. ISBN 978-981-06-8651-2. OCLC 741539477.
- Ho Chi Tim; — (2016). Social services. Singapore: Institute of Policy Studies / Straits Times Press. ISBN 978-981-4747-49-3. OCLC 962171475.
- — (2016). A tiger remembers: The way we were in Singapore. Singapore: Ridge Books. ISBN 978-981-4722-37-7. OCLC 960841593.
