= Teo Ah Hong =

Singaporean pilot

Teo Ah Hong (1953 - 2020) was the first woman to obtain a commercial pilot license in Singapore and later became an instructor at the Singapore Flying College. She was posthumously inducted into the Singapore Women's Hall of Fame.

== Early life and education ==
Teo was born in Singapore in 1953. She attended Elling South Primary School and later Raffles Girls' School from 1965 to 1971. She was a Bachelor of Economics graduate of the University of Sydney

== Career ==
She applied to enter the Junior Flying Club in 1971, and was accepted. She then became one of five women who completed the six-month flying course, after which she put in her application to become a trainee pilot. However, she was rejected as she was a woman. She was then offered a place in the Singapore General Aviation Services pilot-instructor course. She was the only woman to have been offered a spot in the course. She passed her examinations and received her commercial pilot's license in 1974, becoming the first woman to obtain a commercial pilot license in Singapore. She then became the first female instructor at the Singapore General Aviation Pilots Training School.

In 1989, she joined the Singapore Flying College as an instructor. She became the college's chief flying instructor the following year, and remained the chief flying instructor until 2001. After leaving the college, she became an instructor at the Singapore Youth Flying Club. She then moved to Perth and became an instructor at the China Southern Airlines Training School.

== Personal life and death ==
After moving to Perth, Teo frequently volunteered at a local Buddhist temple.

She was diagnosed with cancer in 2015 and died in 2020. She was posthumously inducted into the Singapore Women's Hall of Fame in 2021.
