= Jane Lee =

Jane Lee may refer to:

- Jane Lee (actress) (1912–1957), American child actress
- Jane Lee (politician) (born 1979), Li Mei-jhen, Taiwanese politician
- Jane Lee (mountaineer) (born 1984), Singaporean mountain climber
