= Albert Chua =

Singaporean diplomat

Albert Chua PPA(E)
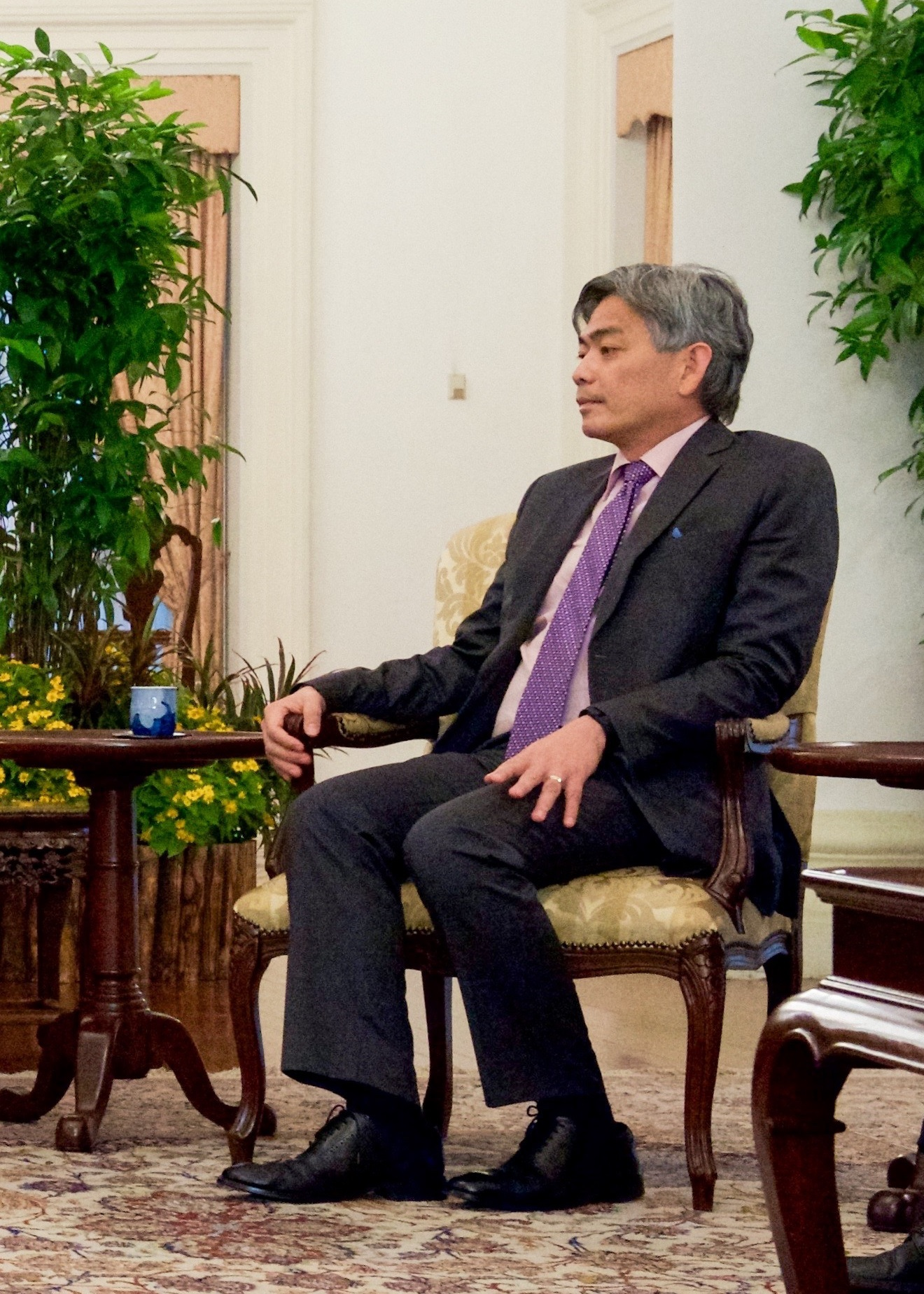

Permanent Secretary, Ministry of Foreign Affairs (Singapore)
- Incumbent
- Assumed office April 2022
- Preceded by: Chee Wee Kiong

Permanent Secretary, Ministry of the Environment and Water Resources
- In office October 2017 – March 2022
- Preceded by: Choi Shing Kwok
- Succeeded by: Stanley Loh

Singaporean Permanent Representative to the United Nations
- In office August 2011 – June 2013
- Preceded by: Vanu Gopala Menon
- Succeeded by: Karen Tan

Singaporean High Commissioner to Australia
- In office March 2008 – June 2011

Personal details
- Born: 1968 (age 57–58) Singapore
- Education: University of East Anglia (BA); Harvard University (MPA)

Albert Chua (born 1968) is a Singaporean civil servant and diplomat who is serving as the Permanent Secretary of the Ministry of Foreign Affairs of Singapore. He also served as Permanent Representative of Singapore to the United Nations from 2011 to 2013.

== Education ==
He was educated at Raffles Institution, the University of East Anglia (BA, English Literature, 1990) and Harvard Kennedy School at Harvard University (MPA, 2000).

== Career ==
Chua joined the Ministry of Foreign Affairs in 1992, serving as Deputy Trade Representative at the Singapore Trade Office in Taipei from March 1994 to February 1997, and Deputy Secretary (Policy) of the Ministry of Foreign Affairs from August 2001 to February 2004.

He served as a Principal Private Secretary to then-Senior Minister Goh Chok Tong from August 2004 to September 2007, and was appointed Singaporean High Commissioner to Australia from March 2008 to June 2011. He was appointed Permanent Secretary (Foreign Affairs) in April 2022, having formerly been Permanent Secretary (Sustainability and the Environment). He also served as a board member of the Middle East Institute and the Institute of South Asian Studies.

== Awards ==
Chua was awarded the Public Administration Medal (Gold) in 2017.
