= Singapore Children's Society =

The Singapore Children's Society (Mandarin: 新加坡儿童会) is a child protection organization operating in Singapore.

Established in 1952, its services have evolved to meet the changing needs of children. Today, Children's Society operates 12 service centres islandwide, offering services in the four categories of: Vulnerable Children and Youth, Children and Youth Services, Family Services, and Research and Advocacy.

== Mission ==
To bring relief and happiness to children in need.

== Vision ==
To be a leading edge organisation in promoting the well-being of the child.

== Core Values ==
- Compassion and Caring
- Commitment
- Professionalism
- Integrity
- Openness to Change

== History ==
Singapore Children's Society was founded on 17 April 1952 by a group of civic-minded citizens. The group started with a convalescent home for malnourished children in Changi that was subsequently gazetted as a place of safety in 1988. It was also a pioneer in voluntary welfare organization to provide opportunities for training of social work undergraduates from University of Malaya.

=== Founding of the Singapore Association for Retarded Children ===
During the 1960s, Singapore Children's Society founded the Singapore Association for Retarded Children. That same year, the Society also opened the Social Work Service office in Toa Payoh.

=== Additional programmes ===
Recognising a social trend towards dual income families, Singapore Children's Society launched a pilot project that reached out to latchkey children in 1979. In 1982 and 1984, the United Nations Association of Singapore awarded Children's Society the "Most Outstanding Civic Organisation" Gold Award.

The year 1984 also saw Singapore Children's Society launch Tinkle Friend, a hotline dedicated to children aged between 7 and 12 for them to voice out their problems. Four years later, in 1988, the Society initiated and developed voluntary services for the prevention of child abuse. The Child Abuse and Neglect Prevention Standing Committee (CANPSC) was formed to provide guidance and direction for the work undertaken. The CANPSC was subsequently renamed to Research and Advocacy Research Committee in 2003.

In the 1990s, a series of developments took place that led to the opening of a Family Service Centre and the establishment of a Research Grant for Social Work.

== Awards ==
- "Most Outstanding Civic Organisation" Gold Award by United Nations Association of Singapore in 1982
- "Most Outstanding Civic Organisation" Gold Award by United Nations Association of Singapore in 1984

== Volunteer work ==
- Telephone Counsellor
- Tutoring
- Mentoring
- Share-a-skill
- Fundraising

== Financial Reporting ==
According to the 2016 Annual Report, the Society had $48,664,394 in cash and cash equivalents. The Society's operating expenses exceed $17 million a year. Employee Benefits Expenses totalled $10,419,015 in 2016. In the same year, Administration expenses were $42,261, Fundraising Expenses were $33,933.
