= Ida Mabel Murray Simmons =

British nurse (1881/82/88–1958)

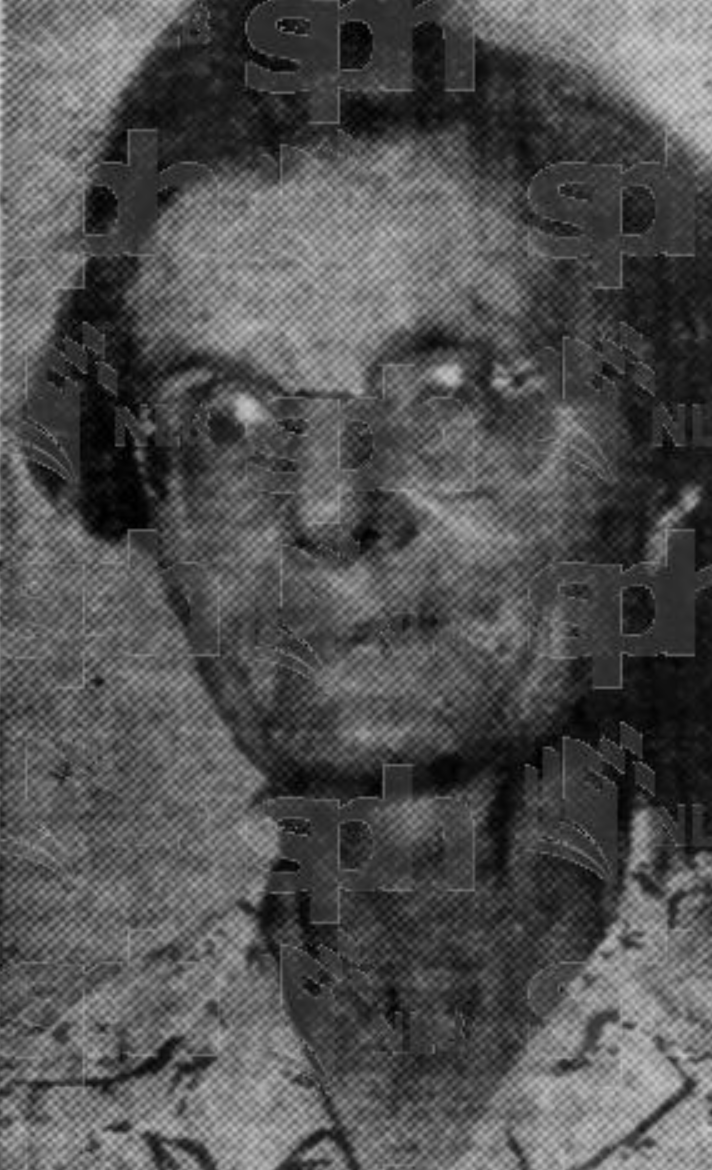
Ida Simmons in 1948

Ida Mabel Murray Simmons MBE (1881, 1882 or 1888 — 7 January 1958), was a public health nurse who greatly improved maternal and infant health care standards in Singapore. She was posthumously inducted into the Singapore Women's Hall of Fame in 2021.

== Early life and education ==
Simmons studied in Eastbourne, East Sussex. She joined the Voluntary Aid Detachment (VAD) during World War I, serving at the 2nd London General Hospital, Chelsea from October 1916, later going to France. She returned in April 1919 and was awarded two red stripes in connection with this service.

After the war, she received a VAD scholarship to study at the Royal Infirmary of Edinburgh, and received her certification in 1922. She then won a scholarship one-year International Red Cross public health course in London.

== Career ==
From 1924 to 1926, she worked as a sister tutor at the Royal Edinburgh Infirmary.

She joined the Straits Settlements Medical Department in December 1926, and arrived in Singapore in January 1927, and became the first Health Sister in Singapore. She was responsible for introducing infant and maternal health services in rural Singapore, which then covered about half of the island, and had a population of about 100,000. She spent several months learning Malay before she began visiting every village in rural Singapore. The improvement of reporting of births and the examination of infants was made a priority.

During her first year, a mobile dispensary was launched by the health department. The dispensary had a doctor and a dresser who spoke several languages. The dispensary would park along the road while Simmons and her team made house calls. In 1930, Simmons began setting up welfare centres which focused on health education and disease and illness prevention. The centres also provided regular check-ups, free milk, referrals to hospitals, lectures and counselling. However, due the lack of facilities and nursing staff, the centres were initially set up in former shophouses, coolie lines and police stations, and only operated for short hours daily.

Simmons was promoted to Public Health Matron for rural Singapore in 1934 and was made a Member of the Order of the British Empire in 1941. Following the end of the Japanese occupation of Singapore, Simmons was tasked with the rebuilding of infant health services, which were neglected under the occupation. Simmons retired in 1948 but in 1950, she travelled to Brunei as part of a World Health Organization programme teaching modern obstetrical methods to rural midwives.

She was posthumously inducted into the Singapore Women's Hall of Fame in 2021.

== Personal life and death ==
During World War II, Simmons was interned at the Sime Road Camp. She passed time by sewing trousers for male internees at the camp, and had sewn 3,000 pairs of trousers by the end of her internment.

Simmons returned to England following her retirement in 1948, and later moved to Scotland. Simmons died on 7 January 1958.
