= Constance Singam =

Singaporean activist and writer (born 1936)

- Born: Constance D'Cruz; 1936 (age 89–90); Singapore
- Education: Monash University (BA); Curtin University (MA)
- Occupations: Writer, activist

Constance Singam (born D'Cruz in 1936) is a Singaporean activist and writer. Singam's career as an activist started later in life, when she was widowed. She earned a degree and became active in women's rights group, AWARE, which she was president of for 3 separate terms. Singam was also involved in other groups in Singapore and later, wrote about her many experiences. Singam was inducted into the Singapore Women's Hall of Fame in 2015.

== Biography ==
Singam was born in Singapore as Constance D'Cruz on 1936. At age five, she and her family went to visit family in Kerala but stayed until 1948 because of the Japanese occupation of Singapore.

Singam married journalist, N.T.R. Singam, at age 24 and was widowed by 42. She became more independent after her husband died, getting a driver's license and earning an honours degree in literature. She went to Melbourne to study literature and returned to Singapore in 1984, having earned a Master of Arts from Curtin University.

Singam joined AWARE in 1986. Singam served as president of AWARE for three different terms, from 1987 to 1989, 1994 to 1996 and lastly from 2007 to 2009. In 1990, she was elected as president of the Singapore Council of Women's Organisations (SCWO). She was active in creating the Society Against Family Violence (SAFV) in 1991. In 1998, she was active in forming The Working Committee (TWC) which supported activism in Singapore. In 2002, Singam started a group that later became called Transient Workers Count Too (TWC2), which worked to help foreign workers in Singapore. TWC3 was started in 2014 in order to recognize Singapore's activists. These awards were called the Singapore Advocacy Awards.

In 2015, Singam was inducted into the Singapore Women's Hall of Fame.

== Work ==
Singam's memoir, Where I Was: A Memoir From the Margins (2013) describes her life living in Singapore as part of many intersecting marginalized groups. Her 2016 book, Never Leave Home Without Your Chilli Sauce celebrates Singapore's cuisine and culture. Singam was a co-editor of The Art of Advocacy in Singapore (2017).
