= Janet Lim =

Hong Kong–Singaporean writer (1923–2014)

Janet Lim Chiu Mei
- 林秋美
- Janet Lim Chiu Mei
- Born: Kwek Chiu Mei; July 14, 1923; British Hong Kong
- Died: August 5, 2014 (aged 91); Brisbane, Australia
- Other name: Lim-Strang Chiu Mei
- Education: Church of England Zenana Missionary School
- Occupations: Writer; nurse
- Years active: 1940–1959
- Employer: St Andrew’s Mission Hospital
- Known for: First Singapore nurse
- Notable work: Sold for Silver (1958)
- Spouse: Errol Strang (m. 1959; died 2002)
- Children: 3 children

Janet Lim Chiu Mei (Chinese: 林秋美; pinyin: Lín Qiūměi) (née Kwek; July 14, c. 1923 – August 5, 2014) was a writer in Singapore. She was the first Asian hospital matron there.

== Background ==
She was born in Hong Kong and grew up in Guangdong province in China. Her father died when she was young and her mother remarried. When the family ran into financial difficulties, she was sold as a mui tsai (domestic servant). She was sent to Singapore during the 1930s and resold there to a rich man who made unwanted advances on her. In 1933, Singapore banned the import of mui tsais and required registration for existing ones; she was able to prove that she was suffering ill treatment and she was placed in an orphanage for girls run by Po Leung Kuk. In 1934, she began attending the Church of England Zenana Missionary School.

In 1940, she began training as a nurse at St Andrew’s Mission Hospital and qualified as a nurse the following year. She was also adopted by a Christian family at this time. She began working as a nurse but fled in 1942 when the Japanese occupied Singapore. The ship she was on sank, and she was rescued by fishermen but then recaptured by the Japanese in Sumatra and held captive. After the war, in 1948, she returned to St Andrew’s Mission Hospital. In 1951, she became the first nurse from Singapore to study in Britain and returned to Singapore a year later as the state registered nurse. In 1954, she became a matron at St Andrew's Mission Hospital.

In 1958, her autobiography Sold for Silver was published, becoming the first English book written by a woman from Singapore.

She left the hospital in 1959 to marry Errol J. Strang, a missionary doctor from Australia. The couple moved first to Kuala Lumpur, then to Hong Kong, and settled in Australia in the 1960s, raising three children.

Her husband Errol Strang died in 2002. In March 2014, she was inducted into the Singapore Women's Hall of Fame. She died five months later in Brisbane on August 5, 2014.
