= Janet Yee =

Singaporean social worker (1934–2019)

- Born: 1934; Singapore
- Died: October 25, 2019 (aged 84–85)
- Known for: Social work and children's rights advocacy
- Notable work: Community social work

Janet Yee (1934 – 25 October 2019) was a Singaporean woman involved in social work and advocacy of children's rights. She played a leading role in getting the abandoned children their rights as citizens of Singapore. She was one of 11 women inducted to Singapore Women's Hall of Fame in 2015.

== Biography ==
Janet Yee was born in Singapore in 1934. Her father was a clerk and mother a housewife, and she was the oldest of their five children. She attended the Paya Lebar Methodist Girls' School, where she took keen interest in sports, and was head prefect. In 1958, when she sought scholarship to pursue studies in the field of medical social work she could not do so due to gender bias. However, after she got married she pursued her studies for two years at the University of Malaya and obtained a diploma in social studies.

== Career ==
Yee started her career in social work as an Assistance Youth Officer in Social Welfare Department in 1956 (1955 is also mentioned) working for social work among abandoned children and poor families; abandoned children without any rights were a common sight in Singapore in the 1960s. To further her social work she founded the Girls’ Club and the Development of Boys’ Club for juvenile delinquents.

In 1985, Yee was responsible in creating a “ground-up” initiative in the Parent Education Programme (PEP) and Family Week, which were the first of its kind in the field of social service, and which are continuing their operations. An achievement to Yee's credit is in restoring back the constitutional rights of the abandoned children to eliminate any bias towards such children; this meant removal of the mention of the term "Abandoned" in their adoption certificates. Yee rose in her professional career to the rank of Deputy Director of Social Welfare in 1983, was chairman of Parent Education Programme in 1985, and then Deputy Director (Family Services Division) in charge of 11 welfare institutions, including homes for boys and children.

Yee was member of the Singapore Council of Women's Organizations (SCWO) set up to create a campaign to protest about violence against women. As chairperson of SCWO and ASEAN Confederation of Women's Organisation (ACWO) from 1988 to 1990, she brought to focus women's issues related to their rights, and raised funds to carry out a survey to assess the housing problems of women and girls. She was also the president of the Singapore Association of Social Workers (SASW) in 1992.

Yee was involved with social work and was a member of the Board of Visitors (BOV) for Destitute Homes, and on the "Medifund committee" of the Singapore General Hospital (SGH).
