= Agnes Fong Sock Har =

Singaporean military officer

- Born: 1946 (age 79–80)
- Military career
- Allegiance: Singapore
- Branch: Singapore Army
- Service years: 1967 - 1992 (25+ years)
- Rank: Major
- Commands: 1st Air Supply Base
- Awards: Singapore Women's Hall of Fame

Agnes Fong Sock Har (born 1946) is a Singaporean former military officer. She was the first woman to hold the appointment of a commanding officer in the Singapore Armed Forces (SAF) when she took command of the first Air Supply Base in 1979.

== Military career ==
In 1967, Fong was working as a clerk at the Ministry of Defence when the first batch of recruits were called up for conscription (National Service). Along with Nancy Tan Soo Keow and Patricia Koh Kim Toh (both of whom later served with the Singapore Police Force), Fong voluntarily signed up for military service and was commissioned as an officer later that year after completing an officer cadet course. In an interview with Pioneer, a publication by the Singapore Armed Forces, Fong said: "The early years were particularly frustrating. I was working in various logistics departments then. A few other women officers joined me later but we felt we were not contributing to the nation as much as we could. Nobody trusted women much those days and we were assigned unimportant tasks that were quite irrelevant to an officer's grooming."

Fong, then holding the rank of Captain, made history in 1979 when she was made Commanding Officer of the 1st Air Supply Base. It was the first time in Singaporean history when a woman was appointed as a commanding officer. When asked about how she felt, she replied, "I'll try hard to respond to the challenge. After all, I've more than my own future prospects to lose. This the first time they're putting a woman to such a major test." After her appointment, she was given more opportunities to develop her analytical and leadership skills. By the time she retired, Fong had been promoted to the rank of Major.

Fong was inducted into the Singapore Women's Hall of Fame in 2014. The Singapore Women's Hall of Fame was launched in 2005 to honour some of Singapore's pioneering women activists, educators and philanthropists.
