= Movement for the Intellectually Disabled of Singapore =

Singapore voluntary welfare organisation

Movement for the Intellectually Disabled of Singapore (MINDS)
- Type: Nonprofit
- Founded: May 1962
- Headquarters: 800 Margaret Drive; Singapore 149307
- Key people: Chairman: Mr Geoffrey Ong; Chief Executive Officer: Mr Kelvin Koh
- Website: www.minds.org.sg

Movement for the Intellectually Disabled of Singapore (MINDS) is a voluntary welfare organisation based in Singapore, that provides services for the intellectually disabled. MINDS was founded in 1962, and remains one of the largest charities in Singapore. Over 600 staff and 2,400 beneficiaries are a part of MINDS. Two other organisations, the Association for Persons with Special Needs and Metta School were formed as an offshoot of MINDS.

== History ==
In 1960, the Singapore Children's Society initiated several educational and training programmes for intellectually disabled children, leading to the formation of the Singapore Association for Retarded Children (SARC) in 1962. Medical social worker Daisy Vaithilingam was involved in the creation of the group. Along with Vaithliningam, other participants in the creation of MINDS were Warren Fox, Ena Aeria, and Freda Paul. After running the pilot project with the go-ahead of the Singapore Children's Society, they applied for funding from the Rotary Club and received a grant of $10,000.

Beginning with only two teachers and 26 students in a single classroom in Towner Road, the new association rapidly expanded over the 1960s, building special schools at Margaret Drive and Jurong, a sheltered workshop at Geylang, a residential home at Tampines as well as their main administration centre, Lee Kong Chian Centre. SARC started a subcommittee for services for those with less severe intellectual disabilities in 1971 and a youth volunteering group the year after; the subcommittee was split into an independent organisation, the Association for the Educationally Subnormal (AESN), in 1976. In 1983 SARC launched the first early intervention programme in Singapore, prompting other organisations to follow suit and set up an adjunct subcommittee that became Special Olympics Singapore.

Since the term "retarded" had acquired negative connotations and the organisation had started services for adults, SARC changed their name to the Movement for the Intellectually Disabled of Singapore (MINDS) in 1985. In 1987, the organisation benefitted by being primarily funded from The Community Chest of Singapore, and in 1993 MINDS became the largest voluntary welfare organisation in Singapore, with AESN in second place. Relocation of the MINDS special schools, from premises of closed-down primary schools to new buildings with customised facilities, began in 1998. The association started their first social enterprise, a car washing service along Pasir Panjang Road, in 2001. Their residential homes and training centres were merged into the MINDSville@Napiri centre, which opened in 2007, and the relocation programme was completed two years later.

They run four special schools and a centre called MINDSville@Napiri which offers therapy and residential care. Other MINDS services include sheltered workshops, social enterprises, and day activity centre. MINDS generates yearly expenses of 21 million Singapore dollars, as of 2005. In 2022, MINDS opened the Minds Hub (Central) on Queens Road to provide a variety of services.

== Activities ==
MINDS operates four special schools for intellectually disabled students between the ages of 4 and 18. These schools provide life skills training, such as personal grooming and money management, as well as exposure to common tasks through outings. Students receive physiotherapy, pre-vocational training, and basic instruction in mainstream academic subjects, like languages, mathematics, art, and science. MINDS also offers sheltered workshops where individuals are trained for simple sorting and packing jobs and helps connect them with potential employers.

The MINDS Trusteeship Scheme allows parents of intellectually disabled individuals to deposit savings into a trust account, overseen by a public trustee. After the parents die, MINDS ensures the funds are used for the beneficiary's caregiving. Other services provided by MINDS include counseling, behavior therapy, and rehabilitation, which are primarily offered at their integrated service center, MINDSville@Napiri. The center houses a nursing home for adults with high support needs, a home for intellectually disabled children from broken families, and a hostel for clients who require less-intensive care.

Additionally, the MINDS Youth Group consists of volunteers who conduct weekly educational, social, and recreational activities for approximately 170 intellectually disabled individuals.

== Awards ==
MINDS has won several awards, including the 2001 President's Social Service Award from the National Council of Social Service and the 2010 Singapore Health Award (Gold) by the Health Promotion Board.

== Management ==
The organisation is headed by Chairman Geoffrey Ong and chief executive officer Kelvin Koh, who lead a 15-member executive committee with 10 subcommittees that meet monthly to discuss problems and plan new programmes.

To support events and advocate for the inclusion of People with Intellectual Disability (PWIDs), MINDS is supported by over 4000 volunteers, including corporate and non-corporate members.
