= Julie Tan (activist) =

Singaporean activist (1930–1995)

Julie Tan Eng Poh (1930 – June 17, 1995) was a women's rights activist in Singapore who served as the founding president of the Singapore Council of Women's Organisations.

== Biography ==
Julie Tan was born in 1930 and was trained as a lawyer. She is known for her role as a leading women's rights activist in Singapore.

Tan began her activism by volunteering with the Young Women's Christian Association in Singapore. She then was elected to serve as president of the organization from 1972 to 1976 and subsequently from 1978 to 1982, the longest-serving leader in its history. As president, her work included efforts to support working mothers, such as through the foundation of the first YWCA day care in Singapore in 1977. She went on to serve on the executive council of the World YWCA.

In 1980, she co-founded the Singapore Council of Women's Organisations, serving as its first president from 1980 to 1982. The organization aimed to represent the breadth of women's groups in the country and jointly support women's economic independence. She also spearheaded the foundation of the D.E.W. Credit Cooperative, Singapore's first and only credit union specifically aimed at empowering women, in 1981. She served as president of the credit union until her death.

Tan was appointed a justice of the peace in 1989. Her other volunteer work included serving on the National Advisory Board for the Disabled and advocating for the rights of elderly women.

She died of lung cancer in 1995 at age 65. In 2014, she was inducted into the Singapore Women's Hall of Fame "because of her tireless work to see to it that women in Singapore receive the same opportunities as the men."
