= Ruth Wong =

Singaporean educator (1918–1982)

Ruth Wong Hie King (10 June 1918 - 1 February 1982) was a pioneer educator who transformed teacher training in Singapore, and was the first female principal of the Teachers’ Training College and the founding director of the National Institute of Education, then known as the Institute of Education. Wong was inducted into the Singapore Women's Hall of Fame in 2014.

== Early life ==
Wong was born in Singapore on 10 June 1918 to Wong Kai Seng, a lay preacher and tailor, and Lau Hee Duang, both of whom were from Fuzhou. She attended the Methodist Girls' School from 1924 to 1934. After successfully completing her Senior Cambridge examinations in 1935, she refused a scholarship to study overseas, as the Great Depression had greatly affected her father's business, and she instead taught in a private school for $26 a month to help support her family. She then enrolled in an arts course in Raffles College, which later led to a teacher training programme. She studied in the school from 1935-1939, gaining a Diploma of Arts and a Diploma of Education. Wong continued her occupation as a teacher during the Japanese Occupation of Singapore in WWII. She taught at various schools, including the Anglo-Chinese School.

In 1951, Wong received a scholarship to study at the Queen's University Belfast in Belfast, Northern Ireland, where she studied until 1954, when she graduated with a Bachelor of Arts and an honours degree in mathematics. She was awarded a Fulbright Scholarship in 1960 to be a Testing Associate at the Educational Testing Service of Princeton. She attended Harvard University and completed her Masters and Doctorate in Education in 1962.

== Career ==
Following her return to Singapore, Wong was appointed the head of the mathematics department of the Teachers' Training College in 1955, a role she held until 1957, when she was seconded to the School of Education as a lecturer. She then became a senior lecturer of the University of Malaya until 1962. In May 1963, she was appointed the head of the School of Education in the University of Malaya in Kuala Lumpur. She was made the dean of the university in July 1965. However, Wong left the school in 1968.

Wong was appointed the director of research at the Ministry of Education on 25 June 1969.

=== Restructuring teacher training ===
In 1971, Wong became the first female principal of Teachers' Training College. Following her appointment as principal, she restructured the training curriculum, introducing a new curriculum which addressed a teacher’s professional competence and the student’s personal growth in an integrated manner. Project work was also introduced to reduce the stress of the students, and to give student-teachers experience with research. Under her leadership, the college only began accepting those with a Higher School Certificate for the Certificate in Education programme, and only university graduates were accepting into the Certificate in Education programme, to improve the quality of teaching.

In 1973, following the college's merger with the MOE Research Unit to form the Institute of Education, she became the director of the new institute. Wong implemented an initiative where experimental or demonstration schools would be established to test new pedagogical ideas and practices in 1974. In April 1975, she initiated in-service courses on educational evaluation for primary school teachers to allow them to "continually upgrade themselves".

=== Counselling ===
Wong advocated for the inclusion of counselling and guidance in schools, with the Guidance Clinic and the Remedial Reading Clinic being established in the Institute of Education in 1974.

== Personal life ==
Wong retired in September 1976 for health reasons, although she became a part-time student counsellor at the National University of Singapore in October 1977. Wong died on 1 February 1982 due to bronchial pneumonia.

== Legacy ==
An annual lecture commemorating Wong was first given in 1983. She was inducted into the Singapore Women's Hall of Fame in 2014.
