= Esther Tan =

Singaporean adventure racing athlete (born 1975)

- Born: 1975 (age 50–51); Singapore
- Education: Nanyang Technological University (BEng)
- Military career
- Allegiance: Singapore
- Branch: Republic of Singapore Navy
- Service years: 2001–2017
- Rank: Major
- Unit: Naval Diving Unit

Esther Tan
- Chinese: 譚承茵
Transcriptions
Standard Mandarin
- Hanyu Pinyin: Tán Chéngyīn
Southern Min
- Hokkien POJ: Tâⁿ Sêng-in

Esther Tan Cheng Yin (Chinese: 譚承茵; pinyin: Tán Chéngyīn; born 1975) is a Singaporean former naval diver and adventure racing athlete who was the first woman to serve in the Naval Diving Unit (NDU). She retired from the Republic of Singapore Navy (RSN) in 2017, with the rank Major.

As Singapore's first female naval diver and an inductee of the Singapore Women's Hall of Fame, she has been called "Singapore's G.I. Jane".

== Naval career ==
Tan was educated at Victoria Junior College and studied electrical and electronic engineering at the Nanyang Technological University.

She enlisted to the Republic of Singapore Navy (RSN) in 1995, and joined the Naval Diving Unit (NDU) in 2000, becoming Singapore's first female naval diver. As a naval diver, she specialised in search-and-rescue missions and explosive ordnance disposal. The search-and-rescue operations in which Tan was involved included the recovery of missing sailors after the RSS Courageous collided with a container ship in 2003. She retired from the Navy after 22 years of service in 2017, having held the rank of Major.

== Adventure racing ==
Tan started competing in adventure racing while she was a university student and has since taken part in dozens of international adventure races including marathons, triathlons and Ironman Triathlons.

In 2006, she competed in the 700 km (430 mi) XPD Adventure Race in Tasmania, in which she slept for 29 hours over the 10-day race. In the 2007 Singapore Ironman 70.3 Triathlon, she was the top finishing Singaporean woman, and she was the only woman in the Asian team at the 2007 Adventure Racing World Series in Scotland, which covered 500 kilometres (310 mi). She was also in the overall champion team in the Ace Adventure Race and the Safra Adventure Race in 2007. In 2008, she finished first in the Women's Open of the Ironman 70.3 event in the Desaru Pengerang International Long Distance Triathlon.

Tan climbed Mount Everest in 2011; she did not summit, turning back 100 metres (330 ft) before the summit due to bad weather.

== Honours ==
Tan was inducted into the Singapore Women's Hall of Fame in 2014. She was named a Her World Young Woman Achiever in 2006 and one of The Singapore Women's Weekly's "Great Women of Our Time" in 2017.
