= Singapore Council of Women's Organisations =

The Singapore Council of Women's Organisations (SCWO) is an umbrella organisation founded in 1980 in order to coordinate the efforts of women's groups in Singapore. The organisation represents many diverse women's groups and advocates for women's rights in the country. SCWO is also responsible for the Singapore Women's Hall of Fame, provides workshops and other events in Singapore.

== About ==
The SCWO works in several different areas to represent the interests of women in Singapore and to coordinate the efforts of the various different women's groups it represents. This umbrella organisation also helps to support government policies in Singapore. It has advocated for change in women's rights in the country. The scope of SCWO is broad and encompasses diverse women's groups and viewpoints. Other things that SCWO is involved in includes providing workshops and training. It runs a thrift store, opened in 2000, called New2U. SCWO also celebrates International Women's Day and has created the Singapore Women's Hall of Fame.

== History ==
The SCWO had its roots in the late 1970s, when activists began to feel a need for an umbrella organisation for women's groups in Singapore. Caroline Lam was one of the first women to suggest creating such an organisation in 1978 and in November of that year, a meeting took place to consider different names. The first temporary committee was made up of Lam, Julie Tan, Anaman Tan, Seow Peck Leng, Maureen Tan, and Mary Ho. This group of women created a constitution for the proposed group and sent this to 24 different women's organisations in October of 1979. SCWO was formally founded in 1980 and was a "government-sanctioned" group. The first president of the group was Julie Tan. By 1999, the group represented 38 different women's organisations and had 94,000 members. In 2019, there were more than 50 groups and more than 500,000 women represented by SCWO.

== Notable members ==
- Julie Tan, founding president
- Constance Singam, served as president.
