= Cynthia Goh =

Pioneer of palliative care in Singapore (1949–2022)

Cynthia Goh (21 November 1949 – 13 February 2022) was a pioneer of palliative care in Singapore. She served as the chairman of the Singapore Hospice Council and the co-chairman of the Worldwide Hospice Palliative Care Alliance, and was inducted into the Singapore Women's Hall of Fame in 2014.

== Early life and education ==
Goh was born on 21 November 1949 in Hong Kong, to a family of doctors. She went to London to study in St. Bartholomew's Hospital, University of London, where she met her future husband, Dr. Goh Hak-Su, in 1969, and graduated in 1974. She trained as a specialist in internal medicine.

== Medical career ==
After moving to Singapore, Goh began working as a volunteer doctor at the St. Joseph's Home and Hospice in 1986. Under the Singapore Cancer Society, several volunteers, including Goh, began a hospice home care service, and formed HCA Hospice Care in 1989. She served as the chairman of the Singapore Hospice Council. Goh helped set up palliative care services at the Singapore General Hospital and the Singapore National Cancer Centre in 1999. She also served as the National Cancer Centre's head.

Goh was appointed the co-head of the Worldwide Hospice Palliative Care Alliance on 27 May 2009. Later that year, she was appointed the chairman of the Asia Pacific Hospice Palliative Care Network, but moved to the advisory chair position in 2021. She was also the centre director for the Lien Centre for Palliative Care.

Goh was inducted into the Singapore Women's Hall of Fame in 2014 for her contributions to palliative care in Singapore.

== Personal life ==
Goh married in 1974 and gave birth to a daughter and a son. In 1981, she and her family moved to Singapore,

In November 2019, Goh was diagnosed with pancreatic cancer, and underwent surgery and chemotherapy till May 2020. In August 2021, a lump was found in her lung, and she underwent surgery to remove it. However, by then, the cancer had spread to other parts of her body. In January 2022, she asked for several of her colleagues to assist her with pain management due to her cancer.

Goh died on 13 February 2022 in her house.
