= Geraldene Lowe-Ismail =

Singaporean tour guide and writer

Lowe-Ismail in 2014.

Geraldene Lowe-Ismail (1938 – 17 February 2025) was a pioneering Singaporean tour guide and writer. She was involved in the founding of the Singapore Heritage Society and was the author of Chinatown Memories. She received the Lifetime Achievement Award for Outstanding Contribution to Tourism.

== Early life and education ==
Lowe-Ismail was born in Singapore in 1938. Both her parents were of Eurasian descent and she was an only child. The family lived in Katong. Before the Japanese occupied Singapore in 1942, she and her mother evacuated to Australia, where she spent the war years. After the end of the occupation in 1945, they returned to Singapore, though as schools had yet to reopen her parents then sent her to attend a boarding school in Australia. She returned to Singapore in 1955 and trained to become a secretary.

== Career ==
Lowe-Ismail initially worked for Air India. She was hired by the newly-established trading agency of trading firm Anglo-French in 1957. In the early 1960s, she left for Italy as she wished to learn to speak Italian. While there, she worked at a hotel and then as a tour guide. After returning to Singapore, Lowe-Ismail began working for Carrier Singapore's newly established travel agency. In 1965, she was tasked with helping establish a 50-week tour guide training programme, which remained in use as of 2018. She was the first to conduct walking tours in Singapore.

After marrying in 1967, Lowe-Ismail resigned from the travel agency and instead became a freelance tour guide. She reportedly assisted in visits by foreign dignitaries as she could speak Italian, Spanish and a limited amount of French in addition to English and Malay. She also aided filmmakers and photographers with locations and props. She claimed to organise tours to "ethnic areas" and local heritage spots as she was frustrated with how "most visitors only go to the 'tourist spots' and did not get to experience the real Singapore." Lowe-Ismail often organised tours involving local festivals, being the first to organise tours involving local Thaipusam celebrations. Mothership wrote that reasons for her tours' popularity included them being "detail-oriented" and the inclusion of locations which were on private property, which she had gained access as she was "on friendly terms" with the tenants. Her tours were included in travel guides by Lonely Planet, Frommer's and Fodor's. Mothership also reported that a "well-known" diplomat had once called her the "oldest streetwalker in Singapore."

Lowe-Ismail was eventually appointed the president of the Registered Tourist Guides Association of Singapore on its founding. In the 1980s, she was involved in the setting up of the Singapore Heritage Society. Her guidebook and memoir on Chinatown, titled Chinatown Memories, was published by the Singapore Heritage Society with a grant from the Singapore Tourism Board. It was launched at the Singapore Art Museum in 1999. In 2002, the book was translated into Chinese by the Kreta Ayer Community Centre's Collectable Society and launched by Member of Parliament Lily Neo.

Lowe-Ismail retired in September 2013 as her age was "catching up." She received the Lifetime Achievement for Outstanding Contribution to Tourism from Prime Minister Lee Hsien Loong at the 2014 Singapore Experience Awards. In 2018, she was inducted into the Singapore Women's Hall of Fame.

== Personal life and death ==
Lowe-Ismail married Ismail Ahmad, a civil servant with whom she had three children, in 1967. In 1985, her family moved to Australia while she remained in Singapore. After retiring, she moved to Australia to be closer with her family. In her later years, Lowe-Ismail suffered from dementia among other ailments and lived in a nursing home in Perth. She died on 17 February 2025, after which she was buried next to her husband and her daughter.
