= Khatijun Nissa Siraj =

Singaporean women's rights activist (1925–2023)

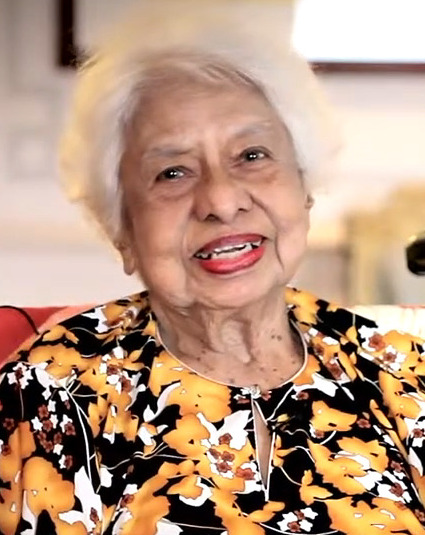
- Siraj in 2014
- Born: 1925
- Died: 7 March 2023 (aged 97)
- Occupation: Women's rights activist

Khatijun Nissa Siraj (1925 – 7 March 2023) was a Singporean women's rights activist and the co-founder of the Young Women Muslim Association of Singapore (PPIS) and the Muslim Women's Welfare Council. In response to an epidemic within the Singaporean Muslim community of women being abandoned by their husbands through inexpensive, informal divorces, Siraj and the PPIS successfully pressed for the formation of a Syariah Court. Siraj was the first case worker for the court, which had authority over marriages and divorces. In addition to her work with the PPIS, Siraj worked with a number of other organizations that worked to improve women's welfare. She was mother to law professor Mehrun Siraj (1945-2021) and grandmother to actor-director Huzir Sulaiman (b. 1973).

== Early life ==
Khatijun Nissa Siraj was born in 1925, the daughter of a wealthy businessman of Indian descent. Before becoming an activist, Siraj spent her time as a volunteer at the St. Andrew's Mission Hospital and as a member of the management committees of the Singapore Children's Society and the Family Planning Association. Siraj was often the only Muslim woman on the committees that she sat on, which led her to fear that there was no one looking out for the interests of Muslim women.

== Activism ==
During the 1950s, the divorce rate within the Singaporean Muslim community was almost 80 percent. Men were able to divorce their wives by paying $90 over three months, and needed only to verbally state that they wanted a divorce; they were then free to remarry immediately. Women did not have a say in whether or not they wanted a divorce, and there was no requirement that the wife be informed of the impending divorce before it took place. Additionally, polygamy and child marriage were still legal, and there were few legal protections against domestic abuse.

In 1952, Siraj and 21 other Muslim women from a diversity of ethnic groups co-founded the Young Women's Muslim Association, or Persatuan Permudi Islam Singapura (PPIS). The group originally spread by word-of-mouth, and some members joined even though they had reason to fear that their husbands would leave them if they became involved in the group. The organization pressed lawmakers to create better legal protection for women. Their legislative victories included the outlawing of polygamy and the formation of a Syariah Court in November 1958; Siraj was the court's first caseworker. The court had jurisdiction over marriage and divorce, could order husbands to pay alimony, and before polygamy was outlawed, could force a husband to secure his first wife's consent before marrying a second wife. The book Our Lives to Live: Putting a Woman's Face to Change in Singapore credits Siraj, Che Zahara binte Noor Mohamed, and Shirin Fozdar as the main forces behind the court's formation.

In 1961, the Women's Charter, a significant piece of legislation for women's rights, was passed. Despite the passage of the Charter, and improvements to divorce and polygamy laws, women in the community were in need of social services. In 1964, Siraj founded the Muslim Women's Welfare Council, which provided women with legal and medical advice, as well as charitable aid.

In 2014, Khatijun Nissa Siraj was recognized for her social and advocacy work by the Singapore Council of Women's Organisations, which inducted Siraj into the Singapore Women's Hall of Fame.

== Death ==
Siraj died on 7 March 2023, at the age of 97.
