= May Wong =

Singaporean community and social worker

May Bernice Wong MBE PBM (née Hing;1899 - 1989) was a Singaporean community and social worker. She was president of Singapore's Chinese Women’s Association from 1949 till her death in 1989.

== Biography ==
Wong was born in 1899 in Sacramento, California, the eldest of 16 children.

Wong moved to Hong Kong and then China, followed by Singapore in 1930. She volunteered for the Young Women’s Christian Association, Po Leung Kuk (a home for girls and women) and children's charities. At Po Leung Kuk she helped to train the women in domestic work, sewing, embroidery and childcare. She also organised charity balls and fairs to raise funds for war orphans of China and Great Britain.

In 1941, Wong took a St John Ambulance nursing course and joined the nursing team at a medical centre in Havelock Road. When the sister-in-charge was transferred elsewhere, Wong took over the running of the centre. In February 1942, days before the Japanese invaded Singapore, May and her children left for Australia. She returned after the war, and resumed her charity work. In 1948 she organised the Keppel Harbour Feeding Centre to provide food for hungry children.

In 1978, when May was nearly 80 years old, the Chinese Women's Association (CWA) took over the management of the Henderson Senior Citizens’ Home, a sheltered housing project of the Council of Social Service. Together with CWA treasurer Violet Wong, who was also in her 70s, May supervised the running of the home for the next 11 years.

=== Recognition ===
In 1937 Wong was made a Member of the Order of the British Empire for her contributions to Singapore society. She was awarded the Jubilee Medal for Active War Service by King George VI for her nursing work at the first aid post at Havelock Road. In 1977 she received the Pingat Bakti Masyarakat Award.

In 2003, the May Wong Lifestyle Centre at the Henderson Senior Citizens' Home was opened in her memory.

== Personal life ==
In 1920 she married Wong Shui Kei, a Chinese-born Stanford University graduate who became a banker. They had four children.
