= Karen Tan Puay Kiow =

Colonel in the Singaporean armed forces

Karen Tan Puay Kiow (born 1962) was the first woman to reach the rank of colonel in the Singapore Armed Forces. In 2014 she was inducted into the Singapore Women's Hall of Fame.

Tan retired from the army in 2007 and became general manager of ST Electronics. She is married and has two sons
