= Che Zahara =

Malay activist

Che Zahara binte Noor Mohamed (nicknamed Che Zahara Kaum Ibu; 1907–1962) was a Malay activist who worked towards women's and children's rights in Singapore. She was one of the first Malay women in Singapore to fight for modern women's rights, according to journalist, Hajah Halizah Mohd Som. Che Zahara is the founder of the first Muslim women's welfare organization in Singapore, the Malay Women's Welfare Association (MWWA). Over the course of thirteen years, she "looked after over 300 women and orphans regardless of race or religion." She not only gave people a home, but also taught them religious knowledge and basic economic skills, such as sewing.

== Biography ==
Che Zahara was born into an "illustrious family in Singapore". Her father, Noor Mohamed, was an important man and one of the first Malay people to learn English, which he taught his daughter. Her husband, Alal Mohamed Russull, was an advocate of social welfare and justice. After World War II, she and her husband housed orphans and women in need in their own home, which was located on Desker Road in the middle of the "red-light district."

Che Zahara founded MWWA in October 1947 and used the group to focus on issues surrounding marriage reform. MWWA attracted eighty members, about fifty of which were teachers almost immediately after its founding.

In 1948, she wrote four short plays to be performed as a protest against traditional Malay marriage customs, which included the ability of a man to divorce his wife without legal inquiry. In addition, she fought for husbands to pay alimony to divorced wives until she remarried. Che Zahara also supported the Laycock Marriage Bill which created a minimum age for marriage in Singapore. Another initiative that Che Zahara supported was to encourage women to give blood in order to help the Singapore Hospital meet demands for blood transfusions.

After the Singapore Council of Women (SCW) was founded in 1952, Che Zahara had a "wider network and more resources available to the MWWA." In 1955, she represented Singapore at the World Congress of Mothers in Switzerland. In 1961, Che Zahara, along with the SCW, helped establish the Women's Charter of Singapore.

Che Zahara was inducted into the Singapore Women's Hall of Fame in 2014.
