= Khoo Teh Lynn =

Singaporean fighter pilot

Khoo Teh Lynn (born 1981) is a Singaporean fighter pilot with the Republic of Singapore Air Force (RSAF). She is Singapore's first female fighter pilot and was inducted into the Singapore Women's Hall of Fame in 2014.

== Biography ==
Khoo began flying in 1998 while studying in Raffles Junior College (RJC), when she joined the Singapore Youth Flying Club (SYFC). She earned her private pilot licence in 2000, and joined the Republic of Singapore Air Force (RSAF) the same year.

She later graduated from the University of Southern California in 2010 with a degree in international relations and history.

She completed a Basic Wings Course at the Flying Training Institute in Western Australia and earned her fighter wings in 2003 in France before joining the RSAF fighter fleet as Singapore's first female fighter pilot. She was posted to the 143 Squadron, operating F-16 Fighting Falcon aircraft. She was involved in several overseas exercises including the 2006 Exercise Pitch Black, Exercise Wallaby and Exercise Cope Tiger. She was promoted to the rank of captain in 2007 and later joined the 145 Squadron based at Changi Air Base.

Khoo was inducted into the Singapore Women's Hall of Fame in 2014. She married an RSAF transport pilot in 2011, and their first child was born in 2014.
