= Singapore Flying College =

Flight school in Singapore

Coordinates: 1.3453°N 103.9629°E

- Company type: Subsidiary
- Founded: 1988
- Headquarters: Singapore
- Area served: Singapore
- Owner: Singapore Airlines
- Website: www.sfcpl.com

The Singapore Flying College (Abbreviation: SFC) is a CAAS approved flight school based in Singapore. Established in 1988 under the Singapore Airlines Group, it is the training school for cadet pilots with Singapore Airlines, Scoot and Singapore Airlines Cargo.

The SFC headquarters is located at SIA Training Centre, Singapore, in close proximity to Changi Airport and is where the ATPL ground training phase is conducted.

On successful completion of Ground Training Phase, cadets subsequently move to SFC's other training facility at Jandakot Airport in Perth, Western Australia to continue with their Flight Training for the Multi-crew Pilot License.

Singapore Flying College operated a third training centre at Sunshine Coast Airport, Maroochydore. However, due to changes in pilot training curriculum, it was shut down in March 2014 after operating for twelve years.

Singapore Flying College conducts Multi-Crew Pilot Licence (MPL) courses for Singapore Airlines and Scoot cadets.

== Fleet ==
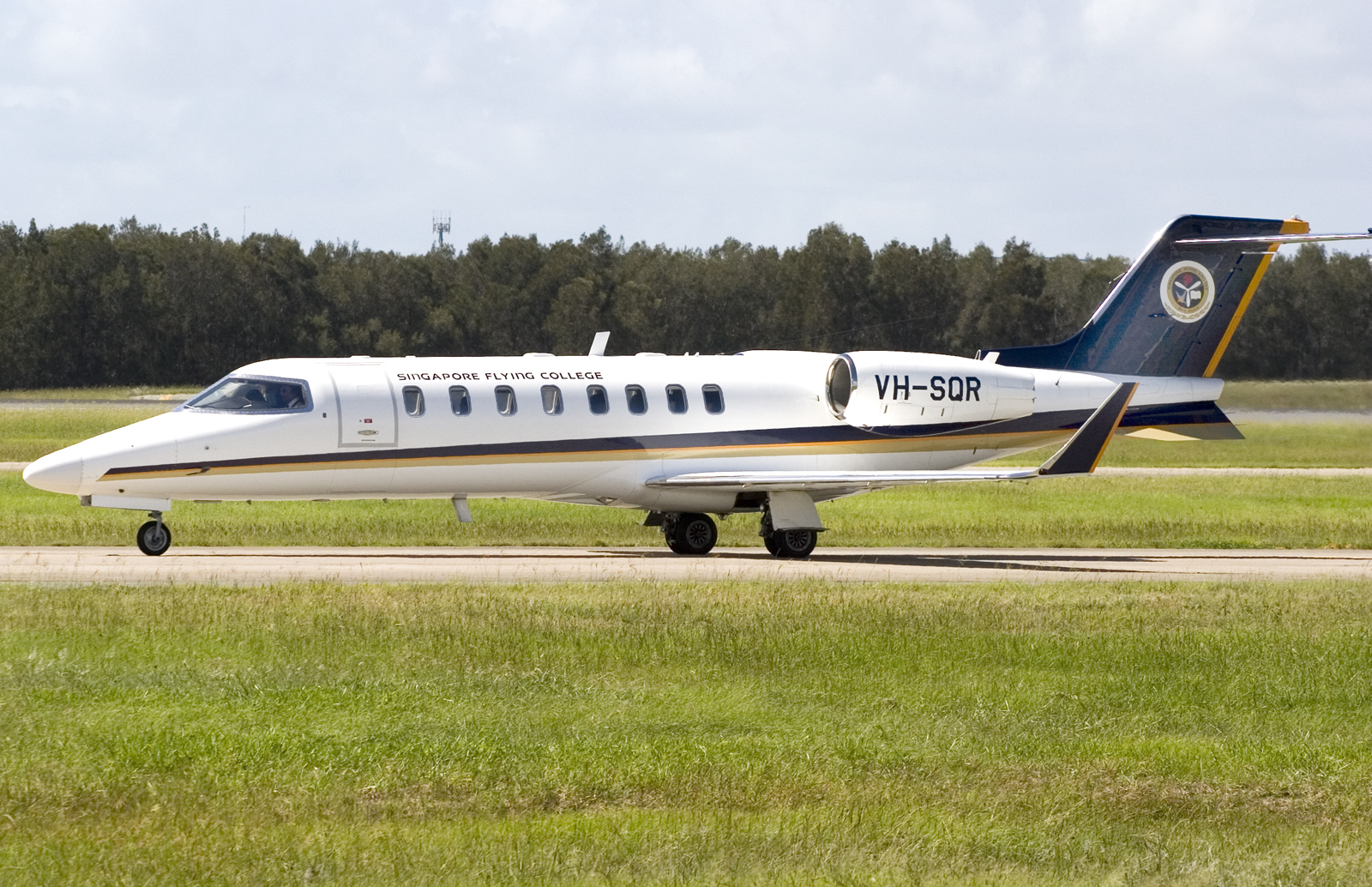
A Singapore Flying College Learjet 45 in 2007

The Singapore Flying College fleet consists of the following aircraft:

Aircraft	Total
Cessna 172S G1000	7
Cessna 172R G1000	9
Piper PA-44 Seminole	2
Simulators	2

SFC uses EFIS-equipped Cessna 172s for primary flight training and the Piper PA-44 Seminole for the multi-engine phase.

Historically, SFC used to operate Cessna 152 aircraft out of Seletar Airport. These were phased out by April 2010 and replaced by the Cessna 172. In Jandakot, cadets used to fly the Beechcraft Bonanza as an interim trainer between the Cessna 172 and Beechcraft Baron phases.

Advanced Flight Training (AFT) was previously conducted on light jets to give cadet pilots an introduction to jet and multi-crew operations.

Initially, the Learjet 31 was based out of Changi Airport. In July 1997, one such plane crashed in Ranong, Thailand, which resulted in the deaths of the cadet and his instructor. This prompted the company to replace it with the Learjet 45, which came equipped with Ground Proximity Warning System. The training base was relocated to Sunshine Coast Airport at Maroochydore in 2002. In 2010, the Learjet 45s were replaced by the Cessna Citation Mustang C510s.

In July 2013, the decision was made by the Singapore Airlines Group to scrap the AFT phase and conduct the Multi-Crew Cooperation/Jet Conversion Course as well as line training in Level-D Simulators at SIA Training Centre instead. All jet trainers have been phased out.
