= Jane Lee (mountaineer) =

Singaporean mountaineer, speaker and writer

Jane Lee Zhen Zhen (born 1984) is a mountaineer and speaker from Singapore. Co-founder and co-team leader of the Singapore Women's Everest Team, Lee is also the first female from Southeast Asia and the 37th woman in history to have scaled the Seven Summits, the highest peaks of the seven continents including Kilimanjaro, Denali, Elbrus, Aconcagua, Vinson and Everest (Chomolungma).

== Education ==
Lee studied at the National University of Singapore, graduating in 2007 with a Bachelor of Arts (English Literature) (Honours).

== Seven Summits ==
After successfully climbing up Mount Everest, Lee targeted the rest of the Seven Summits and promptly quit her former job as a senior executive at Singapore's Republic Polytechnic's Adventure Learning Centre to become a professional full-time mountaineer, securing sponsorships for her climbs from organisations such as MindChamps, a tuition centre company in Singapore, Bank Julius Baer, a Swiss bank, and Khunu, a Himalayan company selling wool of mountain yaks in the Himalayas, at the same time.

In February 2010, Jane Lee successfully reached the peak of Australia's Mount Kosciuszko. Five months later, she climbed up Alaskan mountain McKinley. A year later, Lee ascended four mountains: Antarctica's Mount Vinson in January; Aconcagua in Argentina a month later; the famed Kilimanjaro in Tanzania, Africa, in June; and the Russian Mount Elbrus in July.

During her climbing of the Seven Summits, Lee was plagued by problems such as drastic snow storms, a hard landing on a runway of solid ice on Mount Vinson, experiencing five different weather conditions in Tanzania and having to elude police from Russia on Mount Elbrus, which had been sealed off due to high activity by terror groups.

== Awards ==
The National University of Singapore presented to Lee the Outstanding Young Alumni Award in 2009, in recognition of her achievements. In 2014, Lee and the other members of the Singapore Women's Everest Team were inducted into the Singapore Women's Hall of Fame.

== Personal life ==
Born to Lee Hua Lam, a businessman, and Susan Sng, a sales and operations manager, in 1984, Lee is the second of three children in her household. In an interview with Singapore newspaper my paper, Lee commented on her father, saying, "My dad is a very 'outdoorsy' and adventurous person. Because of his influence, I never went to shopping malls or cinemas." As a fan of reading, Lee enjoys indulging in the works of American author Ayn Rand, one of her favourite writers. Though strict in her personal fitness regime, Lee has admitted in an interview to "eating everything from char kway teow to McDonald's french fries and Hainanese chicken rice". In addition to conducting motivational speeches for business organisations, schools and public groups, Lee blogs on her personal website, janeclimbs.com, and for Straits Times Online Mobile Print, a Singapore webpage meant for citizen journalism.
