= Violet Oon =

Singaporean chef, restaurateur, and food writer

- Born: Violet Oon; 6 May 1949 (age 76); Malacca, Federation of Malaya
- Education: University of Singapore (1971)
- Children: 2
- Culinary career
- Cooking style: Peranakan
- Current restaurant(s): Violet Oon Singapore at Bukit Timah; Violet Oon Singapore at ION Orchard; Violet Oon Singapore at Jewel; National Kitchen by Violet Oon at National Gallery Singapore; Violet Oon Satay Bar & Grill at Clarke Quay
- Previous restaurant(s): Violet Oon's Kitchen at Takashimaya; Violet Oon's Kitchen at Toa Payoh
- Website: violetoon.com

Violet Oon (born 6 May 1949) is a Singaporean chef, restaurateur, and food writer known for her food columns, cookbooks, and restaurants specializing in Peranakan cuisine. She has been the food ambassador of Singapore since 1988.

== Early life ==
Violet Oon was born to Peranakan parents Beng Soon Oon and Nancy Oon in Malacca, Federation of Malaya. Oon spent part of her childhood in London where her father worked as an executive at Royal Dutch Shell. Her family later moved to the Katong neighborhood of Singapore. Although her mother never cooked, Oon began cooking at the age of sixteen with her aunts in an effort to document her family recipes. She attended the University of Singapore (now the National University of Singapore) in 1971.

== Journalism career ==
After graduating from the University of Singapore, Oon was a features and music journalist for the New Nation newspaper. In 1974, she began a food column in New Nation at the request of her then-editor David Kraal. Throughout the 1980s, Oon wrote for The Singapore Monitor. Oon ran a monthly magazine, The Food Paper, from 1987 to 1996.

Oon has written three cookbooks: Peranakan Cooking, Violet Oon Cooks, and A Singapore Family Cookbook, in addition to several other co-authored cookbooks in collaboration with international publishers such as The Peninsula Hotels and Tiger Beer. Her cookbooks were part of a national effort for preserving oral history and national heritage.

== Restaurants ==
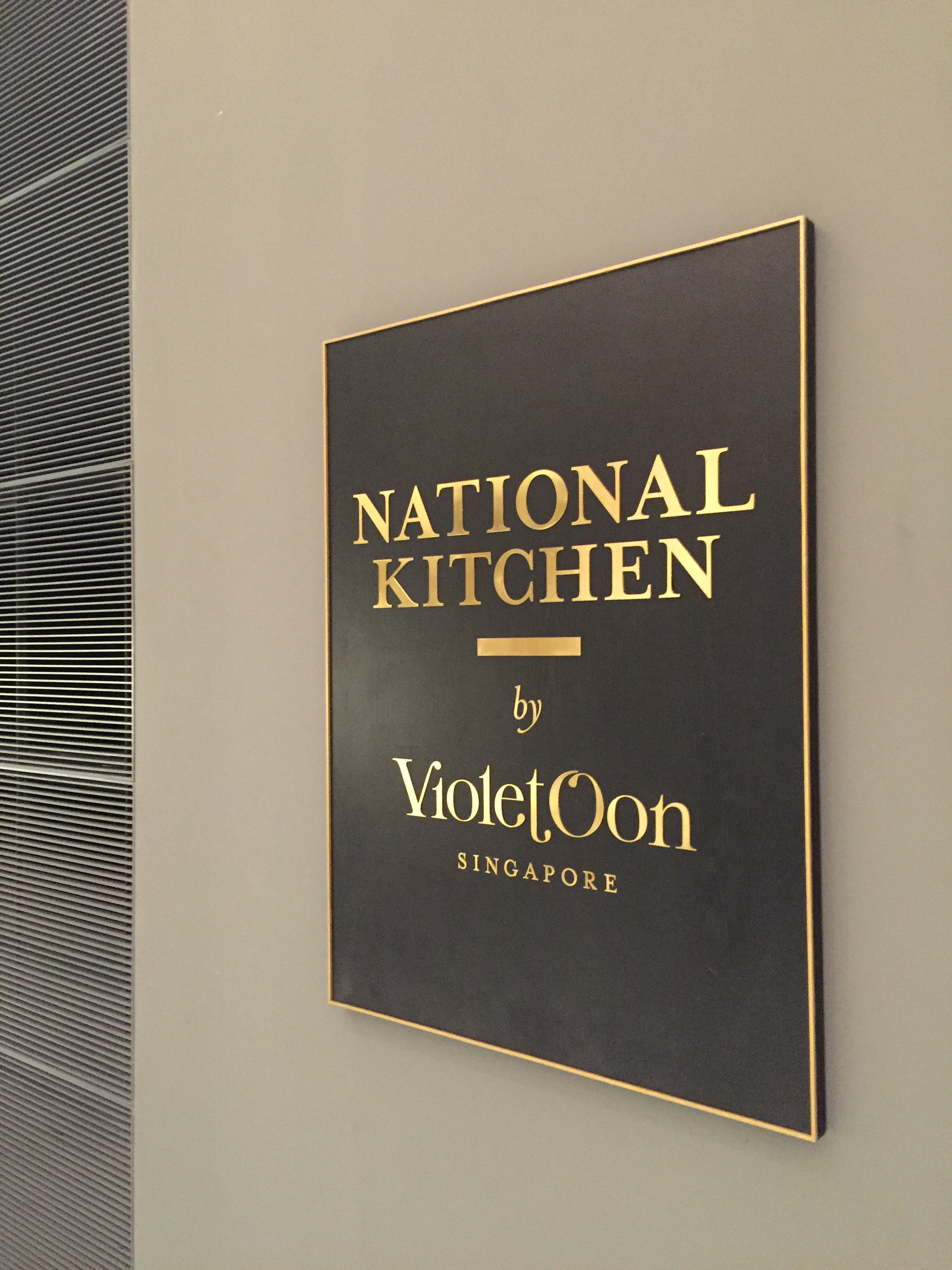
The entrance sign to National Kitchen by Violet Oon

In 1993, Oon opened her first restaurant called Violet Oon's Kitchen in the Takashimaya department store in Ngee Ann City. She also operated three cafes starting in 1995, but the restaurant and cafes closed by 1996 due to poor business.

In 2009, Oon opened another iteration of Violet Oon's Kitchen in Toa Payoh which eventually closed the following year.

In 2012, Oon and her two children opened Violet Oon's Kitchen in Bukit Timah initially with a Peranakan menu with Western influences. In 2015, Violet Oon's Kitchen was renamed Violet Oon Singapore and refocused with an entirely Peranakan menu. Later in the same year, Oon and her children opened National Kitchen by Violet Oon at National Gallery Singapore in the National Gallery Singapore.

From 2017 to 2019, Oon and her children opened three more restaurants in Clarke Quay, ION Orchard, and Jewel Changi Airport which focus on Peranakan as well as British-Hainanese cuisine.

=== Consultancy ===
In 1995, Oon began operating a food consultancy business that served several major events in Singapore such as the 2006 meeting of the International Monetary Fund and World Bank Group.

== Food Ambassador of Singapore ==
In 1988, Oon was appointed Singapore's food ambassador by the Singapore Tourist Promotion Board. Her role as food ambassador began with a three-week, eight-city trip to the United States during which she gave food demonstrations and media interviews about Singapore's culinary heritage. Her visits have included a cooking demonstration at the James Beard House. She led Singaporean teams at the World of Flavors Conference and Festival organised by the Culinary Institute of America in 2004, 2007, and 2009.

== Awards ==
In 2016, Oon was inducted into the Singapore Women's Hall of Fame.

In 2018, Oon received the Lifetime Achievement Award at the World Gourmet Summit Awards of Excellence and the Lifetime Achievement Award at The Straits Times and Lianhe Zaobao's Best Asian Restaurants Awards.

== Personal life ==
Oon has two children who are co-owners of the Violet Oon restaurants. In June 2014, Oon suffered a stroke from which she recovered.
