= Thung Syn Neo =

Singaporean social worker

Thung Syn Neo (born 1932) is a Singaporean social worker. She developed the concept and establishment of Family Service Centres for the Ministry of Social Services.

== Biography ==
Syn Neo graduated from the National University of Singapore in 1955. She worked for the government medical service as a medical social worker, and in 1965 became a lecturer in social work at the university. In 1975, she was appointed to a position at the Department of Social Work, and later at the Ministry of Social Affairs. She led a team of social welfare officers to plan a model of community-based social services centres, the first of which opened in the suburb of MacPherson in 1976. Following its success, a total of 40 similar centres were opened.

In 1981, Syn Neo joined the Housing and Development Board as its first social worker.
