= Methodist Girls' School, Singapore =

Methodist Girls' School
- 美以美女校; Sekolah Perempuan Methodist

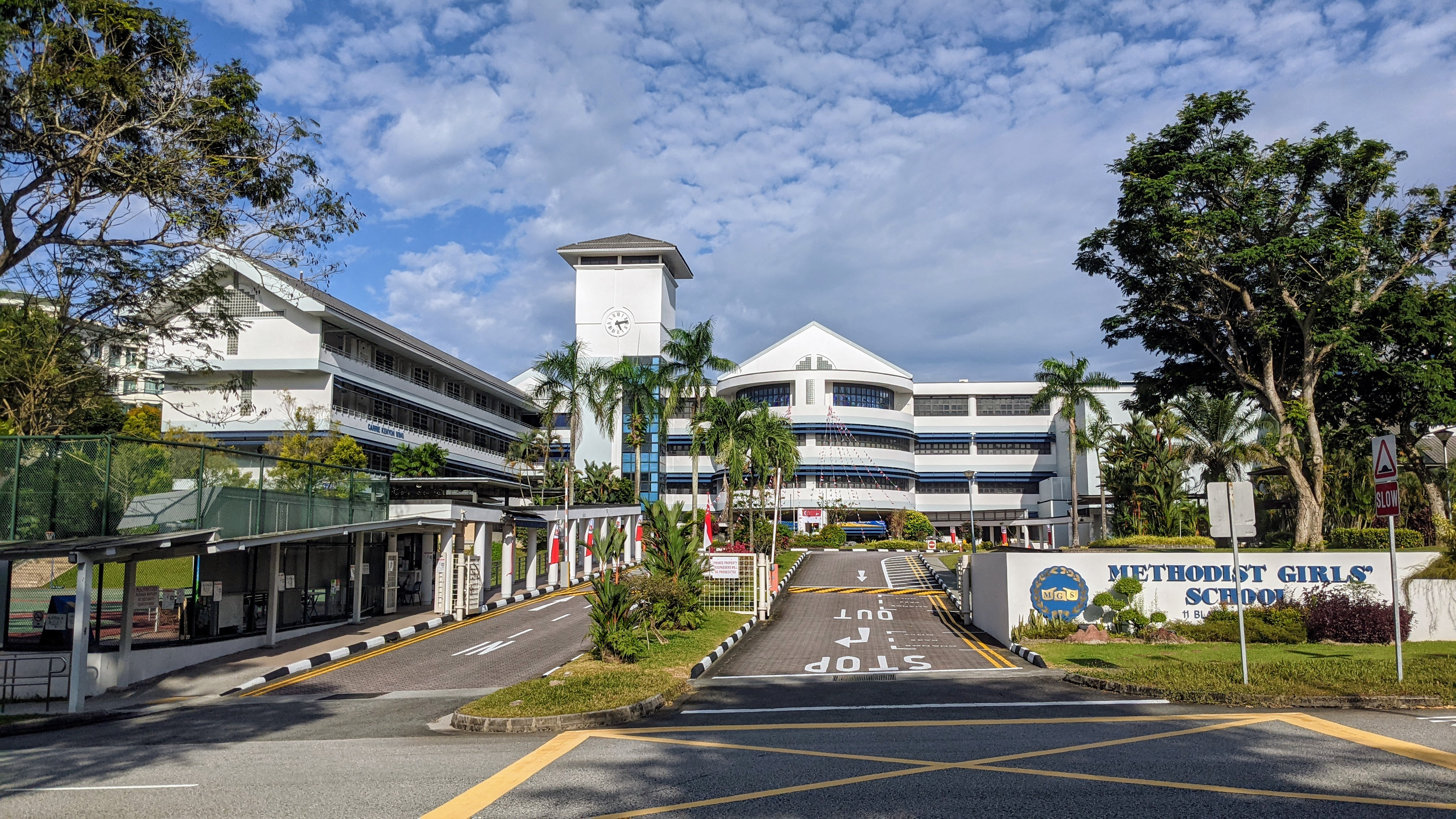

Location
- 11 Blackmore Drive, Singapore 599986
- 1°19′58.62″N 103°46′57.25″E

Information
- Type: Full School: Government-Aided (Primary) and Independent (Secondary)
- Motto: To Master, To Grow, To Serve
- Religious affiliation: Methodist
- Established: 1887
- Session: Single (day)
- School code: 7030 (Secondary O-Level); 9162 (Secondary Integrated Programme); 5027 (Primary)
- Principal: Pamela Yoong
- Grades: Primary to Secondary
- Gender: Girls
- Age: 7 to 16
- Enrolment: Approx. 2,500
- Colour: Blue Gold
- Affiliations: Anglo-Chinese School (Independent); Anglo-Chinese Junior College
- Website: www.mgs.sch.edu.sg

Methodist Girls' School (MGS) is an independent Methodist girls' school in Bukit Timah, Singapore, founded in 1887 by Australian missionary Sophia Blackmore. It offers a six-year primary education in its primary school section and a four-year secondary education in its secondary school section. Since 2013, it has partnered with its affiliated school Anglo-Chinese School (Independent) (ACS(I)) for a six-year Integrated Programme, which allows its secondary school students to proceed to ACS(I) for Years 5 and 6 to complete the International Baccalaureate Diploma Programme.

== History ==
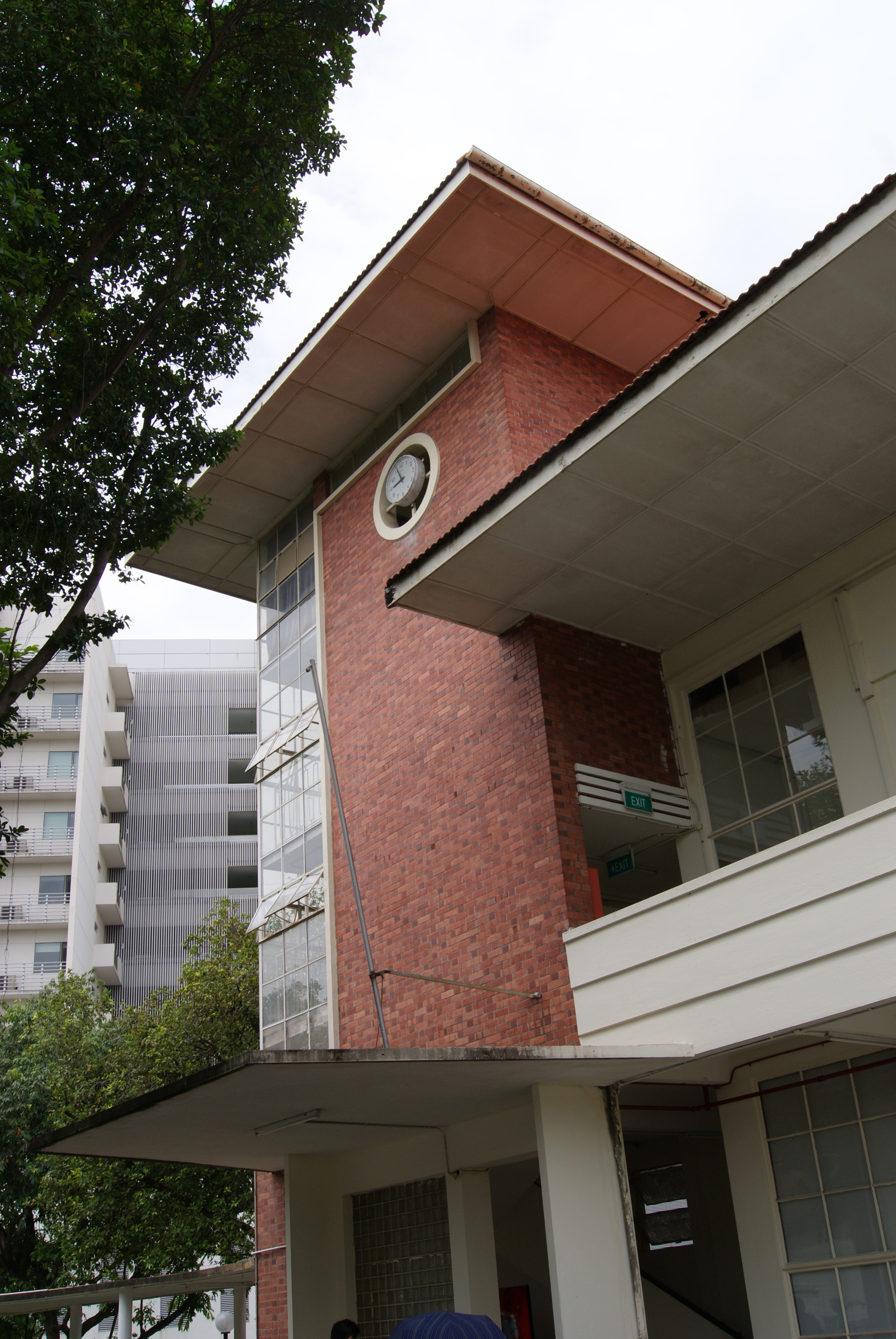
One of the buildings of the former Methodist Girls' School at 11 Mount Sophia

Methodist Girls' School was founded on 15 August 1887 by Sophia Blackmore, an Australian missionary sent by the Women's Foreign Missionary Society of the Methodist Episcopal Church of America. The school started with 9 Tamil girls in a small shophouse on Short Street. At that time, girls were expected to stay at home and do household chores, meaning that most girls didn't get any sort of education at all. By 1925 the school had reached maximum capacity, which precipitated a move to Mount Sophia, where it remained there until 1992 before being moved to its current location at Blackmore Drive.

The secondary school section of Methodist Girls' School became an independent school in January 1989. In 1992, MGS moved to a new site at 11 Blackmore Drive. The road was named after the school's founder at the request of the school.

Methodist Girls' School is a well-known institution in the region with a history of academic and sporting excellence.

In September 2010, the Ministry of Education (MOE) announced that Methodist Girls' School will partner Anglo-Chinese School (Independent), which currently offers the International Baccalaureate Diploma Programme (IBDP), in its new scheme to introduce the Integrated Programme to seven more schools.

== School identity and culture ==
=== House system ===
Upon admission, pupils are placed into one of the four houses in Methodist Girls' School.

The four houses were named after Methodist pioneers in Singapore. They were later renamed as Blackmore, Jackson, Lee and Olson.

=== Uniform ===
Pupils are easily recognized by the unique uniform of the school, which has not changed since 1922. The uniform consists of a pinafore with an upper section in white and lower section in navy blue skirt; and a white blouse with a sailor collar, which is to be worn over and covers 60% of the pinafore.

=== Pastoral ===
As a Methodist school, devotions are shared and prayers are said every morning. Weekly chapel services are also held. To support students in their spiritual development, planned activities are organized for Christian fellowship. Secondary students may also choose to join the SALT (Servants at the Lord's Task) club as a Co-Curricular Activity.

== Affiliation and admission ==
The Secondary section is affiliated to Anglo-Chinese School (Independent) and runs a joint Integrated Programme from 2013. The secondary school is also affiliated to Anglo-Chinese Junior College.

The Secondary section admits pupils from the Primary section if they obtain a minimum of AL 17, after sitting for the Primary School Leaving Examination. Students from other schools wishing to enter Methodist Girls' School are subject to a higher cut-off point determined by the quality of applicants' PSLE scores for that year. Students may also apply through the Direct School Admission (DSA) exercise, in which students may be offered a place based on specified talent areas.

== Academic information ==
The school currently offers both the four-year Secondary Education Certificate (SEC) Programme and the Integrated Programme (IP).

=== Integrated Programme (IP) ===
Methodist Girls' School is a partner school with Anglo-Chinese School (Independent), and jointly offers the International Baccalaureate Diploma Programme (IBDP) to its high-performing students. Under the Integrated Programme, students will bypass the Singapore-Cambridge Secondary Education Certificate examination at Year 4, and join the cohort of Anglo-Chinese School (Independent) in Years 5 and 6, and eventually sit the International Baccalaureate examination at the end of Year 6.

=== Secondary Education Certificate (SEC) Programme ===
This is a nationwide four-year programme that leads up to the Singapore-Cambridge Secondary Education Certificate (SEC) examination.

=== Music Elective Programme ===
One of the few schools in Singapore offering the Music Elective Programme(MEP), Methodist Girls' School has gained recognition, both before and after starting, for producing musicians such as pianist Abigail Sin and violinist Lynnette Seah, amongst others.

== Notable alumnae ==
- Ruth Wong: Educator who revolutionized teacher training in Singapore, first female principal of the Teachers' Training College
- Kwa Geok Choo: Queen's Scholar; wife of the first Prime Minister of Singapore, Lee Kuan Yew, one of Singapore's first female lawyers
- Daisy Vaithilingam: One of Singapore's first medical social workers, established Singapore's first fostering scheme for children and Movement for the Intellectually Disabled of Singapore (MINDS)
- Geh Min: First female President of the Nature Society Singapore and leading conservationist, Former Nominated Member of Parliament
- Ning Cai: Former magician and writer.
- Joscelin Yeo: Former national swimmer, multiple SEA Games gold medalists and four-time Olympian
- Khoo Teh Lynn: Singapore's first female fighter pilot at Singapore Air Force
- Kam Ning: Violinist
- Nicolette Teo: Former national swimmer, multiple SEA Games gold medalists and four-time Olympian
- Abigail Sin: Prodigy pianist
