= List of public art in Singapore =

This is a list of Singapore's public art accessible in an outdoor public space.

Image	Title	Location	Year	Artist / Designer	Collection	Notes
	“创” Chuan	9 Empress Place Singapore 179556 1.2883475°N 103.8515839°E		Joseph McNally	Others	
	2 X 2 II	138 Market Street 1.2818580°N 103.8500838°E		Antony Gormley	CapitaLand Limited	
	20 Tonnes	93 Stamford Road Singapore 178897 1.2967199°N 103.8485109°E		Han Sai Por	National Museum of Singapore	
	24 Hours in Singapore	1 Empress Place Singapore 179555 1.2874410°N 103.8513751°E		Baet Yeok Kuan	Public Art Trust	
	A Great Emporium	1 Empress Place Singapore 179555 1.2874410°N 103.8513751°E		Malcolm Koh	Singapore Tourism Board	
	A visit to the Museum: Taking the past forward	39 Armenian Street Singapore 179941		Chern Lian Shan	National Heritage Board	
	A World United	138 Market Street Singapore 048946 1.2818580°N 103.8500838°E		Huang Yifan	City Developments Limited	
	Above Below Beneath Above	138 Market Street Singapore 048946 1.2818580°N 103.8500838°E		Olafur Eliasson	CapitaLand Limited	
	All the Essentially Essential	1 Raffles Place Singapore 048616 1.2843495°N 103.8510725°E		Tan Wee Lit	City Development Limited	
	Artificial rock #71 and #86	Sheares Avenue Singapore 1.2826485°N 103.8612759°E		Zhan Wang	Marina Bay Sands	
	Asian Symphony	1E Kent Ridge Road Singapore 119228 1.2920956°N 103.783612°E		Ng Eng Teng	National University of Singapore Museum	
	Big Bang	140 Hill Street Singapore 179369 1.2907655°N 103.8482016°E		Joseph McNally	Marina Bay Sands	
	Big Dream No. 4	168 Robinson Road Singapore 068912 1.2776307°N 103.8475727°E		Gao Xiaomu	CapitaLand Limited	
	Blue Reflection Façade with Light Entry Passage	8 Bayfront Avenue Singapore 018955 1.2840627°N 103.8595227°E		James Carpenter	Marina Bay Sands	
	Breathe	Marina Bay Waterfront Promenade, Singapore 1.2843594°N 103.8583195°E		Edwin Cheong	City Developments Limited	
	Building People	168 Robinson Road Singapore 068912 1.2776307°N 103.8475727°E		Kurt Laurenz Metzler	CapitaLand Limited	
	Cascade	10 Pasir Panjang Road Singapore 117438 1.2748275°N 103.7990648°E		Nola Farman	Mapletree	
	Chinese Procession/Mid-Autumn Lantern Procession	140 Telok Ayer Street Singapore 068604 1.2814324°N 103.8476354°E		Lim Leong Seng	National Park Board	
	The Conch	10 Pasir Panjang Road Singapore 117438 1.2748275°N 103.7990648°E		Farm	Mapletree	
	Contentment	50 Kent Ridge Crescent Singapore 119279 1.3016750°N 103.7720082°E		Ng Eng Teng	National University of Singapore Museum	
	Daisy	Terminal 3, Departure Hall Central (Stretches from Arrival to Departure Level)		Christian Moeller	Changi Airport Group	
	Dragonfly Riders	18 Marina Gardens Drive Singapore 018953 1.2824776°N 103.8624254°E		Elsie Yu	Gardens by the Bay	
	Drift	1 Bayfront Avenue Singapore 018971 1.2825834°N 103.8602202°E		Antony Gormley	Marina Bay Sands	
	Dual Universe	50 Raffles Place Singapore 048623 1.2846948°N 103.8521043°E		Charles Perry	Others	
	Elliptical Pavillion	60 Pasir Panjang Road Singapore 117385 1.2763503°N 103.7994757°E		Dan Graham	Mapletree	
	Encapsulation	168 Robinson Road Singapore 068912 1.2776307°N 103.8475727°E		Brendan Neiland	CapitaLand Limited	
	Endless Flow	1 Orchard Road Singapore 238824 1.2976544°N 103.8483873°E		Tang Teng-Kee	Others	
	Endless Garden	Fort Canning Park, Singapore 1.2925163°N 103.8476818°E			National Parks Board	
	The Explorer	71 Bras Basah Road Singapore 189555 1.2973006°N 103.8509921°E		Ng Eng Teng	Singapore Art Museum	
	First Generation	1 Fullerton Square Singapore 049178 1.2862286°N 103.8530281°E		Chong Fah Cheong	Singapore Tourism Board	
	Flora Inspiration	65 Airport Boulevard Singapore 819663 1.3560861°N 103.9866106°E		Han Sai Por	Changi Airport Group	
	From Chettiars to Financiers	1 Empress Place Singapore 179555 1.2874410°N 103.8513751°E		Chern Lian Shan	Singapore Tourism Board	
	From Little Things, Big Things Grow	10 Pasir Panjang Road Singapore 117438 1.2748275°N 103.7990648°E		Jane Cowie	Mapletree	
	Happy Family of Five	1 Esplanade Drive Singapore 038981 1.2902050°N 103.8555667°E		Chuan Boon Kee	Esplanade – Theatres on the Bay	
	Harmony	9 Raffles Place Singapore 048619 1.2834836°N 103.8505740°E		Yu Yu Yang	City Developments Limited	
	Humbly on Hills	10 Pasir Panjang Road Singapore 117438 1.2748275°N 103.7990648°E		Lim Shing Ee	Mapletree	
	In the Eye of the Red Dot	National Museum of Singapore, Fort Canning Entrance (Level 2 Exit)		Yeo Chee Kiong	City Developments Limited	
	Indian Settlers	140 Telok Ayer Street Singapore 068604 1.2814324°N 103.8476354°E		Lim Leong Seng	National Park Board	
	Jelly Baby Family	68 Orchard Road Singapore 238839 1.3007477°N 103.8450476°E		Mauro Perucchetti	CapitaLand Limited	
	Kinetic Rain	80 Airport Boulevard Singapore 819642 1.3617088°N 103.9903488°E		Art+Com	Changi Airport Group	
	Kingfisher Tio	Singapore		Eng Siak Loy	Gardens by the Bay	
	Large Reclining Figure	67 Chulia Street Singapore 049515 1.2854827°N 103.8488904°E		Henry Moore	OCBC Bank	
	Living World Series	138 Market Street Singapore 048946 1.2818580°N 103.8500838°E		Ju Ming	CapitaLand Limited	
	Makan Angin	Singapore		Lim Soo Ngee	CapitaLand Limited	
	Man on the Bench	168 Robinson Road Singapore 068912 1.2776307°N 103.8475727°E		Kurt Laurenz Metzler	CapitaLand Limited	
	Moongate	18 Marina Gardens Drive Singapore 018953 1.2845886°N 103.8646566°E		Chong Fah Cheong	Gardens by the Bay	
	Mother & Child 36	1 George Street Singapore 049145 1.2856941°N 103.8478200°E		Han Meilin	CapitaLand Limited	
	Motion	10 Bayfront Avenue Singapore 018956 1.2825745°N 103.8585622°E		Israel Hadany	Marina Bay Sands	
	Nutmeg and Mace	2 Orchard Turn Singapore 238801 1.3039797°N 103.8320323°E		Kumari Nahappan	CapitaLand Limited	
	Pedas Pedas	93 Stamford Road Singapore 178897 1.2967199°N 103.8485109°E		Kumari Nahappan	National Museum of Singapore	
	Pembungaan	50 Collyer Quay Singapore 049321 1.2831669°N 103.8529683°E		Kumari Nahappan	OUE	
	Pioneering Spirit	5 Raffles Place Singapore 048618 1.2839333°N 103.8514631°E		Aw Tee Hong	Others	
	Planet	Gardens by the Bay 1.2794415°N 103.8621390°E		Marc Quinn	Gardens by the Bay	
	Points of View	1 Raffles Place Singapore 048616 1.2843495°N 103.8510725°E		Tony Cragg	Others	
	Progress and Advancement			Yang Ying-Feng	Others	
	Progressive Flow	1 Marina Boulevard Singapore 018989 1.2822551°N 103.8526151°E		Han Sai Por	Others	
	Rain Oculus	10 Bayfront Avenue Singapore 018956 1.2825745°N 103.8585622°E		Ned Kahn	Marina Bay Sands	
	Rain Tree	10 Pasir Panjang Road Singapore 117438 1.2748275°N 103.7990648°E		Kim Jongku	Mapletree	
	Reed Sculpture	80 Mohamed Sultan Road Singapore 239013 1.2912866°N 103.8404802°E		Peter Chen	City Developments Limited	
	Rhapsody on Ice	2 Jurong East Central 1 Singapore 609731 1.3333231°N 103.7401871°E		David Gerstein	CapitaLand Limited	
	Rising Forest	1 Bayfront Avenue Singapore 018971 1.2829557°N 103.8601968°E		Zheng Chongbin	Marina Bay Sands	
	Samsui Women	45 Maxwell Road Singapore 069118 1.2794488°N 103.8454006°E		Liu Jilin	Urban Redevelopment Authority	
	School Time Memories (Chapteh)	26 China Street Singapore 049568 1.2832982°N 103.8475667°E		Lim Leong Seng	China Square	
	Seeds	Singapore		Han Sai Por	Esplanade – Theatres on the Bay	
	Sense Surround	19 Tanglin Road Singapore 247911 1.3056614°N 103.8260535°E		Anthony Poon	St Regis	
	Shimmering Pearls	168 Robinson Road Singapore 068912 1.2776307°N 103.8475727°E		Han Sai Por	CapitaLand Limited	
	Shopping with the Family	12 Bedok North Drive Singapore 465492 1.3247363°N 103.9292563°E		Kim Gyung Min	CapitaLand Limited	
	Silver Lining	10 Pasir Panjang Road Singapore 117438 1.2748275°N 103.7990648°E		Jason Lim	Mapletree	
	Sky Mirror	6 Bayfront Avenue Singapore 018974 1.2862240°N 103.8592711°E		Anish Kapoor	Marina Bay Sands	
	Sonic Pathway	10 Pasir Panjang Road Singapore 117438 1.2748275°N 103.7990648°E		Zulkifle Mahmod	Mapletree	
	Spirit of Kallang	Kampong Bugis, Kallang Riverside Park, Singapore 1.3072300°N 103.8683257°E		Lim Leong Seng	Singapore Power	
	Stillness in Motion: 3 Airborne Self-Assemblies	10 Pasir Panjang Road Singapore 117383 1.2754315°N 103.7992753°E		Tomas Saraceno	Mapletree	
	Struggle for Survival	5 Raffles Place Singapore 048618 1.2839333°N 103.8514631°E		Aw Tee Hong	Others	
	Tall Tree in the Eye	10 Collyer Quay Singapore 049315 1.2832048°N 103.8519096°E		Anish Kapoor	Keppel Corporation	
	The Flight	250 North Bridge Road Singapore 179101 1.2938936°N 103.8531199°E		Etienne	CapitaLand Limited	
	The Loudskpeaker	3 Gateway Drive Singapore 608532 1.3341575°N 103.7427664°E		Dirk de Keyzser	CapitaLand Limited	
	The Magnificent Bull	18 Marina Gardens Drive Singapore 018953 1.2824142°N 103.8658159°E		Walter Matia	Gardens by the Bay	
	The Meeting	138 Market Street Singapore 048946 1.2818580°N 103.8500838°E		Etienne	CapitaLand Limited	
	The Melting Pot	5 Campbell Lane Singapore 209924 1.3056813°N 103.8522519°E		Kumari Nahappan	Others	
	Merlion	1 Fullerton Road Singapore 049213 1.2861886°N 103.8541571°E		Lim Nang Seng	Singapore Tourism Board	
	The Panda Family	3 Gateway Drive Singapore 608532 1.3341575°N 103.7427664°E		Julien Marinetti	CapitaLand Limited	
	The Rising Moon	Esplanade Park Singapore 1.2894878°N 103.8536627°E		Han Sai Por	Public Art Trust	
	The River Merchants	2 Battery Road Singapore 049907 1.2858745°N 103.8525326°E		Aw Tee Hong	Singapore Tourism Board	
	The Sound of Nature	5 Raffles Place Singapore 048618 1.2839333°N 103.8514631°E		Lim Leong Seng	Far East Organisation	
	The Tightrope Walker	3 Gateway Drive Singapore 608532 1.3341575°N 103.7427664°E		Dirk de Keyzer	CapitaLand Limited	
	The Walk	3 Gateway Drive Singapore 608532 1.3341575°N 103.7427664°E		Dirk de Keyzer	CapitaLand Limited	
	The Wind, Her Rain and a Cloud Meet a Tree in the Monsoon Season	180 Kitchener Road Singapore 208539 1.3114210°N 103.8566240°E		Yeo Chee Kiong	City Developments Limited	
	Tipping Wall	1 Bayfront Avenue Singapore 018971 1.2846620°N 103.8610059°E		Ned Kahn	Marina Bay Sands	
	Tree of the Elements	21 Lower Kent Ridge Road Singapore 119077 1.2963657°N 103.7796770°E		Joseph McNally	National University of Singapore Museum	
	Tropical Leaf	1 Raffles Quay Singapore 048583 1.2811834°N 103.8518998°E		Han Sai Por	Others	
	Urban People	2 Orchard Turn Singapore 238801 1.3039797°N 103.8320323°E		Kurt Laurenz Metzler	CapitaLand Limited	
	Wall Drawing#915, Arcs and Circles, and Irregular Bands	1 Bayfront Avenue Singapore 018971 1.2834542°N 103.8608090°E		Sol LeWitt	Marina Bay Sands	
	Wall Drawing#917, Arcs and Circles	1 Bayfront Avenue Singapore 018971 1.2825834°N 103.8602202°E		Sol LeWitt	Marina Bay Sands	
	Watching Clouds	18 Marina Gardens Drive Singapore 018953 1.2847278°N 103.8633333°E		Paul Vanstone	Gardens by the Bay	
	Waterfall	2 Orchard Turn Singapore 238801 1.3039797°N 103.8320323°E		Troika	Gardens by the Bay	
	Wave	10 Pasir Panjang Road Singapore 117438 1.2748275°N 103.7990648°E		Baet Yeok Kuan	Mapletree	
	Wealth	50 Kent Ridge Crescent Singapore 119279 1.3016750°N 103.7720082°E		Ng Eng Teng	National University of Singapore Museum	
	Wind Arbor	10 Bayfront Avenue Singapore 018956 1.2824070°N 103.8583927°E		Ned Kahn	Marina Bay Sands	
	Wind Sculpture I	10 Pasir Panjang Road Singapore 117438 1.2748275°N 103.7990648°E		Yinka Shonibare	Mapletree	
