= Rossana Bossaglia =

Italian art historian and critic

Rossana Bossaglia (14 June 1925 – 8 July 2014) was an Italian art historian and art critic.

== Life ==
Born in Belluno, she graduated in medieval art history at the University of Pavia under Professor Wart Arslan. He was then an ordinary lecturer in modern art history at the same university after having taught the history of art criticism at the University of Genoa.

From the 1960s onwards, her field of interest was Italian Art Nouveau or 'Liberty', especially its architectural side. She curated several exhibitions on the topic - in 1972 at La Permanente in Milan, in 1977 in Galleria d'arte moderna di Bologna, and in 1981 at Villa Malpensata in Lugano. She also organised several monographic exhibitions, for example on Fantoni in Bergamo in 1978, one on bronze sculpture in Padua in 1982 and on Raimondo D'Aronco in Udine and another in 1984 on Leonardo Bistolfi in Casale Monferrato.

In 1989, following the sudden collapse of the Civic Tower in Pavia, she led the faction that successfully opposed rebuilding it, accusing those supporting such a move of historical forgery. In 1990 she began collaborating with Ilisso Edizioni and from 1992 curated the "Appunti d'Arte" network. She died in Varzi and is buried in San Colombano al Lambro.

== Works ==
- Saggio Con uno straccio ti dipingo un re in Emanuele Luzzati cantastorie, Natasha Pulitzer (ed.), COEDIZIONI D'ARTE, Bassano del Grappa, 1994
- Mazzucotelli l'artista italiano del ferro battuto liberty, Rossana Bossaglia, Arno M.Hammacher, Il Polifilo, Milano, 1971
- Il Liberty in Italia, Milano, Il Saggiatore, 1968
- Giuseppe Palanti: saggio critico, La Rete, 1972
- Il Liberty: storia e fortuna del Liberty italiano, Firenze, Sansoni, 1974
- I Fantoni: quattro secoli di bottega di scultura in Europa, Rossana Bossaglia (ed.); saggi e schede di Marco Lorandi [et al.], Vicenza, Pozza, 1978
- Rossana Bossaglia, Mia Cinotti, Tesoro e museo del Duomo (2 vol.), Mondadori Electa, 1978
- Bistolfi, Editalia, 1981
- Rossana Bossaglia, Giorgio Di Genova, Armando Ginesi, Fabriano(c)arte 1985. La scultura in carta, Bora, 1985
- Rossana Bossaglia, Piergiovanni Castagnoli, Paolo Troubetzkoy scultore (Verbania, 1866–1938), Alberti, 1988
- Il giglio, l'iris, la rosa, Sellerio, 1988
- Rossana Bossaglia, A. Malvilla, Renato Brozzi, ed. Umberto Allemandi & C., 1989
- Rossana Bossaglia, Fernando Rea, Vittorio Manini. Un bergamasco nella Roma della Secessione, Grafica e arte, 1989
- Francesco Ciusa, Ilisso, 1990
- Rossana Bossaglia, Placido Cherchi, Nivola, Ilisso, 1990
- Sironi e il Novecento, Giunti Editore, 1991
- Parlando con Argan, Ilisso, 1992
- Sironi I tessuti e le arti applicate, Ilisso, 1992
- Scenografie: Sandro Angelini, Grafica e arte, 1992
- Rossana Bossaglia, Claudia Gian Ferrari, Il Novecento italiano, Charta, 1996
- L'arte nella cultura italiana del Novecento, Laterza, 1996
- Egidio Bonfante, Mondadori Electa, 1996
- Milano. Capolavori, Grafica e arte, 1996
- Luciano Bertocchi, Vasco Bianchi, Rossana Bossaglia, Due secoli di pittura barocca a Pontremoli, Sagep, 1997
- L'art déco, Laterza, 1997
- Rossana Bossaglia, Carlo Rapp, Lo scoglio di Stendhal e altri approdi, Alberti, 1998
- Il liberty in Italia, Charta, 1998
- Maria Baldan. Opere 1965–2000, ed. Bora, 2002
- La nave di Ulisse, Rosellina Archinto Editore, 2005
- Monteforte. Paesaggi della memoria, Editoriale Giorgio Mondadori, 2005

=== Exhibition catalogues ===
- Marco Cornini. Sculture, Cremona, Galleria Il Triangolo, 1992
- Archeologia dell'anima, ed. Mazzotta, 1992
- Gustavo Foppiani. Opere (1945–1986), Galleria Braga, 1993
- Marinetti e il futurismo a Roma, Casagrande-Fidia-Sapiens, 1993
- Cerdonio, ed. Mazzotta, 1994
- Les grandes dames. Due secoli di donne celebri, Milano, palazzo della Ragione, 6-31 ottobre 1995, Charta, 1995
- Contardo Barbieri. Un libero Novecento (Pavia, Castello, 1995), Charta, 1995
- Milano. Cento artisti per la città, Milano, 1995, ed. Mazzotta, 1995

=== Collaborations ===
- Liberty siciliano, in Storia della Sicilia, Palermo, vol. 10, 1981
- Rimembranze liberty: la scultura nel Monumentale di Milano, in FMR, Ed. Franco Maria Ricci, 1982
- Cinque artisti a Milano, Ed. Mazzotta, 2003
- Capolavori italiani nel mondo, Grafica e arte, 2001

== External links (in Italian) ==
- Centro Studi ''Rossana Bossaglia'', on centrobossaglia.it.
- "RAI Edu - Il Novecento Italiano - 1996".
- "Portrait of Rossana Bossaglia, 2005".
- with Guido Villa and others, 2002
- with Daniele Oppi
