= All the Essentially Essential =

Sculpture in Raffles Place Park, Singapore

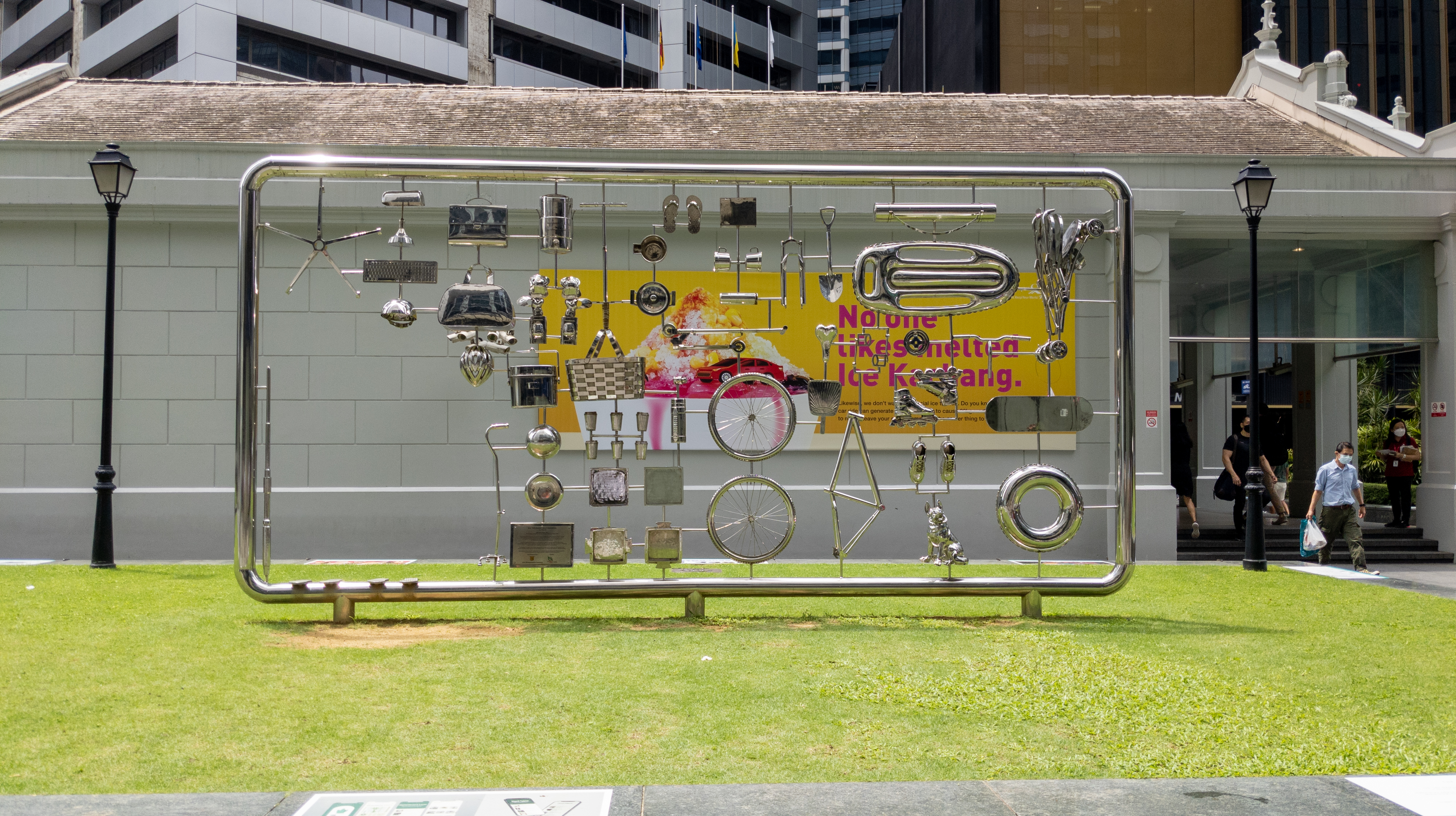
- Front view of the sculpture
- Artist: Tan Wee Lit
- Year: 2007 (proposed design); 2013 (installation)
- Medium: Stainless steel
- Dimensions: 3 m (9.8 ft)
- Location: Singapore; 1°17′05″N 103°51′05″E
- Website: Webpage on the City Developments Limited website Webpage on the National Arts Council website

All the Essentially Essential is a sculpture by Tan Wee Lit. Displayed in Raffles Place Park, Singapore, the stainless steel sculpture depicts a toy kit that has different items as pieces, such as a stroller and a briefcase. Its left side is intentionally empty to allow people "complete" the artwork. Writers have viewed All the Essentially Essential to be a satirisation of the work-life balance that Singaporeans desire.

The proposed design of All the Essentially Essential was submitted to an art competition in 2007 and won. The sculpture was initially planned to be installed at the then-upcoming Extreme Skate Park in East Coast Park by 2009, but was instead installed at Raffles Place Park in 2013. Between 2023 to 2026, the sculpture was added to two art trails of Raffles Place.

== History ==
In 2007, the property development company City Developments Limited hosted their third iteration of the Singapore Sculpture Award, a biennial arts competition intended "to promote greater interest in the sculptural artform while enriching the landscape"; the winning submissions were commissioned to be installed at a site. Tan Wee Lit – a postgraduate student at the School of the Art Institute of Chicago – submitted a proposed design for All the Essentially Essential in the "open" category of the competition. The design won the contest, with one of the competition's judges, the sculptor Han Sai Por, stating that the outdoor location of the sculpture was pertinent to the work as it "interacts with people too".

The proposed design was temporarily displayed at the Singapore Art Museum in September 2007. All the Essentially Essential was initially commissioned to be installed at the then-upcoming Extreme Skate Park in East Coast Park by 2009, but was installed at Raffles Place Park in November 2013, costing S$200,000 (US$149,253.73). In 2023, the Raffles Place Alliance added All the Essentially Essential to a self-guided tour of artworks in Raffles Place. Three years later, the National Arts Council also added the sculpture to an art trail of the Civic District.

== Details ==
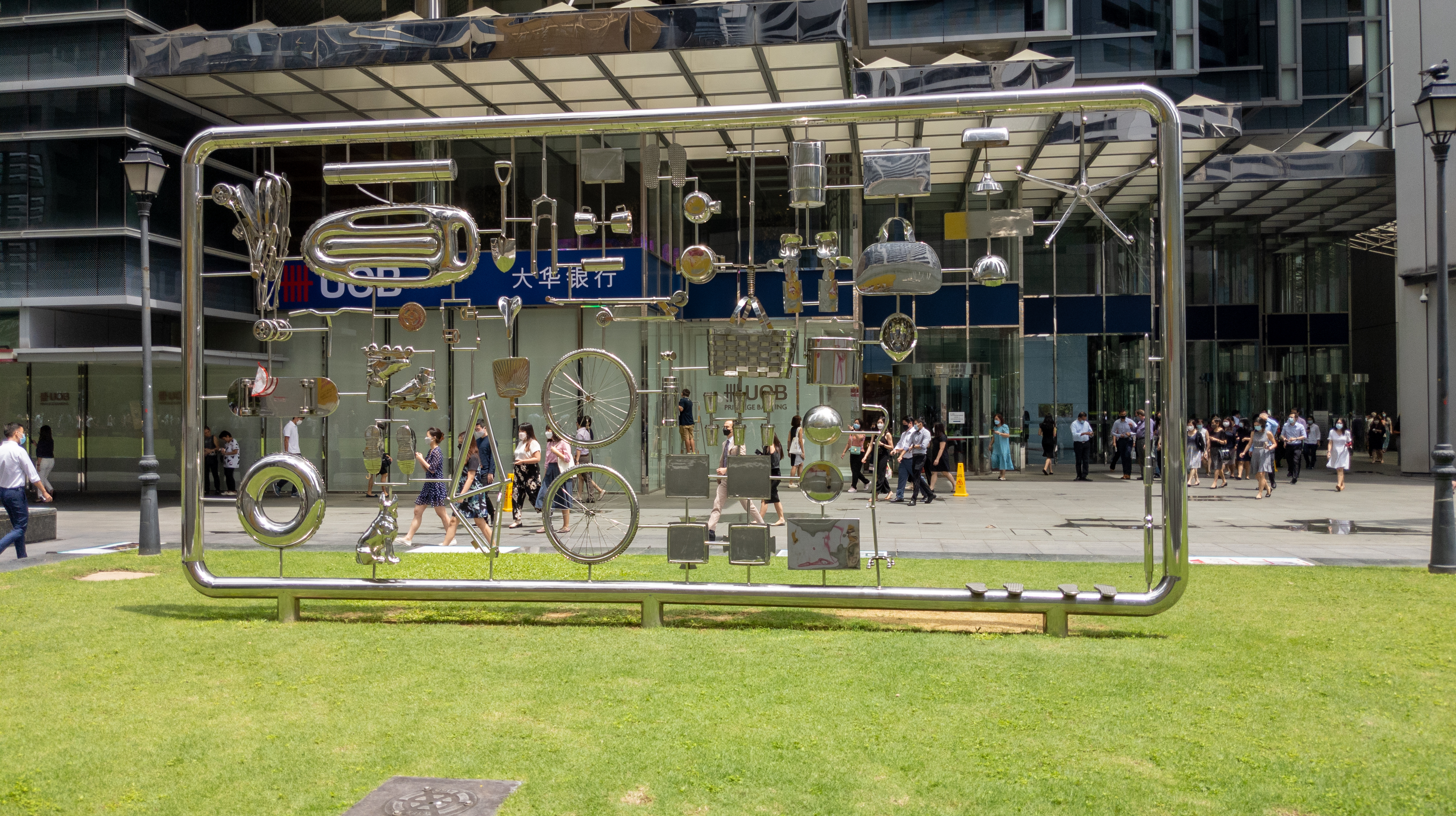
Rear view of the sculpture

All the Essentially Essential is a 3 metres (9.8 ft) tall stainless steel sculpture displayed outdoors at Raffles Place Park, near an exit of Raffles Place MRT station. The sculpture depicts a toy kit that has several items as its pieces, such as a briefcase, a baby stroller and bicycle wheels; All the Essentially Essential initially only included items "for a day at the beach", like a picnic basket and a yoga mat, but when the sculpture was relocated to Raffles Place, Tan added a couple more items that are "reflective of working life" to the sculpture. The sculpture's left side is intentionally left empty to let people "complete" the artwork – Tan intended it to represent "the human component which is essential to our overall happiness".

Writers viewed the sculpture as a satirisation of the work-life balance that Singaporeans want through a "packed-to-the-brim" lifestyle, with Francis Kan of The Business Times opining that the items depicted by the sculpture "reflect the 'work hard, play hard' environment in Singapore" – Lydia Vasko of The Straits Times interpreted All the Essentially Essential to be a "tongue-in-cheek" response to the competition's theme of "aspirations". Roots, a website published by the National Heritage Board, viewed the artwork's empty section as "an important reminder that amidst the hustle and bustle of life, people's vitality and aspirations are the most essential factors that make life complete".
