= Marinetti =

Marinetti is a surname. Notable people with the surname include:

- Antonio Marinetti (born c. 1700), Italian painter also known as "Il Chiozzotro"
- Filippo Tommaso Marinetti (1876–1944), Italian art theorist and founder of the Futurist movement
- Julien Marinetti (born 1967), French painter, sculptor and visual artist

== See also ==
- Marini, surname
- Sorelle Marinetti, Italian trio of three males singers in travesti fashion
- Sugo Marinetti, sauce
