= Progress and Advancement =

Bronze sculpture by Yang-Ying Fen in Raffles Place, Singapore

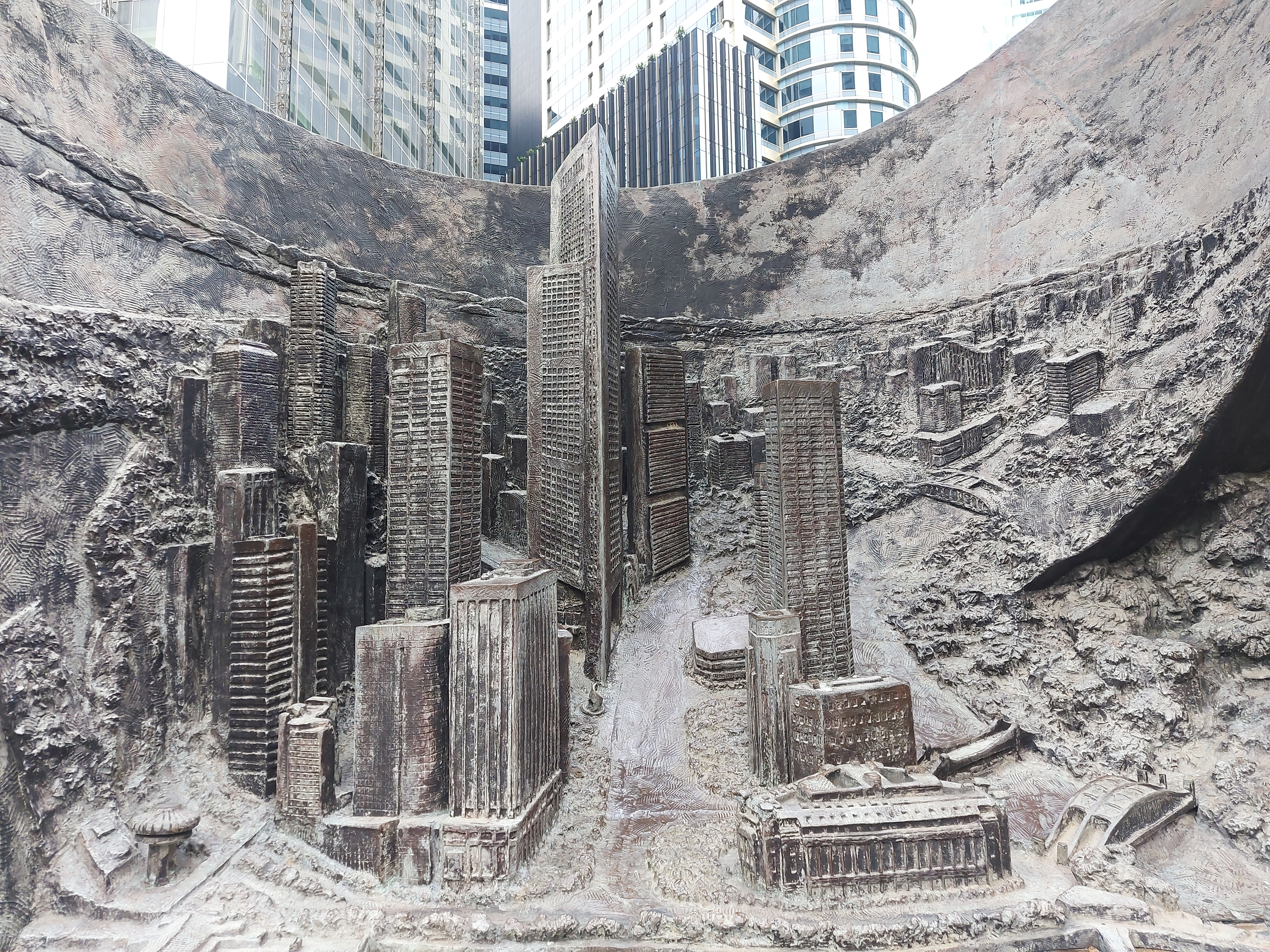
- A zoom-up shot of the artwork
- Artist: Yang-Ying Fen
- Completion date: 8 August 1988
- Medium: Bronze
- Subject: Singapore's prosperity and history
- Dimensions: 8.5 cm (3.3 in)
- Weight: 9 metric tonnes
- Location: Singapore; 1°17′05″N 103°51′05″E
- Website: SG101 article

Progress and Advancement is an 8.5 metres (28 ft) bronze sculpture by Taiwanese artist Yang-Ying Fen. Located outside of Raffles Place MRT station, the sculpture weighs 9,000 kilograms (20,000 lb). It depicts a model of Singapore's Central Business District (CBD) surrounded by a spiral representing a dragon. There are also 3 reliefs on the sculpture's busts depicting Admiral Cheng Ho's treasure voyage, Raffles' arrival into Singapore, and Singapore as the world's busiest port at the time of the sculpture's unveiling. It was one of Yang's biggest projects, costing around S$1 million (1988) (US$496,912.93) at the time of its opening,

Progress and Advancement was initially commissioned for the United Overseas Bank Centre (UOBC) by Lien Ying Chow and was going to be made out of stainless steel. Over fears of light reflecting to other buildings from the sculpture, it was decided that the sculpture would be made out of bronze. After a two-week shipping delay, the sculpture was assembled 3 hours before the UOBC's opening ceremony on 8 August 1988. However, it was moved to Raffles Place MRT station on 4 August 1989 by the Public Arts Committee to enhance the artistic value of Raffles Place. It was reported to have positive reception from passers-by, who said that the sculpture was "unique".

== History ==
The sculpture was commissioned for the United Overseas Bank Centre (UOBC) by Lien Ying Chow, then-United Overseas Bank (UOB) chairman. Originally, the sculpture was going to be an S-shaped spiral made of stainless steel, Yang's favourite material. However, Lien wanted the sculpture to include a brief history of Singapore as well as to not be made of stainless steel as he feared that the sculpture would reflect light to the surrounding buildings, which may be annoying for them. After they both agreed that the sculpture would be made of bronze, Yang visited Lien from Taipei six times to show models of the sculpture between 1987 and 1988. After a two-week delay, the sculpture was shipped from Taiwan to Singapore in three pieces on 6 August 1988. Yang was led to believe that it would be shipped directly from Taipei whereas it went to Kaohsiung before being shipped to Singapore. Yang and his twenty men from Taiwan proceeded to work non-stop for 36 hours to install the sculpture, finishing 3 hours before the opening ceremony of the UOBC on 8 August 1988. At the time, it was one of Yang's biggest project in terms of cost, costing around S$1 million (1988) (US$496,912.93).

The sculpture was initially displayed in front of the UOBC, where it was reported that newly-weds would pose next to sculpture during the weekends. However, it was donated by Lien to the Public Arts Committee as a part of a scheme to identify suitable places for sculpture before encouraging donation. As the first artwork of this new scheme, it was moved next to Raffles Place MRT station on 4 August 1989 to "record Singapore's progress and enhance the artistic value of Raffles Place". It received positive reception from passersby, who complimented how the sculpture was "unique" and displayed Singapore's progress.

== Details ==
Progress and Advancement is a 8.5 metres (28 ft) tall sculpture weighing 9,000 kilograms (20,000 lb). It depicts an S-shaped spiral, which stands for 'Singapore', with the swirl of the sculpture representing a dragon, further shown with a hole representing the eye of the dragon. Inside the spiral, there is a model of the Central Business District, depicting buildings such as the UOBC and Clifford Pier. Even though the buildings' proportions were slightly adjusted to fit in the sculpture, Yang justified it by saying "I cannot be too realistic or precise in details. I am not making an architectural model... here, the most important thing is to project the spirit".

The bust of the sculpture features 3 reliefs showcasing Singapore's history at that time: Admiral Cheng Ho's passing by Singapore and the Strait of Malacca during his voyage into Southeast Asia, Raffles' arrival into Singapore, and Singapore as a busy port at the time of the sculpture's creation. When asked about the reliefs, Yang said:

I take both the realistic and symbolic approaches in moulding the relief... I cannot be too realistic in approach when retelling history, otherwise I will never finish the story. Each stage of development is realistic enough for people to understand, yet is symbolic to cover significant events during the period... If it is too realistic, the artistic and aesthetic aspects will suffer. At the other extreme, if it is too symbolic, viewers may not understand what I am trying to express.

== See also ==
- List of public art in Singapore
