= The River Merchants =

Sculpture by Aw Tee Hong in Singapore

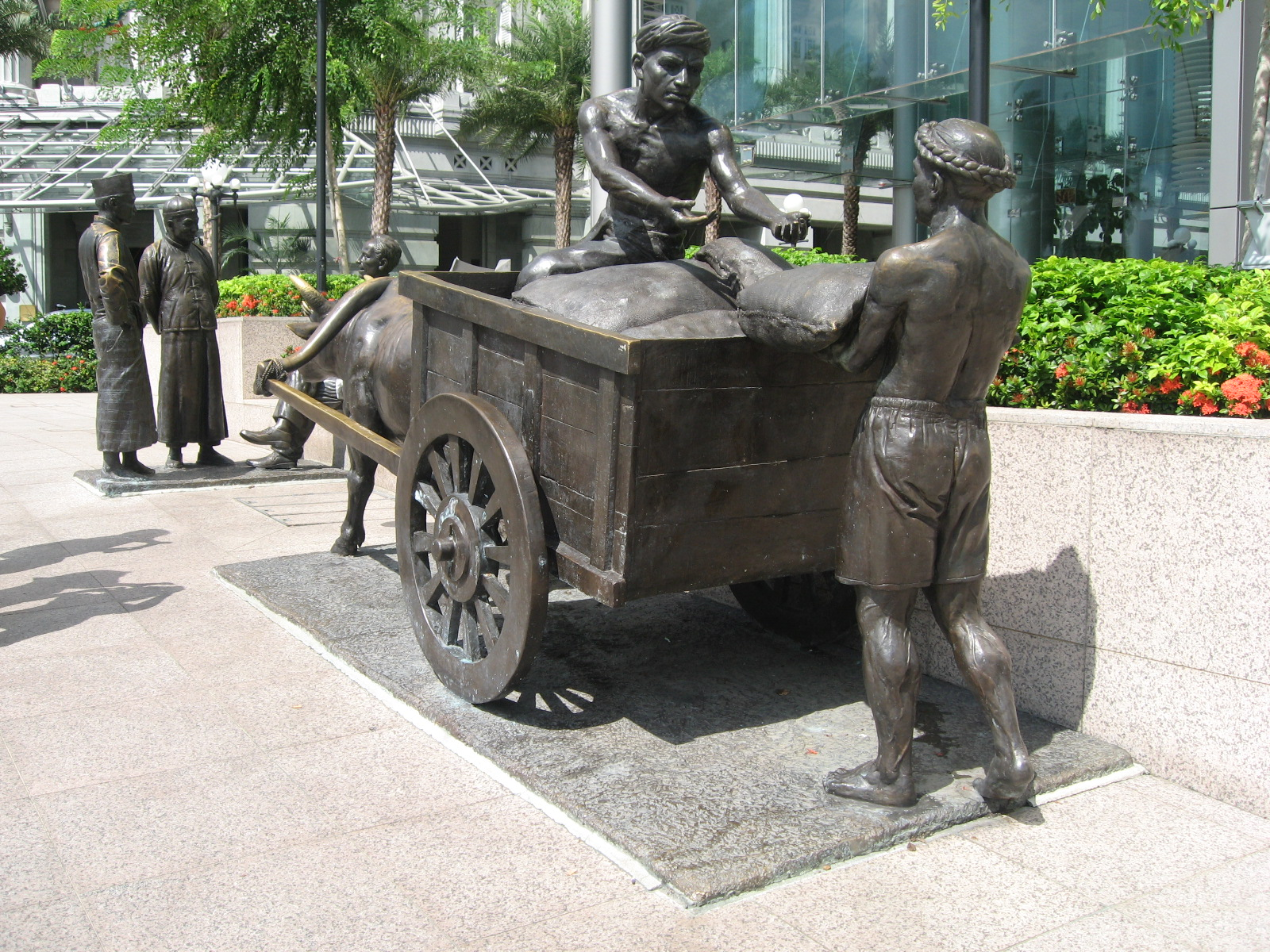
- The sculpture in 2006
- Location: 1.2861°N 103.8524°E

The River Merchants is a sculpture by Aw Tee Hong, installed in Singapore.
