= Chng Seok Tin =

Singaporean artist (1946–2019)

- 莊心珍
- Born: 6 October 1946; Katong, Singapore
- Died: 6 September 2019 (aged 72); Singapore
- Known for: Printmaking, sculpture, mixed media
- Awards: Cultural Medallion; Singapore Chinese Literary Award; Singapore Women's Hall of Fame
- Website: http://chngseoktin.com/

Chng Seok Tin (莊心珍; 6 October 1946 – 6 September 2019) was a visually-impaired printmaker, sculptor and multi-media artist from Singapore. She was often inspired by the i-Ching and Buddhism. Her work has been shown internationally; Chng had over 26 solo shows and 100 group shows. In addition to her art, she was also a prolific writer and has published 11 collections of her writing, mostly in Chinese. She also advocated for artists with disabilities.

== Biography ==
=== Early life and education ===
Chng grew up poor in Katong, in a "leaky attap house in Kampung Chai Chee." Her parents wanted all of their seven children to go to school. Chng attended Chung Cheng High School which had an art department taught by teachers from the Shanghai Art Academy. Later, in 1966, she attended the Teachers' Training College. She began to teach Chinese at the Tanjong Katong Girls' School later that year. Eventually, Chng started taking art lessons privately, and then attended the Nanyang Academy of Fine Arts where she received a diploma in Western painting. In 1979, she received a BA from the Hull College of Higher Education in England. Also in 1979, she had an exhibition of prints at the National Museum of Art Gallery in Singapore. Chng then received an award from the Ministry of Culture to study advanced printmaking in 1980. In 1983 she earned her master's degree in arts from New Mexico State University and then a masters of fine arts from the University of Iowa in 1985.

In 1986, Chng headed the print-making department at Lasalle-SIA College of the Arts. She was also an art editor for the Joint Publishing Company in Hong Kong.

=== Visual impairment ===
In June 1988, Chng and a group of her students were visiting art museums of Europe. While trying to catch a bus with her students, Chng fell and hit her head on the pavement in London. After the accident, Chng experienced bouts of dizziness and while back in Singapore, found out that she had a brain abscess. Chng lost 90% of her vision in 1988 after she had surgery on the brain abscess caused by the fall. For about a year after becoming nearly blind, she felt "tormented" but then she became "philosophical about it." She said that finally meeting other blind people was a turning point. Another turning point was an invitation to return to the print-making department at Lasalle. Brother Joseph McNally, president emeritus at Lasalle, reached out to her because he said that even without her sight, Chng still commanded good print-making technique. Chng was able to "see" the colors of her prints in her mind. She said of her work, "I had all the basics in my mind and I had to slowly start using them." She said that losing her sight forced her to "rely on her feelings." Chng taught at Lasalle until 1997.

=== Later career ===
Chng "never hesitated to comment on the social milieu" in her work. In 2001, she was named Woman of the Year by Singapore's magazine, Her World.

While Chng was a fellow at the Vermont Studio Center in 2003, she protested the United States invasion of Iraq with other artists. The work that resulted from her experience range from landscapes of Vermont to prints inspired by the Iraq War.

In 2005, she was the first person from Singapore to hold a solo exhibition at the Headquarters of the United Nations. Chng explored the opportunity of showing her work at the UN after she heard about a Chinese artist showing work there. She contacted an old schoolmate, Lee Fong Yang who works at the UN Headquarters, who inquired on her behalf and helped her arrange the show. She also received the Cultural Medallion that same year.

In 2007, she received the Singapore Chinese Literary Award from the Singapore Literature Society.

Chng had a retrospective exhibition at the Nanyang Academy of Fine Arts in 2011. In 2014, she was inducted into the Singapore Women's Hall of Fame. In 2015, Chng was recognized by the Singapore Ministry of Culture, Community and Youth "as a pioneer of the modern printmaking practice in Singapore."

Chng died of cancer at the age of 73 on 6 September 2019.
