= Chong Fah Cheong =

Singaporean sculptor

- Born: 1946; Singapore
- Education: Self-taught
- Known for: Contemporary sculpture
- Children: 2
- Awards: 1981: First Prize for Sculpture, Singapore Innovations in Art Exhibition; 1982: Special Award, National Day Art Exhibition; 1987: Certificate of Participation, National Museum Centenary Art Exhibition; 1988: Merit Award, IBM Art Award Exhibition; 1990: Merit Award, IBM Art Award Exhibition; 2014: Cultural Medallion

Chong Fah Cheong (simplified Chinese: 张华昌; traditional Chinese: 張華昌; pinyin: Zhāng Huá Chāng) is a Singaporean sculptor known for many public sculptures in Singapore. He is considered one of Singapore’s pioneer sculptors and was awarded the Cultural Medallion, Singapore's pinnacle arts award in 2014. Though he worked in a variety of styles from abstract to figurative, his name is identified with a series of figurative sculptures depicting the life of people living and working along the Singapore River.

== Early life and education ==
Chong was born to a large family, the 12th child of 13 children, of a general practitioner and housewife. Since the age of four, he loved to draw and sketch, and displayed talent in art. In school this talent continued to shine, but he was never good with his academic subjects. At the age of 14, the young Chong decided to quit school after completing Form 3 (Year 10) education at the St. Joseph's Institution, to join the Lasalle Brothers novitiate in Penang. Chong spent the next 7 years with the teaching order, leading a cloistered life and training to be a teacher.

In 1967, he returned to secular life and began his career as a school teacher in Teluk Anson, Malaysia. A year later, he left his job to read Social Science at the University of Singapore and a diploma in curriculum studies in art and design from the City of Birmingham Polytechnic in the United Kingdom.

== Career ==
Chong was an art teacher at Saint Patrick's School in the 1970s where Brother Joseph McNally was the principal. Chong made his first sculptures out of wood after being told by McNally to make use of wood from trees felled on campus. Chong left teaching in 1978.

In September 1981, Chong won the First Prize for Sculpture, Singapore Innovations in Art Exhibition for his art piece, Triad.

In 2000, Chong created a sculpture, First Generation, as part of a series of sculptures by various sculptors, in the Open Air Interpretative Centre project by the Singapore Tourism Board. The sculpture was the first to be unveiled on December 31, 2000.

In 2001 Chong was commissioned by Wing Tai Holdings to create An Overture, a 3,700 tonne jade sculpture to be installed at the courtyard of the House of Tan Yeok Nee. The $800,000 commission work began on 14 February that year, and was unveiled at the House on 13 July 2001 to complement the finishing of the restoration work on the 115-year-old national monument, which was completed in September 2000 at a cost of $12 million.

In 2002, Chong was commissioned by the city of Penticton to create a piece of public art, The Romp, a bronze statue of children playing.

In 2011, Chong was commissioned by Asia-Pacific Breweries, in celebration of their 80th anniversary, to create a bronze sculpture, Chang Kuda, featuring six boys riding piggy-back. The $200,000 piece was unveiled in 2011 at the Swan Lake in the Singapore Botanic Gardens.

The Bamboo Garden at the National Library building featured nine of Chong's bronze and marble figures of readers and fantastical creatures. The garden was opened for public use in April 2012.

In 2014, Chong was awarded the Cultural Medallion.

Eighteen sculture pieces from Chong are part of Singapore's National Collection of art and displayed in the National Art Gallery when it opened in 2015.

== Personal life ==
Chong married Pang Guek Cheng, a journalist, in 1972 and had 2 children together. In 1989, Chong moved his family to Merritt, British Columbia, Canada for a slower pace of life.

== Gallery ==
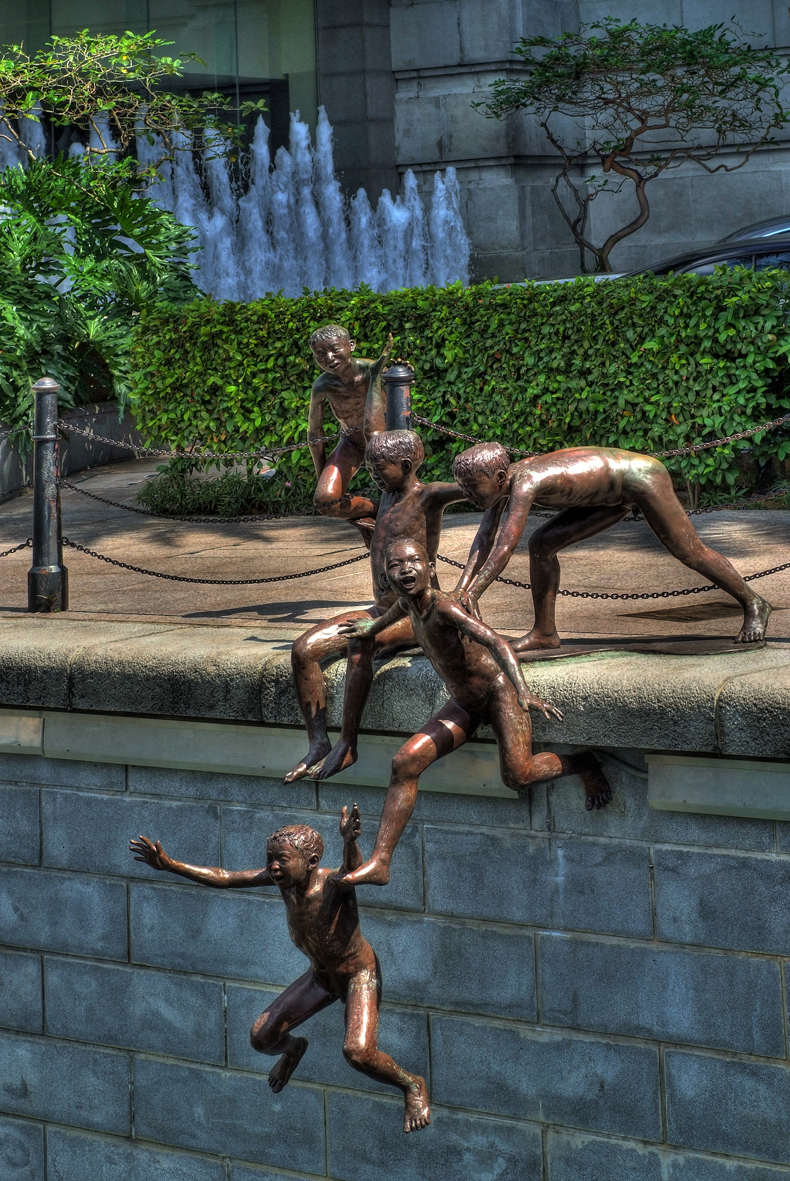
First Generation (2000)
Size: various
Medium: Bronze
Collection: Fullerton Hotel
Location: Cavenagh Bridge, Singapore

== Major exhibitions ==
| Dates | Title | Location | Ref |
|---|---|---|---|
| 26 November - 28 November 1981 | Woodscape | Alpha Gallery; Singapore | |
| 1982 | Woodscape II | Leon & Joel Galleries; Singapore | |
| 1984 | Exhibition | Citibank; Singapore | |
| 1985 | Exhibition | Alpha Gallery; Singapore | |
| 1992 | Sculptures in Wood, Stone & Bronze (22 – 27 August) | Lasalle-SIA College of the Arts; Singapore | |
| 1992 | Openings | Strand Gallery; Merritt, British Columbia | |
| 23 August - 28 August 1994 | Dreamcatcher | The Substation; Singapore | |
| 1996 | Prime Elements (7 – 16 May) | Fort Canning Centre Gallery; Singapore | |
| 1996 | Recent Works (12 – 20 October) | The Substation; Singapore | |
| 19 September - 20 October 1999 | Handmade: Shifting Paradigms (Group show) | Singapore Art Museum; Singapore | |
| 1 February 2013 - 28 April 2013 | Textures, Tones & Timbres: Art of Chong Fah Cheong | NUS MuseumSingapore | |
