= Kumari Nahappan =

Singaporean sculptor (born 1953)

- Born: 1953 (age 72–73); Klang, Selangor, Federation of Malaya
- Education: Diploma in Interior Design (Willesden College of Technology, London, 1976); Advance Diploma in Fine Arts (LASALLE College of the Arts, Singapore, 1992); MFA (Royal Melbourne Institute of Technology, Australia, 1995)
- Known for: Sculpture, public art, installation art, painting
- Movement: Contemporary art
- Website: https://www.kumarinahappan.com/

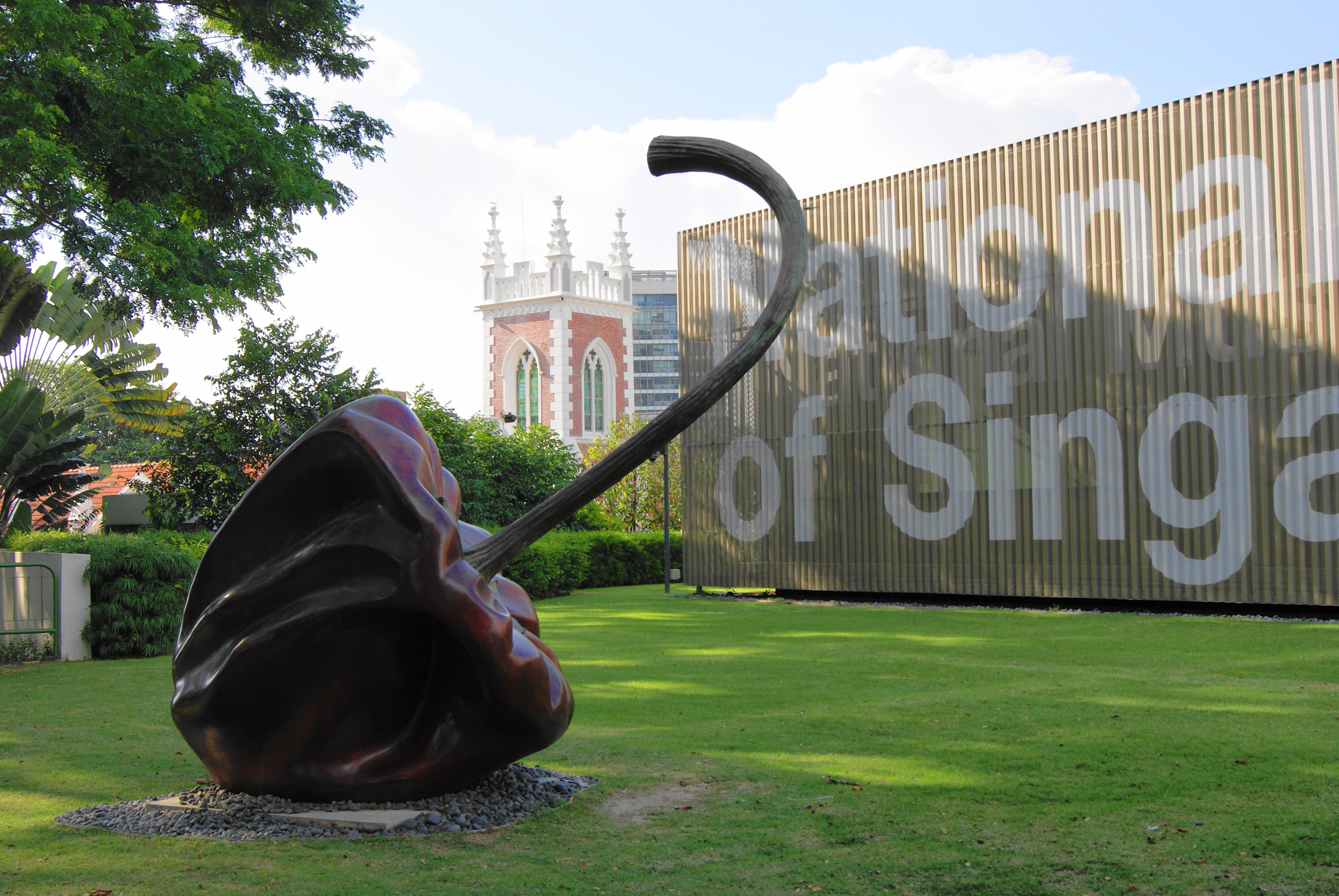
Kumari Nahappan, Pedas-Pedas, 2006, 2 m x 4 m x 3.8 m, bronze with wax covering, installation view on the grounds of the National Museum of Singapore facing Fort Canning Rise

Kumari Nahappan (born 1953) is a Malaysian-born Singaporean contemporary artist best known for her large-scale public sculptures that often depict natural subjects such as fruit, seeds, and spices. Aside from sculpture and public art, Nahappan's interdisciplinary practice also spans installation and abstract painting.

Her most well-known public sculptures in Singapore include Saga (2007) for Changi Airport Terminal 3, Nutmeg & Mace (2009) for the ION Orchard, Pedas-Pedas (2006) for the National Museum of Singapore, and Pembungaan (2011) for OUE Bayfront. Other sculptures at sites overseas include G Tower in Kuala Lumpur, Malaysia, the J.Y. Campos Centre in Manila, the Philippines, and the Chengdu International Finance Square, China.

She has exhibited at museums such as the Mori Art Museum in Tokyo, Japan, the Seoul Arts Center in South Korea, and the Museum Rudana in Bali, Indonesia. Her work has been part of international exhibitions such as the 2013 Singapore Biennale, at the Anima Mundi collateral event in conjunction with the Venice Biennale 2017, and the Personal Structures collateral exhibition in conjunction with the Venice Biennale 2019.

== Education and personal life ==
Born in Klang, Selangor, Federation of Malaya (Malaysia) in 1953, Nahappan is of Indian ancestry, with her grandfather from Kerala and her grandmother from Andhra Pradesh, both migrating to British Malaya around 1910.

In the mid-1970s, Nahappan was trained in interior design at the Willesdon College of Technology in London. After returning to Malaysia, she taught interior design at a local university for seven years, and then pursuing an interior design career for eight. She left the corporate world in 1989, coming to Singapore with her husband. She studied fine art at the LASALLE College of the Arts, Singapore from 1991 to 1992, by then a mother of four children, later obtaining a Masters of Fine Art from the RMIT University, Melbourne.

== Career ==
Nahappan decided to become a full-time artist after relocating to Singapore at the age of 37, starting her practice with painting before embarking on her advanced diploma in fine arts at LASALLE. During her advanced diploma, she was selected by Shell as a promising artist. Founder of LASALLE, the late Brother Joseph McNally, offered Nahappan the opportunity for the first solo exhibition of her paintings.

In 1996, Nahappan exhibited alongside Chinese ink artist Cai Heng for The Mysticism of Red and Black: Kumari and Cai Heng at the Wetterling Teo Gallery. Nahappan's minimalist acrylic paintings of cadmium red were contrasted with Cai Heng's delicate monochromatic Chinese ink on paper works. Nahappan subsequently held a solo show, Almanac, at the same gallery in 1997, her paintings and mixed media collages presented as an installation. Candles were set around the paintings, and 360 test tubes were suspended in a spiral shape as the centrepiece installation. In 2001, Nahappan exhibited her work in Kuala Lumpur, Malaysia for the first time at the Singapore High Commission in 2001, presenting nine installation works. Nahappan held a solo exhibition titled A Pooja through Nature in 2004, featuring an exploration of chilli and saga seed sculptures in natural settings.

From the mid-2000s, Nahappan developed numerous public sculptures displayed across Singapore. Eight giant bronze sculptures of chillis were presented on the grounds of the Singapore Management University as part of the Singapore Art Show in 2005. She created the public sculpture Pedas-Pedas in 2006, "pedas" meaning spicy in Malay. Displayed on the grounds of the National Museum of Singapore in conjunction with its reopening in December 2006, the bronze sculpture with wax covering depicts a large red chilli pepper leaning on its side. 2007 saw the creation of Nahappan's sculptural work, Saga, on display at Changi Airport's Terminal 3. Cast in bronze and varnished in red, the large-scale saga seed serves as Nahappan's celebration of the numerous saga trees in Singapore. In 2008, Nahappan created the sculptures Singing Chillies and Sizzling for display at the Seaview Condominium, Singapore, outdoor sculptures featuring chillies in shades of red and green in various playful configurations. The large-scale sculpture Nutmeg & Mace was created for the ION Orchard in 2009.

In 2012, then secretary of state Hillary Clinton was presented one of Nahappan's red chilli pepper sculptures by Singapore's then minister of foreign affairs, K. Shanmugam, during his trip to the United States.

At the Singapore Biennale in 2013, Nahappan exhibited Anahata, an installation which comprised 4,000 kg worth of saga seeds piled together in a conical shape within the exhibition space. In 2014, Nahappan created two large bronze apple sculptures, Apollo and Artemis for the Farrer Park Hotel. In 2016, Nahappan participated in public art exhibition ENVISION: Sculptures @ the Garden City, presenting the work Road to Fifty (2015) which consisted of 50 giant fibre-glass saga seeds painted red scattered along Empress Place Lawn. The same year, an installation by Nahappan was commissioned for Once Upon A Time in Little India, the first special exhibition at the Indian Heritage Centre. The work, The Weighing Scales, featured three tonnes of saga seeds spilling out from weighing scales and down a flight of stairs at the centre, examining the vanishing trade of goldsmiths in Little India, who traditionally used saga seeds as a weighing measure for precious metals.

In 2017, Nahappan presented Chanting Rosary (2017) for the Anima Mundi collateral event in conjunction with the Venice Biennale 2017. The work featured her signature giant red saga seeds at the Palazzo Ca'Zanardi in Venice, Italy, with several seeds also installed floating along the city's canals. In 2019, Nahappan's work was exhibited at the Personal Structures collateral exhibition, organised by the European Cultural Centre and held in conjunction with the Venice Biennale 2019. For this, she exhibited Talktime (2019) at the Marinaressa Gardens in Venice, a large sculpture depicting two chilli peppers entwined. Later in 2019 for the Indian Heritage Centre exhibition From the Coromandel Coast to the Straits: Revisiting Our Tamil Heritage, Nahappan created Masala, a "spice garden" installation rendering three key spices of Tamil cuisine in sculptural form: milagai (chilli), krambu (clove) and jadikai (nutmeg).

== Art ==
Abstractions and representations of nature feature significantly in Nahappan's work. Her inspiration has also been said to come from architecture, which may be traced back to her earlier training in design and working with space. Her installations developed during her post-graduate studies drew upon the daily rituals and practices informed by her religious roots and her traditional Hindu upbringing. A number of these rituals involved seeds, pods, and the use of chilli, leading to her use of these elements in her practice. She has described her depiction of the chilli as "a metaphor for potential energies and for the unknown", and has a small garden of chilli plants of her own, often also using dried chillies procured from markets as studies for her work. Art historian T.K. Sabapathy has described her use of saga seeds as seeming to “loop back to the artist’s childhood [...] to the garden—a primary resource and locus for inaugurating her art”. The red hues of the saga seed recurs as a characteristic trait in her work, from sculptures of chilli peppers to the "pulsing reds" of her abstract paintings.

== Awards ==
In 2011, she won the Artist of the Year Award in the 15th edition of the Shanghai Art Fair. She was given the Ksatria Seni Award in 2004 by the Museum Rudana in Ubud, Bali. Nahappan has also received commendations in the Philip Morris ASEAN Art Awards in 2003 and the UOB Painting of the Year in 1998. She won Shell's “Discovery of the Year" award in 1992 while completing her advanced diploma in fine arts at LASALLE.
