= Tall Tree in the Eye =

Sculpture by Anish Kapoor in Singapore

- Artist: Anish Kapoor
- Location: 1.2833°N 103.8514°E

Tall Tree in the Eye is a 2012 sculpture by Anish Kapoor, installed in Singapore. It has 29 stainless steel spheres and was installed in 2013.
