= Raffles Place MRT station =

Mass Rapid Transit station in Singapore

Raffles Place NS26 EW14 莱佛士坊 ராஃபிள்ஸ் பிளேஸ்
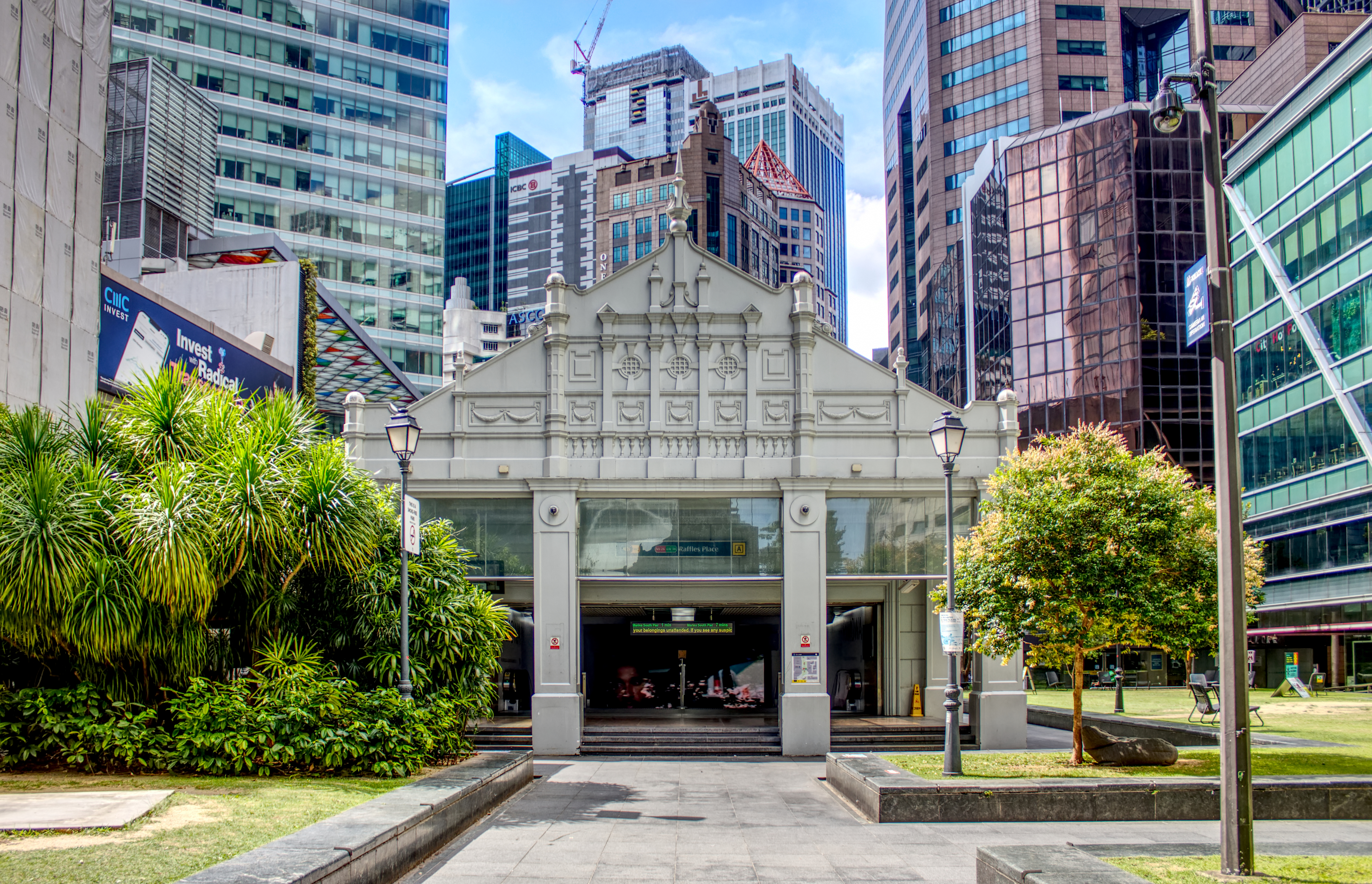
- Exit A of Raffles Place station

General information
- Location: 5 Raffles Place; Singapore 048618
- Coordinates: 1°17′2″N 103°51′5″E
- System: Mass Rapid Transit (MRT) interchange
- Operator: SMRT Trains (SMRT Corporation)
- Line: North–South Line East–West Line
- Platforms: 4 (2 island platforms)
- Tracks: 4
- Connections: DT17 Downtown; Bus, taxi

Construction
- Structure type: Underground
- Platform levels: 2
- Accessible: Yes

History
- Opened: 12 December 1987; 38 years ago
- Former names: Central

Passengers
- August 2023: 61,098 per day

Services
Preceding station	Mass Rapid Transit	Following station
City Hall towards Jurong East	North–South Line	Marina Bay towards Marina South Pier
City Hall towards Pasir Ris	East–West Line	Tanjong Pagar towards Tuas Link
Track layout
Location
- Location within Singapore Rail central area

Raffles Place MRT station is an underground Mass Rapid Transit (MRT) interchange station on the North–South Line (NSL) and East–West Line (EWL) in Singapore. Located in the Downtown Core, the station is underneath Raffles Place south of the Singapore River. The station serves various landmarks including The Fullerton Hotel, Merlion Park and the Asian Civilisations Museum and various commercial buildings such as One Raffles Place and OCBC Centre.

Initially named Central, the station was included in the early plans for the original MRT network in 1982. Construction of the tunnels between the City Hall and Raffles Place stations required the draining of the Singapore River. The station opened on 12 December 1987 with the MRT extension to Outram Park station. Like the adjacent City Hall station, cross-platform transfers between the NSL and EWL began on 28 October 1989, ahead of the split of the MRT network into two lines on 4 November.

The station has ten entrances, three of which adopt colonial-style facades. Three artworks are displayed at the station: two murals by Lim Sew Yong and Thang Kiang How depict scenes of Singapore's history, while Aw Tee Hong's sculpture draws inspiration from Chinese junks.

== History ==
The station, then named Central, was included in the early plans of the MRT network in May 1982. It was renamed Raffles Place in November that year as the business district it serves would be called as such. Raffles Place station was constructed as part of the Phase I MRT segment from the Novena to Outram Park stations, which was scheduled to be completed by December 1987. Phase I was prioritised as it passes through areas that had a higher demand for public transport, such as the densely populated housing estates of Toa Payoh and Ang Mo Kio and the Central Area. The line aimed to relieve the traffic congestion on the Thomson–Sembawang road corridor.

Train services commenced on 12 December 1987 when the line extension to Outram Park station was completed. The station was part of a route that ran continuously from Yishun station in the north to Lakeside station in the west. From 28 October 1989, it serves as the interchange station for both the East–West (EWL) and North–South (NSL) lines with the split of MRT operations. (Note: The MRT system was split into EWL (running from Tanah Merah station to Lakeside) and the NSL (running from Yishun station to Marina Bay).)

=== Station construction ===
The contract for the construction of the station was awarded to a joint venture comprising Taisei Corporation, Shimizu Corporation, and Marubeni for S$70.723 million (US$92 million in 2021) in May 1984. Construction of the station began on 28 May. With a short construction schedule, the various stages of construction had to be overlapped. This required coordination between various subcontractors while overcoming space constraints at the site as the station was built right in the city centre. The buildings of the Standard Chartered Bank and the Indian Overseas Bank had to be demolished as well as an underground carpark. During the diversion of utilities at the site, the contractors used the utilities departments' records to determine their location; they were found to be inaccurate and outdated during surveying.

The soil at the site consisted of silty clay in between sandstone with boulders of varying sizes. With the high-rise buildings in the area, it was difficult to determine suitable locations for the installation of temporary ground support systems (including the piles and working deck). About 450 piles were installed in pre-bored holes that supported the station's temporary work deck covering 40% of the site. The piles installation via rock augers penetrating into boulders was reinforced by using a "down-the-hole" (DTH) percussion machine.

Before the piles were installed, grout was injected via a central tube in the rock auger to stabilise the soil. Due to the instability of the rock auger when drilling into the boulders, the size of the drilling holes had to be minimised as much as possible. The DTH machine pre-bored the holes before allowing the augers to drill into the ground; this slowed down drilling rates. As the DTH machine was intended to drill in only hard ground, it became bogged in wet weather because it was unable to discharge the drill cuttings (mud slurry). An air lift and a tremie pipe at the bottom of the drilling hole were used to remove the mud slurry. During the station's excavation, the boulders were broken apart through treatment with a cracking agent, hydraulic rock splitters or giant breakers. Some boulders were removed via explosives; this was used with caution due to the surrounding buildings.

In conjunction with the station's opening, private developers constructed newer buildings that re-established Raffles Place area as a financial hub. The presence of the MRT station near these buildings also created additional convenience for corporations and banks operating in the area.

=== Construction of tunnels ===
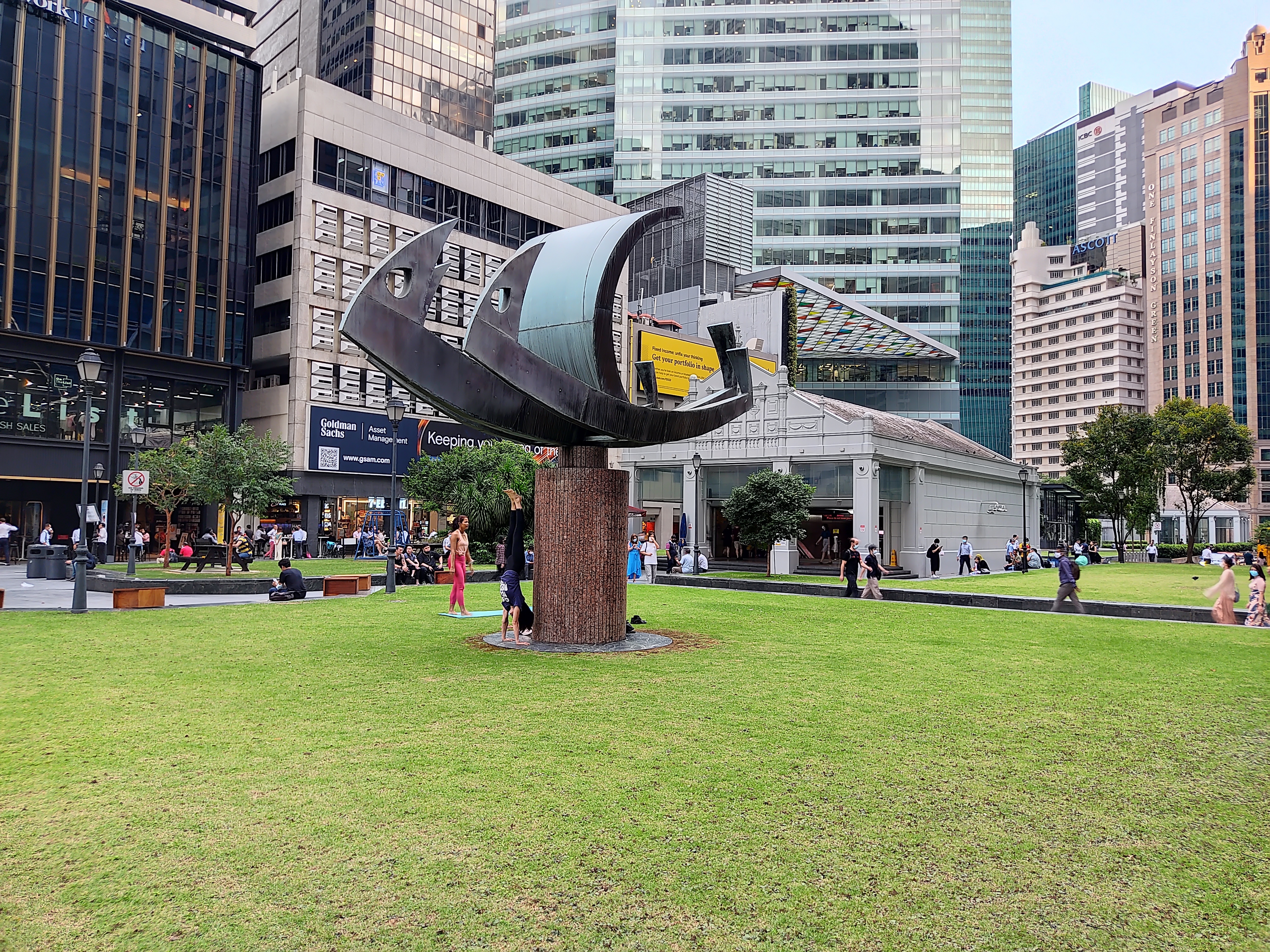
Aw Tee Hong's Struggle for Survival displayed outside of the station

The contract for the construction of four 800-metre (870 yd) tunnels between the City Hall and Raffles Place stations was awarded to a joint venture between Kajima Corporation and Keppel Shipyard in October 1983 for S$35.65 million (US$48 million in 2021). Another contract for the construction of 2.3-kilometre (1.4-mile) tunnels between the Maxwell (now Tanjong Pagar) and Raffles Place stations was awarded to a joint Japanese consortium including Taisei, Shimizu, and Marubeni in December that year. The S$63.388 million (US$84 million in 2021) contract included the construction of the adjacent Maxwell station.

The tunnel route to Tanjong Pagar station goes along Robinson Road. Cement grouting was used to strengthen the soil along the road so that the buildings above ground remained unaffected by the works underneath. Ground treatment of the soil began on 28 May 1984 and was completed by April the following year.

The construction of tunnels between the City Hall and Raffles Place stations required the draining of the Singapore River. The contractor used the cut-and-cover construction method since the tunnels, which cross over one another, would pass through a shallow part of the river. The tunnel boring machine was launched from the Empress Place building located by the river bank. Due to the acidity of the Singapore River, a layer of concrete was added to the frame around the tunnels, with a waterproofing additive for the base slab concrete. The frame was designed to prevent any corrosion and floatation of the tunnels.

As the Ministry of Environment required that the work site did not occupy more than 40% of the river width, the work was originally planned to proceed in three stages. The cofferdam in the first stage occupied about 20 metres (66 ft) of the river width from the riverbank at the Immigration Building site of the Empress Place. However, this restriction led to a limited work area. The installation of piles was hindered by the boulders in the river, which had to be drilled through. The works were close to the historical monuments of the Immigration Building and the Cavenagh Bridge. These two sites was closely monitored for any ground movement. Monitoring instruments such as inclinometers and levelling pins were used to detect any structural movement.

There were concerns that the Cavenagh Bridge would not be able to absorb any significant strains with the settlement of the bridge's anchor blocks. Saddles, joined by prestressing cables, were placed on either side of the bridge to unload and loosen the links and bridge wedges. However, these wedges could not be loosened. Instead, other temporary supports were placed to relieve any stress on the bridge. After finding some cracks on the entrance façade of the Immigration Building, the contractors underpinned the columns at the entrance.

After a seven-month delay, the first stage of the construction was completed in May 1985. To speed up the construction, the Environment Ministry agreed to lift workspace restrictions. The rest of the construction was completed in one stage, taking up the remaining 70 metres (230 ft) of the river width. The subsequent stage also used fewer piles with the mixed use of cut slopes. Installation of the second stage cofferdam began in May and works were completed within 12 months.

== Station details ==
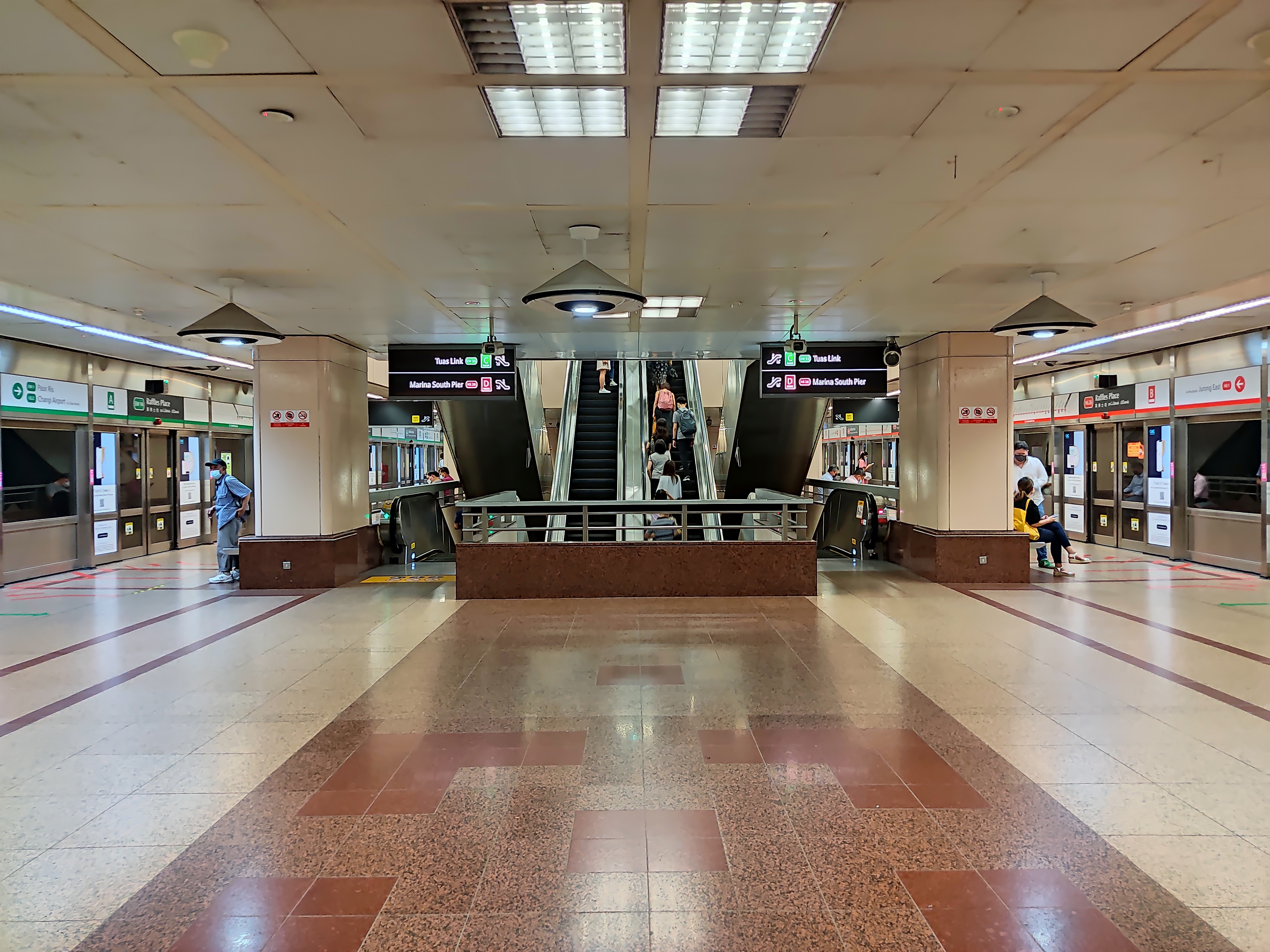
Platforms A and B (upper platform level) of the station serving the NSL northbound and EWL eastbound services

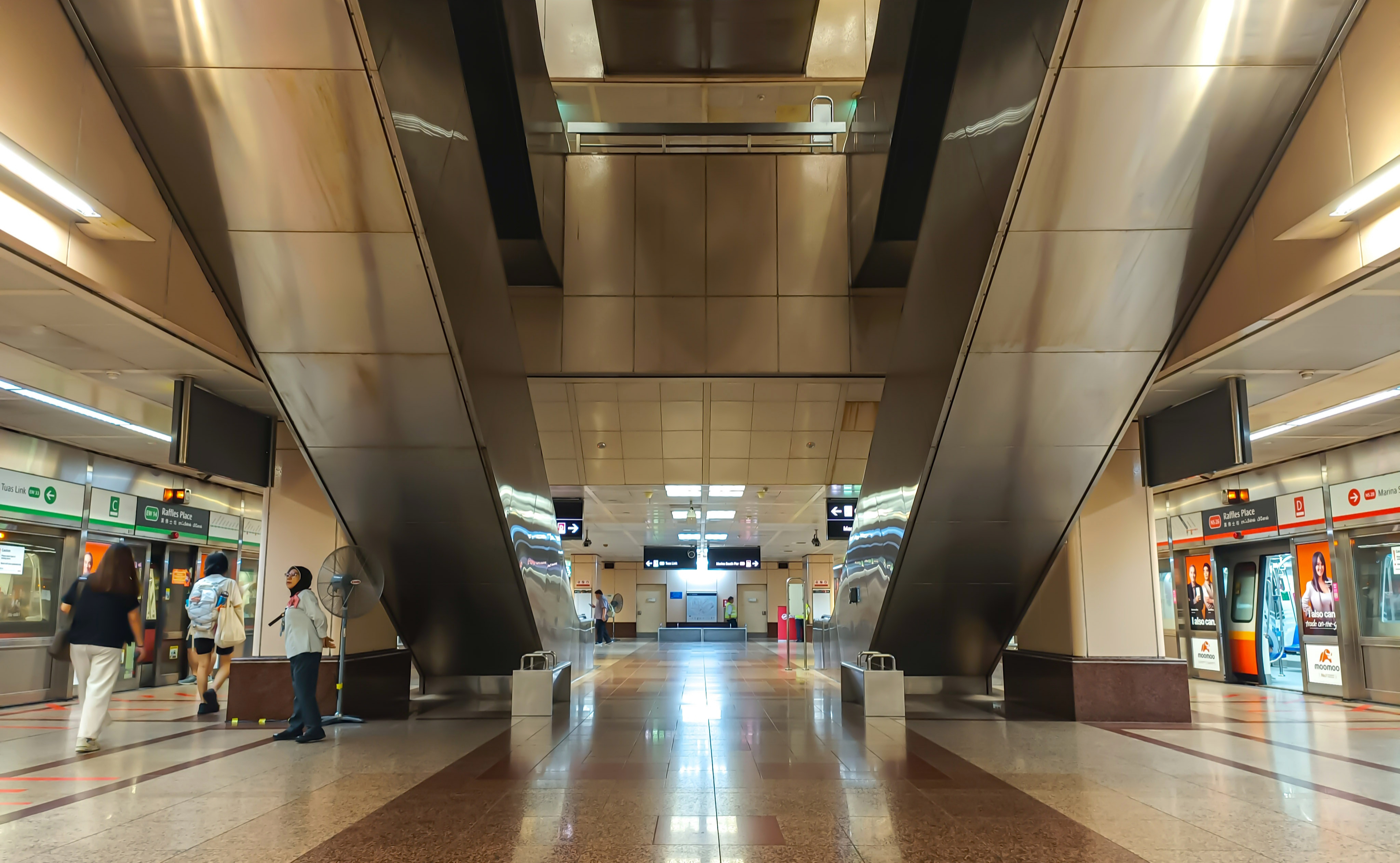
Platforms C and D (lower platform level) of the station serving the NSL southbound and EWL westbound services

Raffles Place station is one of two stations which are paired cross-platform interchanges between the NSL and EWL. From the north, the station is after City Hall station. To the south, both lines diverge from this station, with the NSL going towards Marina Bay station while the EWL goes towards Tanjong Pagar station. The official station code is NS26/EW14. When it opened, it had the station code of C1 before being changed to its current station code in August 2001 as a part of a system-wide campaign to cater to the expanding MRT System. It is within walking distance to the Downtown and Telok Ayer stations on the Downtown Line.

Like the adjacent City Hall station, Raffles Place has two platform levels to facilitate its role as an interchange between the NSL and EWL. Before the MRT eastern extension to Tanah Merah station and the Marina Bay southern extension on 4 November 1989, through services operated from the Yishun to Lakeside stations. A few days before the opening of the MRT extension, transfer drills were launched on 28 October for commuters to familiarise themselves with transferring between the two services – passengers from Yishun have to alight at either Raffles Place or City Hall to continue their journey to Lakeside or vice versa. In addition to advertisement campaigns and guides about the transfers, Mass Rapid Transit Corporation (MRTC) staff were deployed at the platforms to help commuters.

With an additional shopping floor, the station has a total of four basement levels. Raffles Place is one of the first nine underground MRT stations designated as a Civil Defence (CD) shelter. As a CD shelter, the station has to be structurally reinforced against bomb attacks with layers of earth-backed, air-backed and airtight walls and slabs. Raffles Place station has ten entrances; Three of the entrances' facades are inspired by various colonial-style buildings that once existed in the area, such as the John Little department store building and the old Mercantile Bank. These entrances serve various landmarks and commercial developments in the area including Raffles Place Park, Merlion Park, Asian Civilisations Museum, Telok Ayer Market, The Fullerton Hotel, One Raffles Place, Prudential Tower, OCBC Centre, SGX Centre and Raffles Quay.

Two murals by Lim Sew Yong and Thang Kiang How are displayed at the station, as part of the MRTC's S$2 million (US$2 million in 2021) commission of artworks at six MRT stations along the NSL. These murals on vitreous enamel panels depict scenes of Singapore's history. A brass sculpture, Struggle for Survival by Aw Tee Hong, is displayed outside the station. The sculpture takes inspiration from the Chinese junks and the perahu, linked to people's livelihoods of Singapore's past. The artist felt the ships best reflected Singapore's pioneering spirit through the hardship the early immigrants faced and decided to incorporate the shapes into the work.

Located at the entrance of Raffles Place station, Rosa Serra's Symphony is a sculpture donated by City Developments Limited (CDL), which originally commissioned the piece for its flagship skyscraper, Republic Plaza. Utilizing Serra’s hallmark fluid style to convey movement, the work serves as a tribute to the people who transformed Singapore into a global hub. The sculpture features two distinct spheres: the lower one commemorates the nation's past milestones, while the upper sphere represents its aspirations for the future.

== Notes and references ==
=== Bibliography ===
- Information Portfolio. Singapore: Mass Rapid Transit Corporation. 1984.
- Mass Rapid Transit System: Proceedings of the Singapore Mass Rapid Transit Conference. Singapore: Mass Rapid Transit Corporation. 1987. ISBN 9971-84-636-5. OCLC 82363485.
