= The Magnificent Bull =

Sculpture by Walter Matia in Singapore

The Magnificent Bull is a sculpture by Walter Matia, installed in Singapore. The bronze bull is installed in the Golden Garden at Gardens by the Bay. According to Time Out Singapore, the work "is a symbol of strength and vigour, representing Singapore's bullish economy".
