= Sugo Marinetti =

Sauce in Italian cuisine

Sugo Marinetti (Italian: Marinetti sauce) is a sauce in Italian cuisine made of tomato, anchovies, sauteed artichokes, ham, and chopped pistachios, and named after Futurist cooking proponent Filippo Tommaso Marinetti. It was created by Amedeo Pettini, a former royal chef and an editor of La Cucina Italiana, for a cooking contest sponsored by an Italian pasta company.
