= 24 Hours in Singapore =

Sculpture by Baet Yeok Kuan in Singapore

- 24 Hours in Singapore outside the Asian Civilisations Museum
- Artist: Baet Yeok Kuan
- Medium: Stainless steel sculpture
- Location: 1.28698°N 103.85201°E

24 Hours in Singapore is a sculpture by Baet Yeok Kuan, installed in Singapore.

== Description ==
The five stainless steel spheres are installed outside the Asian Civilisations Museum. The work has been described as "interactive". The spheres play audio recordings of daily life such as traffic and trains.

== History ==
The work was commissioned by the Public Art Trust.

== Reception ==
In 2023 list of Singapore's "most iconic public sculptures", Dewi Nurjuwita of Time Out Singapore said, "They're a unique addition to the lush greenery. But here's a fact you may not know: they are more than just one of the city's coolest Instagram props. These sculptures by Baet Yeok Kuan are interactive installations that act as an audio time capsule, capturing the sounds of Singapore."
