= First Generation (sculpture) =

Bronze sculpture by Singaporean sculptor Chong Fah Cheong

Coordinates: 1°17′11.5″N 103°51′08.2″E

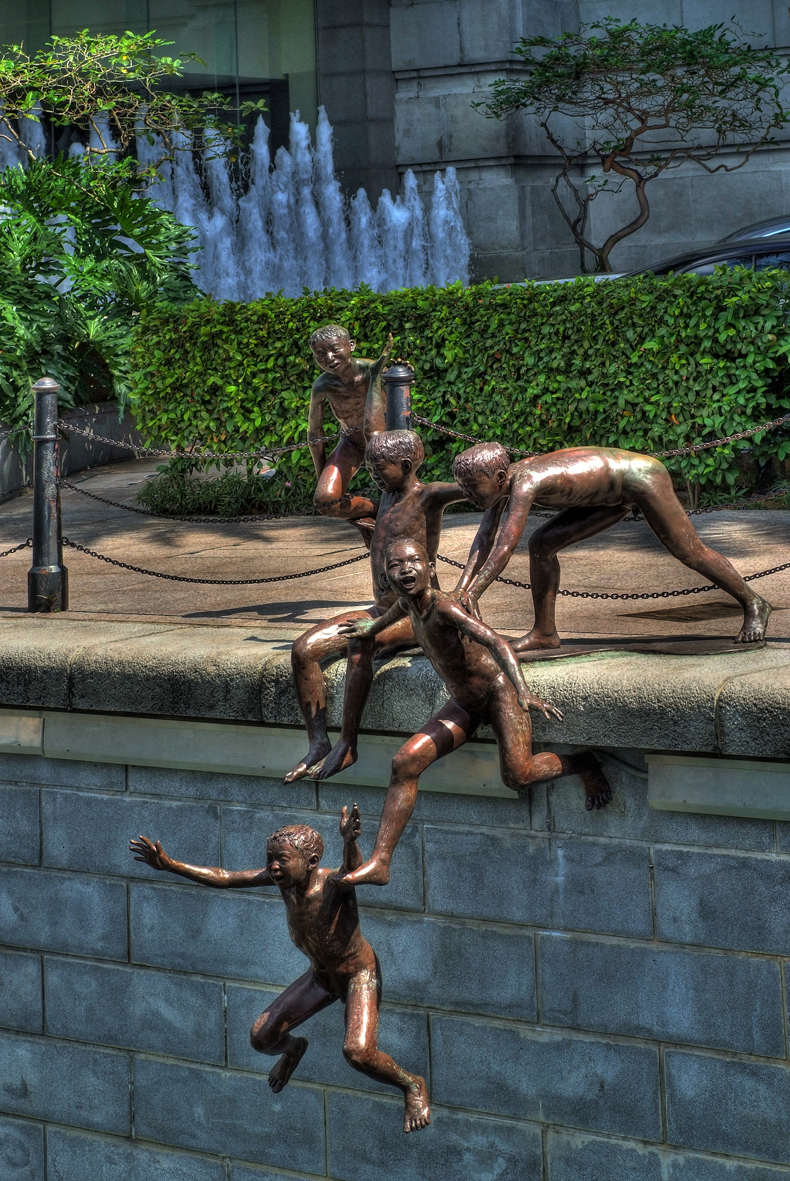
- First Generation, near Cavenagh Bridge in Singapore
- Artist: Chong Fah Cheong
- Completion date: 31 December 2000
- Medium: Bronze
- Subject: 5 boys jumping in the river
- Location: Singapore

First Generation is a bronze sculpture by Singaporean sculptor Chong Fah Cheong. The sculpture was created as part of a series of sculptures by various sculptors, in the Open Air Interpretative Centre project by the Singapore Tourism Board. Chong's sculpture was the first to be unveiled on 31 December 2000.
