= Han Sai Por =

Singaporean sculptor (born 1943)

- 韩少芙
- Born: Han Sai Por; 19 July 1943 (age 83); Japanese-occupied Singapore
- Education: Nanyang Academy of Fine Arts (1968); East Ham College of Art (1980); Wolverhampton College of Art (B.A. (Hons.) (Fine Art), 1983); Lincoln University
- Notable work: Seed Series (1998); 20 Tonnes (2002)
- Movement: Postmodernism
- Awards: Cultural Medallion for Art (1995); winner, drawing and sculpture section, XI Triennale – India (New Delhi, 2005); Outstanding City Sculpture Award (China, 2006)

Chinese name
- Traditional Chinese: 韓少芙
- Simplified Chinese: 韩少芙
Transcriptions
Standard Mandarin
- Hanyu Pinyin: Hán Shào Fú
Southern Min
- Hokkien POJ: Hân Siáu-phû
- Website: www.hansaipor.com

Han Sai Por (Chinese: 韓少芙; born 19 July 1943) is a Singaporean sculptor and artist. A graduate of the Nanyang Academy of Fine Arts (NAFA), East Ham College of Art, Wolverhampton College of Art (now the School of Art and Design of the University of Wolverhampton), and Lincoln University, New Zealand, she worked as a teacher and later as a part-time lecturer at NAFA, the LASALLE-SIA College of the Arts, and the National Institute of Education, Nanyang Technological University, before becoming a full-time artist in 1997.

Han has participated in exhibitions locally and abroad, including events in China, Denmark, Japan, Malaysia, New Zealand, and South Korea. Her first solo exhibition, entitled Four Dimensions, was held at the National Museum Art Gallery in 1993. Her sculptures can be found around the world, in Osaka and Shōdoshima, Kagawa Prefecture, in Japan; Kuala Lumpur and Sarawak in Malaysia; and Washington, D.C., in Singapore, sculptures commissioned from her can be seen at Capital Tower, the Defence Science Organisation National Laboratories, the Esplanade – Theatres on the Bay, the National Museum of Singapore, Revenue House, Singapore Changi Airport Terminal 3, Suntec City Mall, and Woodlands Regional Library. In 2001, Han was the founding President of the Sculpture Society (Singapore) and remains its Honorary President. She was the first artist in residence at the Society's Sculpture Pavilion at Fort Canning Park in 2009, where she worked on sculptures made from the trunks of tembusu trees.

Han is probably best known for her stone sculptures with organic forms, examples of which include Growth (1985), Spirit of Nature (1988), Object C (1992), and Seeds (2006). The last work, presently located in the grounds of the National Museum, consists of two large kernels carved from sandstone excavated from Fort Canning Hill during the Museum's redevelopment. However, her oeuvre is broad, and includes Four Dimensions (1993), a collection of geometrical structures, and 20 Tonnes (2002), also installed at the Museum, which consists of a row of six ridged monolithic blocks with a smaller block at either end, all hewn from a single granite rock.

For her contributions to art, Han was conferred the Cultural Medallion for Art in 1995. She was also the winner of the sculpture and painting section at the 11th Triennale – India organized by the Lalit Kala Akademi (National Academy of Art of India) in 2005, and the Outstanding City Sculpture Award in China the following year. In 2014, she was inducted into the Singapore Women's Hall of Fame.

== Early life and education ==
Han Sai Por was born on 19 July 1943 in Singapore during the Japanese occupation. She was one of six children of a poor couple, and her family were squatters living in Changi in a house made of cardboard boxes and coconut leaves. Nonetheless, Han had a happy childhood, and went to a nearby beach to make figurine animals out of sand. This experience helped her to appreciate nature and instilled in her a sense of adventure and exploration. At ten years of age, Han was introduced to Michelangelo's sculptures through a book given to her by her mother.

Han was educated at Yock Eng High School (now Yuying Secondary School) and subsequently at the Singapore Teachers' Training College between 1965 and 1968. While working as a teacher, she attended part-time courses at the Nanyang Academy of Fine Arts (NAFA) from 1975 to 1977. Having saved some money, she went to the United Kingdom where she studied fine art at the East Ham College of Art (1979–1980) and the Wolverhampton College of Art (1980–1983), receiving a B.A. (Hons.) in Fine Art from the latter. She worked as a cook, hotel maid, waitress, and street artist to support herself.

Han returned to Singapore in 1983 and was one of the two pioneer teachers appointed to the new Arts Elective Programme at the Nanyang Girls' High School. In 1987, to support her personal artistic endeavours, Han also began to teach part-time at NAFA, the LASALLE-SIA College of the Arts (both 1987–1993), and the National Institute of Education, Nanyang Technological University (1994–1996). Subsequently, she pursued further studies in landscape architecture at Lincoln University in Lincoln, Canterbury, in New Zealand.

== Artistic career ==
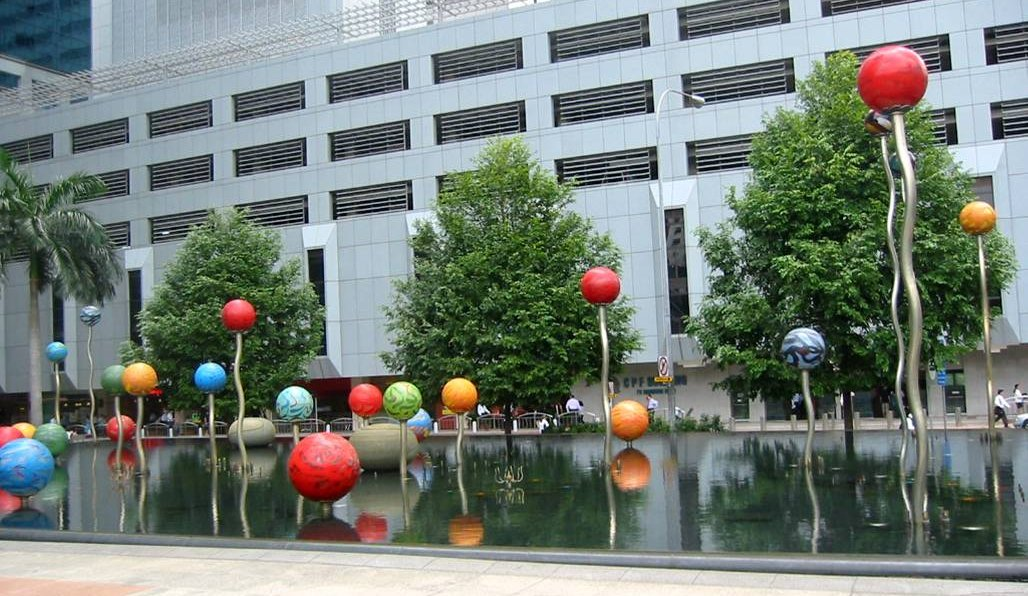
Shimmering Pearls I (1999), Han's first work in glass, in front of Capital Tower, pictured in 2006

Han has participated in exhibitions locally and abroad, including events in China, Denmark, Japan, Malaysia, New Zealand, and South Korea. Over 24 hours between New Year's Eve 1989 and New Year's Day 1990, she took part in The Time Show organised by The Artists Village, which has been described as "definitely a high point in the history of art in Singapore when an exceptionally wide spectrum of artists expressing in an equally wide range of mediums participated in a single art event". Han's first solo exhibition was Four Dimensions at the National Museum Art Gallery from 18 to 28 February 1993. Other solo shows she has given in Singapore are Rainforest (Plastique Kinetic Worms, 1999) and 20 Tonnes – Physical Consequences (Ministry of Information, Communications and the Arts ARTrium, 2002).

Han became a full-time sculptor in 1997. Her works can be found around the world: Childhood Dream (1992) at the Uchinomi-cho Town Hall Garden on the island of Shōdoshima in Kagawa Prefecture, Japan; Pisces (1993) at the Yashiro Hoshi-no Choukoku Centre Park in Osaka, Japan; Spirit of Nature III (1990) at the Kuching Waterfront Development in Sarawak, Malaysia; Towards Peace (1987) in the Kuala Lumpur Lake Gardens, Malaysia; and Cactus, Tropical Leaves (both 1994) and The Wave of Life at the Embassy of Singapore in Washington, D.C. in Singapore, sculptures commissioned from her can be seen at Capital Tower (Shimmering Pearls I, 1999), the Defence Science Organisation National Laboratories (Tropical Brain Forest, 2003), the Esplanade – Theatres on the Bay (Seed Series, 1998), the National Museum of Singapore (20 Tonnes, 2002; and Seeds, 2006), One Marina Boulevard (Progressive Flows, 2004), Orchard MRT station (Goddess of Happiness, 1985), Revenue House (Spring, 1996), Singapore Changi Airport Terminal 3 (Flora Inspiration, 2007), Singapore Changi Airport VIP Complex (Singapore – A Garden City, 2004), Suntec City Mall (Chinese Zodiac Medallions, 1995), UOB Plaza (Two Figures, 1993), and Woodlands Regional Library (Rain Forest).

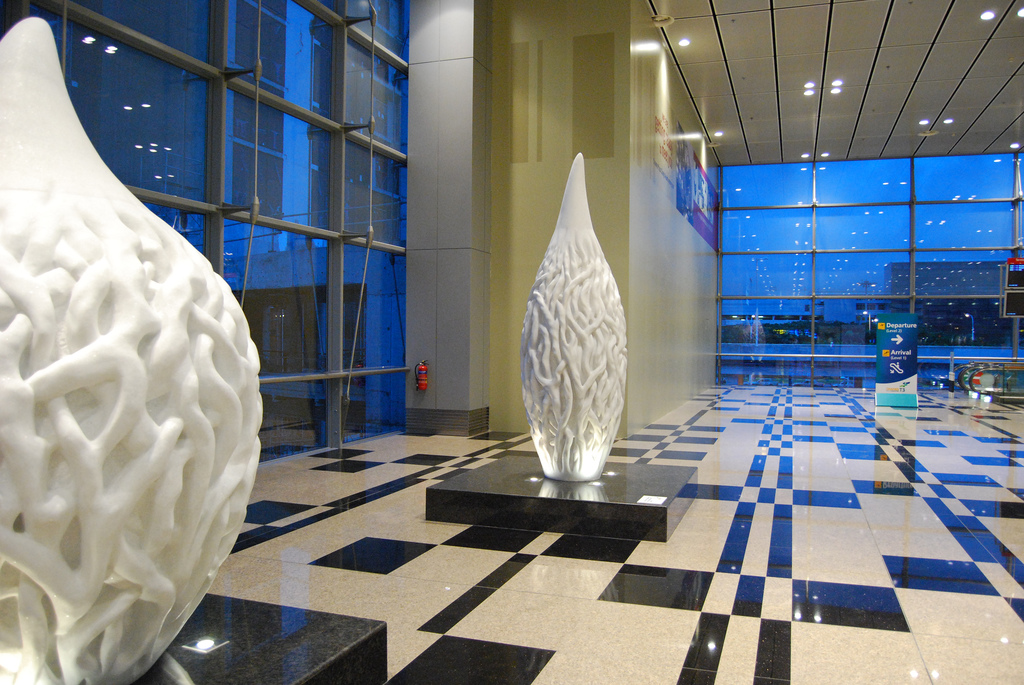
Flora Inspiration (2007) at Singapore Changi Airport Terminal 3, pictured in 2008

In 2001, Han was the founding President of the Sculpture Society (Singapore), and remains its Honorary President. In May 2009, she was the first artist in residence at the Society's Sculpture Pavilion at Fort Canning Park where she worked on sculptures made from the trunks of tembusu trees. The project, sponsored by the Asia Pacific Breweries Foundation Inspire Programme, was intended to provide sculptors and installation artists with studio space and a chance to interact with the public in a park environment. Han was a member of the Fourth Singapore Note and Coin Advisory Committee between 1 July 2008 and 30 June 2011, where her duties included advising the Monetary Authority of Singapore on designs for new currency.

In 2005, with the assistance of the National Arts Council (NAC) and the Jurong Town Corporation (JTC), she relocated from Seletar Air Base to Workloft@Wessex, a walk-up apartment in Wessex Estate which had been converted by JTC from an army camp into an artists' village. In 2006, Han held a charity arts exhibition with other artists such as Chua Ek Kay and Chng Seok Tin. The proceeds from the exhibition were donated to help victims of the 2006 Yogyakarta earthquake. In 2008, she received a S$80,000 grant by the National Arts Council as part of her receiving the Cultural Medallion. Han used this grant to create a set of works based on Singaporean flora. In 2010, Han held an exhibition titled The Changing Landscape at the Luxe Art Museum, in which she addressed deforestation and destruction in Singapore. In 2011, Han held a solo exhibition titled The Black Forest. She would remaster The Black Forest in 2013, when she held an exhibition at the NAFA Gallery called Black Forest, which had similar messages of deforestation to the 2011 exhibition. Black Forest featured a pair of charred logs lying over charcoal with stumps standing nearby.

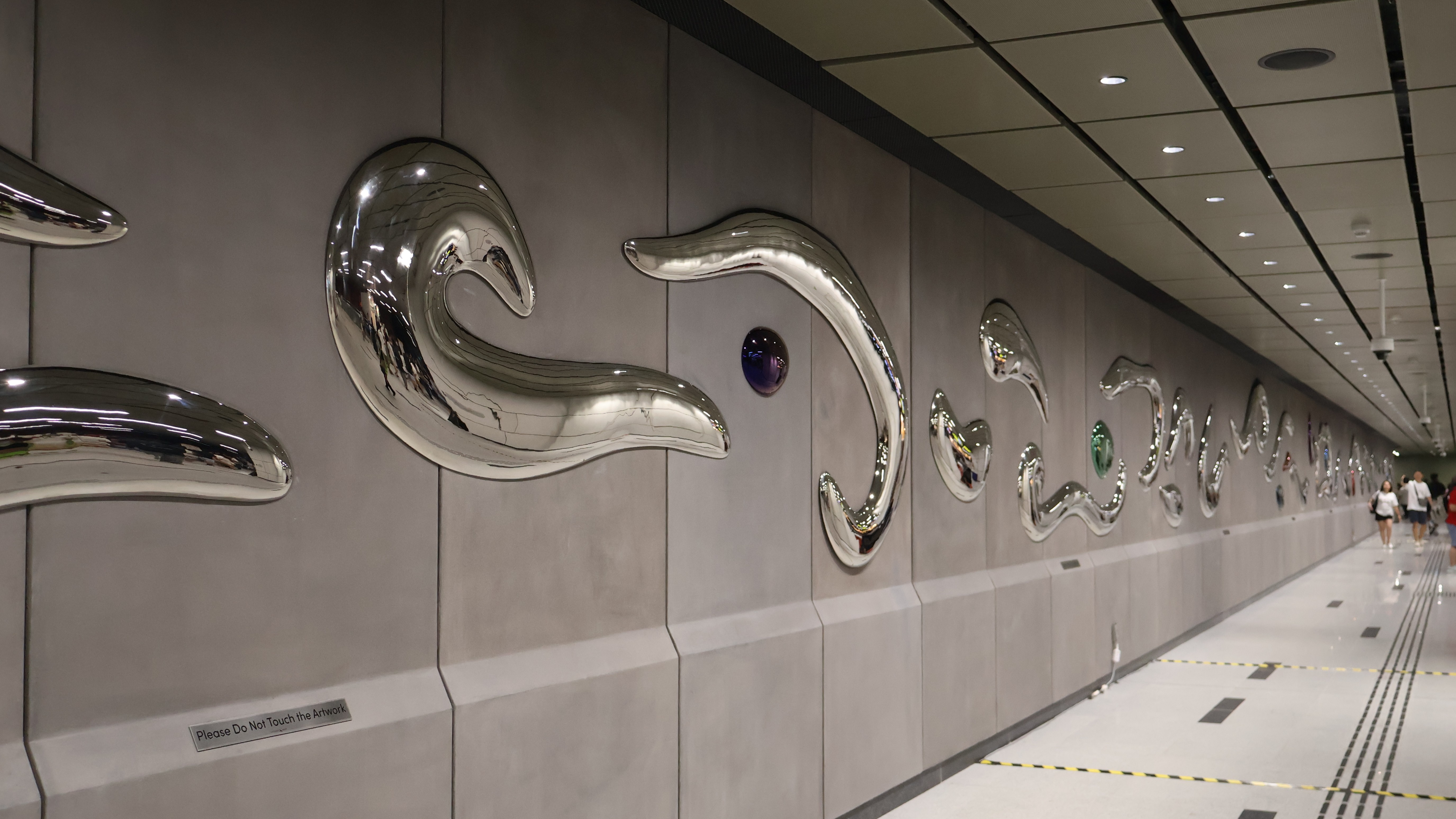
A Journey Between (2026) at Cantonment MRT station, pictured in 2026

In 2015, Han created Harvest, a work about the environment that coexists with Singapore. It was commissioned by and displayed in the Esplanade – Theatres on the Bay. During the 2016 Singapore Biennale, Han's work Black Forest was shown at the Singapore Art Museum. In 2019, after undergoing a cataract surgery, Han held a solo exhibition at iPreciation called Dance With The Wind. It featured 10 sculptures and 12 acrylic works. In 2022, she held an exhibition at the STPI - Creative Workshop & Gallery titled The Forest and Its Soul after a second residency with them; the previous one was in 2013. It featured 35 works created with laser cutting and intaligio techniques. She participated in the 2023 Singapore Art Week, displaying shoebox-sized sculptures alongside Teo Eng Seng and Vincent Liew. In 2025, during the Light To Night festival, Han displayed a 9-metre (30 ft)-tall installation at the Padang. In 2026, she created A Journey Between, a public artwork under the Art-in-Transit scheme that is located at the concourse of Cantonment MRT station. Measuring 75 metres (246 ft) long, it features large pieces of curved stainless steel sculptures, which represents the curves of the train tracks. Due to its reflectiveness, Han described the artwork as encouraging commuters to observe their reflection as if they "become part of the artwork."

== Art ==
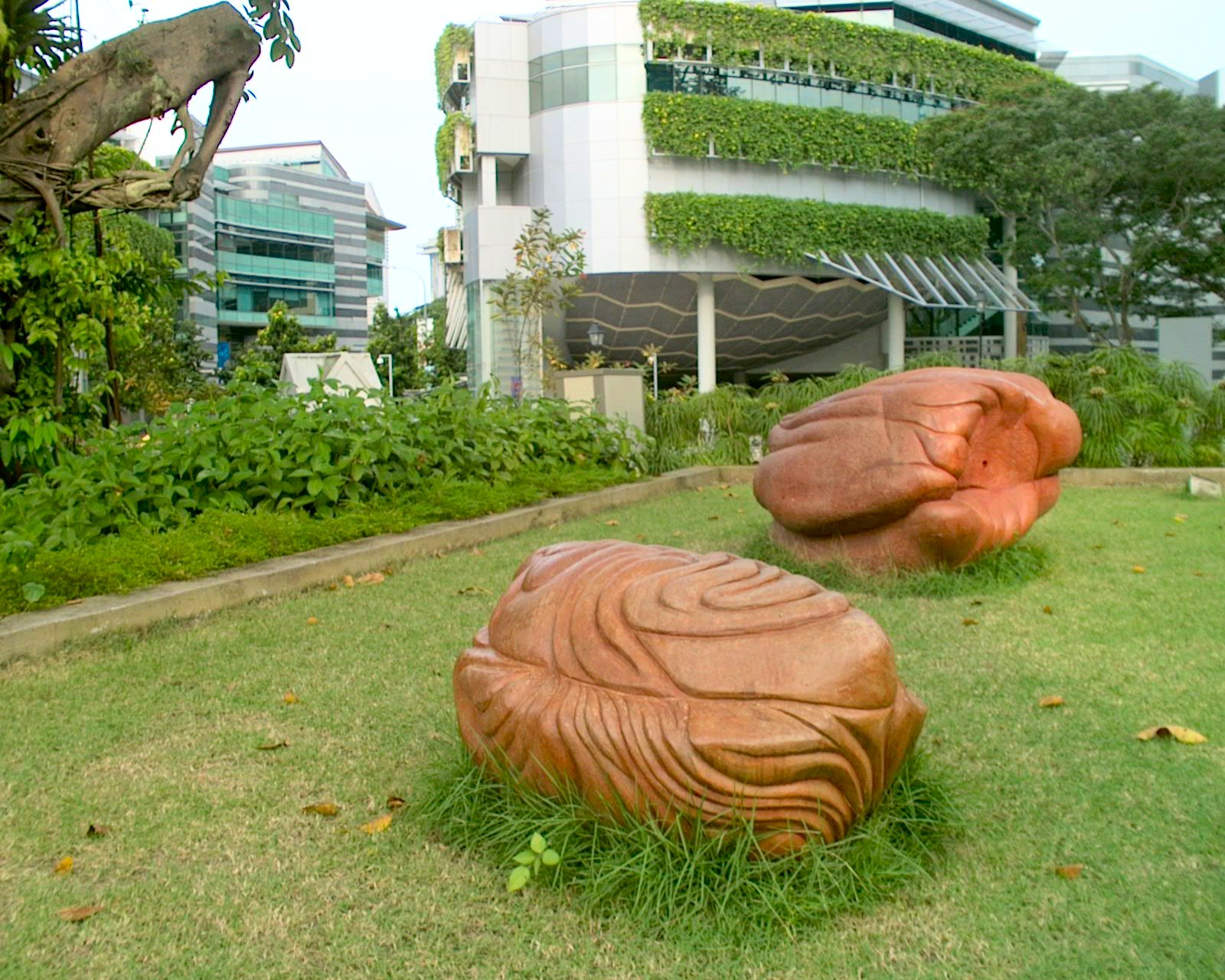
Seeds (2006) in the grounds of the National Museum of Singapore, pictured in 2009

Han is probably best known for her stone sculptures with organic forms; she sees her sculpture as having "a force or inner life inside struggling to get out". Having a preference for granite and marble, she has said: "Stone is one of my favourite materials. In the erosion of rock by wind and water are found original, vital qualities which express the significance of life." Han often purchases stone using her own resources from quarries in China, Italy, Japan, Malaysia, and Singapore. The cost of just the material for solo exhibition pieces can be up to S$20,000. Nonetheless, she is motivated by the encouragement, recognition and acknowledgement her art she receives from others. Examples of Han's sculptures of this genre include Growth (1985), a set of five pear-shaped forms in white marble; Spirit of Nature (1988), three black granite ovoid and spheroid forms; Object C (1992), a pale grey granite object resembling a canoe; and Seeds (2006), large kernels carved from sandstone excavated from Fort Canning Hill during the National Museum's redevelopment. Art historian and critic T.K. Sabapathy has commented that Han is concerned with the uneasy relation between men and nature in the modern era, and has expressed a desire for people to realize that "[we] are part of nature and not apart from nature". In addition, he has described her sculptures as "compact, entirely solid mass of material which she shapes but does not perforate or open up" and that "they [were] the outcome of a single-minded concentration on mass and volume."

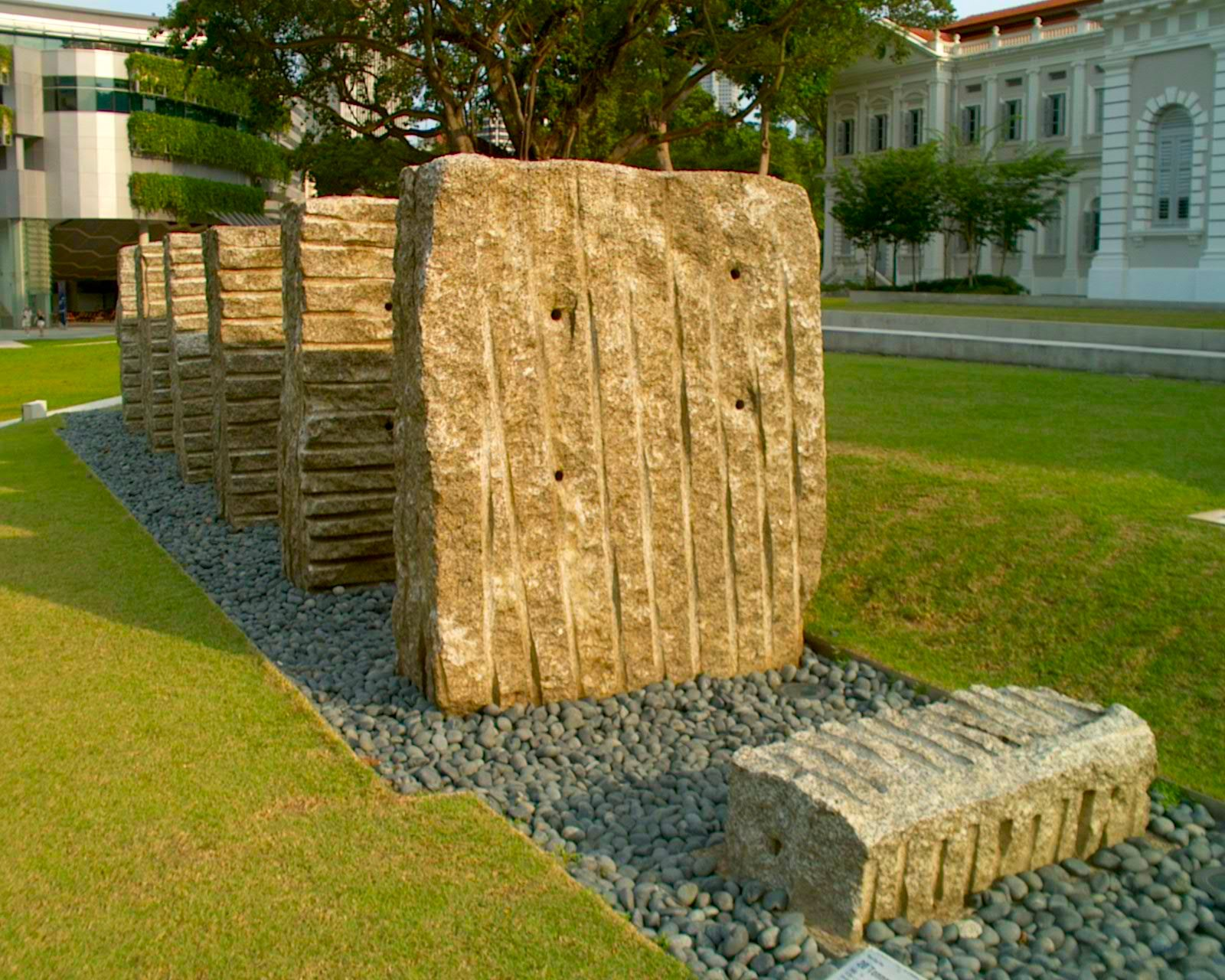
20 Tonnes (2002), pictured in 2009

Beyond Han's sculptures which embrace organic forms, she has also designed geometric pieces. Four Dimensions (1993) was made up of ten geometrical structures, including single objects (such as Tetrahedron–Tetrahedron Interpenetration) and opened-up planes (Cubic Triangle) connected with each other through the use of angles, and light and shadow. Han said: "My works are based on the concept of mathematical logic. The idea is to show how each step is based on the previous one so that the geometrical forms progress in logical sequence ... The fourth dimension is abstract. It cannot be seen or touched. It contains the feelings and talents of Mankind. We wish to possess this space and to open it up for all people to share." Sabapathy was somewhat critical of these works, saying that they dealt only with techniques and fabrication and did not "disclose fresh insights into space and its articulation". He expressed the hope that Han would stay the course and deepen her investigation beyond form into an exploration of light, colour and materials to "create environments in which form, space and time can be seen to be related in ever-changing yet intelligent systems".

20 Tonnes, first exhibited in 2002 in the atrium of the MICA Building (formerly the Old Hill Street Police Station) and now permanently installed in front of the National Museum, consists of a row of six ridged monolithic granite blocks with a smaller block at either end, all hewn from a single rock. Han called the work "an explanation of nature's physical reaction when it is impacted by force, gravity and energy", and commented: "When I am working on stone, the immediate context is physical, the force of hammering, chiseling and drilling hard stone creates heat and energy. The reaction of the particles causes sparks and waves of sound. The appearance of the stone is the result, the consequent physical reaction. Understanding the character of nature through the physical context has become part of my sculpture."

According to art curator Tay Swee Lin, Han's sculptures "exude smooth, sensual lines that are quietly engaging and tactile", and her art "is a testimony of beauty with meditative quietness belying a resilience and strength that stone and metal encompass. The artist's personal relationship with her art is one that is complete – her sculptures are crafted by hand from start to finish; painstakingly carved, sanded and polished. ... In land scarce Singapore, Han's work encapsulates the appreciation and understanding of the delicate balance of nature that exists in an urban environment." In the catalogue accompanying her Four Dimensions exhibition, Han stated: "Postmodernism accepts the facts that art does not follow any rigid man-made rules. If the artist says, 'this is art' then it is art, provided only that the artist can demonstrate a valuable idea or concept. Art needs man to judge and decide whether it is indeed art." Her 2015 work Harvest was the first in which she used stainless steel mesh in its creation. Her usual sculptures use granite, such as in her Seeds series, or wood, such as in Black Forest (2013), but the use of mesh in Harvest "evoked little of that heft." Instead, Harvest appears light or delicate due to its use of mesh. Harvest depicts creatures such as birds and fish along with plant-life, which were described as "being small, temporal and fragile" or "easily damaged and overlooked."

Beyond sculpting, Han has also created paintings, usually with acrylics. Some of her more recent exhibitions such as The Black Forest (2011) and Dance With the Wind (2019) have included both her sculptures and paintings; The Black Forest was one of her first exhibitions to have a focus on her paintings instead of her sculptures. Her paintings for The Black Forest were made in black and white, representing the exhibition's overarching message of the destruction of the environment. In Dance With the Wind, Han made 10 sculptures and 12 paintings. This exhibition also featured the use of white stone known as han bai yu, which she discovered in China. Even though this stone was more expensive than her usual medium, Han opted to use it due to its quality and purity. Her Dance With the Wind paintings depict movement, which she based on her experiences of wind and typhoons in Southern China. She attributed her lean towards creating paintings to her age and recent cataract surgery, further stating that "with sculpting, there is the cutting, noise, dust and sweat. With painting, you can sit with a fan, sit back on a sofa. Your brain calms down, it's more quiet."

== Awards and honours ==
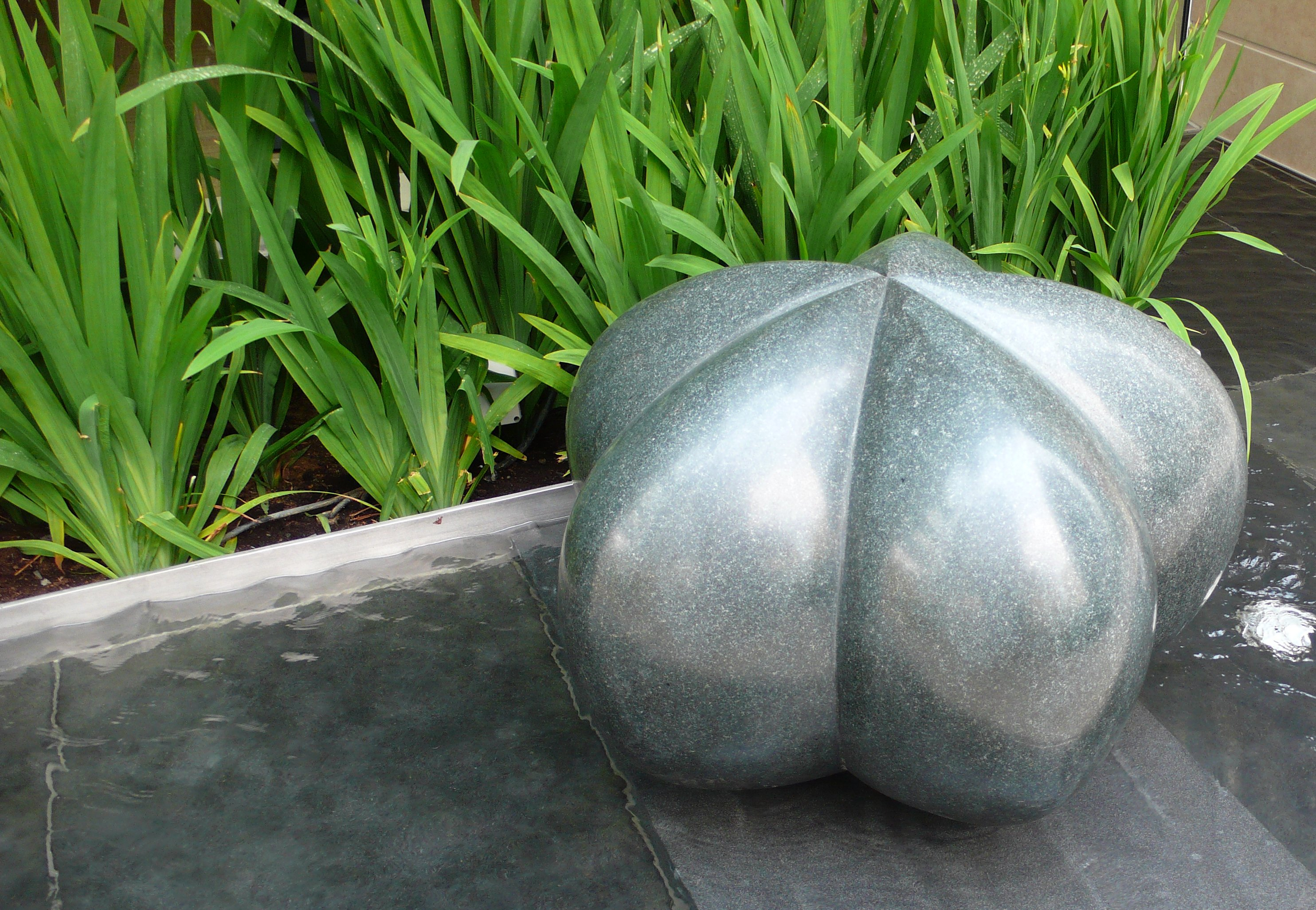
A seed sculpture by Han at the St. Regis Singapore hotel, pictured in 2008

In 1988, Han won the Best Entry Award from the Singapore National Theatre Trust for her participation in a show entitled Basics at the National Museum Art Gallery. She was awarded a scholarship for the Portland Sculpture Park on the Isle of Portland in Dorset, England, by the Arts Council of Great Britain and the National Arts Council (NAC) in 1990. Together with the installation artist S. Chandrasekaran, she helped to transform an old limestone quarry into a sculpture park, creating a work called Flow through the Rocks. In 1993 she received sponsorship from the Singapore International Foundation to attend the International Painting and Sculpture Symposium in Gulbarga (Kalburgi) in Karnataka, India, and served on the NAC's Arts Resource Panel between 1993 and 1994.

In 1995, Han was conferred the Cultural Medallion for Art by the Minister for Communications, Information and the Arts. In her award citation, she was described as "a consummate carver" with "arduous and physically demanding relationships with materials" who had "always been passionate and emphatic about sculpture". She was also a finalist for the Women Inspire Awards 2002, and the winner of the sculpture and painting section at the 11th Triennale – India organized by the Lalit Kala Akademi (National Academy of Art of India) in 2005 for her Bud, Leaf and Seed Series. The following year, she won the Outstanding City Sculpture Award in China. In September 2008, Han was one of seven Cultural Medallion winners to receive an $80,000 grant from the NAC's CM Grant programme to fund a project involving site-specific installations based on Singapore flora. In 2014, she was inducted into the Singapore Women's Hall of Fame. In 2024, Han was included in Forbes' 50 Over 50 Asia list.

== Major exhibitions ==
Dates	Title	Medium	Location	Ref.
1985	2nd Asian Art Show		Fukuoka Art Museum; Fukuoka, Japan	
1985	Singapore Sculpture Exhibition	Sculpture	National Museum Art Gallery; Singapore	
1986	Contemporary Asian Art Show		National Museum of Modern Art; Seoul, South Korea	
1987	Towards Peace: 5th Asian Sculpture Symposium	Sculpture	Kuala Lumpur, Malaysia	
1988	Basics	Sculpture	National Museum Art Gallery; Singapore	
1989	3rd Asian Art Show		Fukuoka Art Museum; Fukuoka, Japan	
September 1989	Six Men Sculpture Exhibition	Sculpture	Orchard Point Exhibition Hall; Singapore	
16 November – 15 December 1991	Sculpture in Singapore	Sculpture	National Museum Art Gallery; Singapore	
1991	Quarry Art Exhibition	Sculpture	British Council; Singapore	
1992	Shodoshima International Sculpture Symposium	Sculpture	Shōdoshima, Kagawa Prefecture, Japan	
18–28 February 1993	Four Dimensions (solo exhibition)	Sculpture installation	National Museum Art Gallery; Singapore	
22 May – 6 June 1993	ESPACE 3356		Raffles City Atrium and The Substation Gallery, Singapore	
1993	Yashiro International Sculpture Symposium	Sculpture	Yashiro, Hyōgo Prefecture, Japan	
1996	Højer International Sculpture Symposium	Sculpture (Wonder Wall, Vejle)	Højer, Denmark	
1997	International Snow Sculpture	Sculpture	Quebec, Canada	
29 August– 11 October 1998	IMPRINTS on Singapore Art: Works of 40 Nafa Artists	Sculpture	Singapore Art Museum; Singapore	
1999	Rainforest (solo exhibition)	Charcoal and ink drawings, sculpture	Plastique Kinetic Worms; Singapore	
1999	Volume and Form	Sculpture	Singapore	
2000	Art in the Park 2000	Sculpture (Fern)	Christchurch, New Zealand	
2000	Orchid Journey	Sculpture installation	Suzhou, Jiangsu, China	
12 September– 18 November 2001	Pulp Friction: Materials in Contemporary Art	Sculpture	Singapore Art Museum; Singapore	
21 June 2002	Borrowed Scenery	Site-specific work	Indonesia	
13–24 March 2002	20 Tonnes – Physical Consequences (solo exhibition)	Sculpture installation	Ministry of Information, Communications and the Arts ARTrium; Singapore	
2003	Yogyakarta Arts Festival	Sculpture (Inside the Bamboo Forest)	Yogyakarta, Indonesia	
14 January – 10 February 2005	XI Triennale – India	Drawings, sculpture	Crafts Museum; New Delhi, India	
30 March – 20 May 2005	Selected Artworks by Han Sai Por and Ahmad Osni Peii	Sculpture	Sculpture Square; Singapore	
13 January – 5 March 2006	1 Singapore Artist: Han Sai Por (solo exhibition)	Sculpture	Sculpture Square; Singapore	
20 December 2008– 17 January 2009	Nanyang 70 Years After: A Reunion of Artists in the Academy	Sculpture	Nanyang Academy of Fine Arts; Singapore	
2011	The Black Forest	Sculpture, paintings	Esplanade – Theatres on the Bay; Singapore	
2013	Black Forest	Sculpture installation	NAFA Galleries 1 and 2 Singapore	
15 January – 22 February 2014	Moving Forest	Sculpture, paintings	STPI - Creative Workshop & Gallery; Singapore	
2015	Harvest	Sculpture	Esplanade – Theatres on the Bay; Singapore	
5–20 July 2019	Dance With the Wind	Sculpture, paintings	iPreciation; Singapore	
2022	The Forest and Its Soul	Sculpture, paintings	STPI - Creative Workshop & Gallery; Singapore	

== Works ==
- Han, Sai Por (1993), Four Dimensions: A Sculptural Installation, Singapore: Sheen's Gallery, ISBN 978-981-00-4392-6.
- Han, Sai Por (2002), Sculpture, Singapore: Art-2 Gallery, OCLC 225985814.
- Han, Sai Por (2005), Han Sai Por, Singapore: National Arts Council, OCLC 233928427.
