= Julien Marinetti =

French painter, sculptor and visual artist

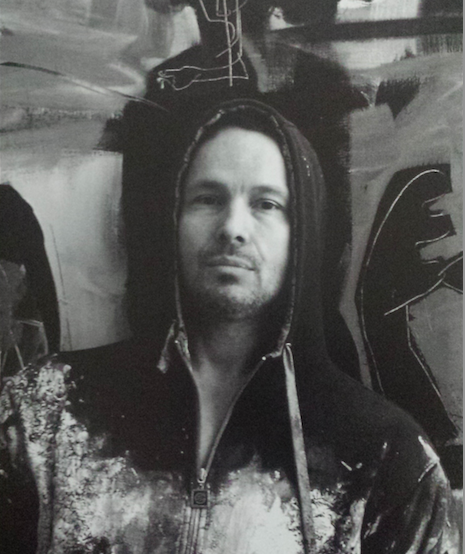
Julien Marinetti in 2014

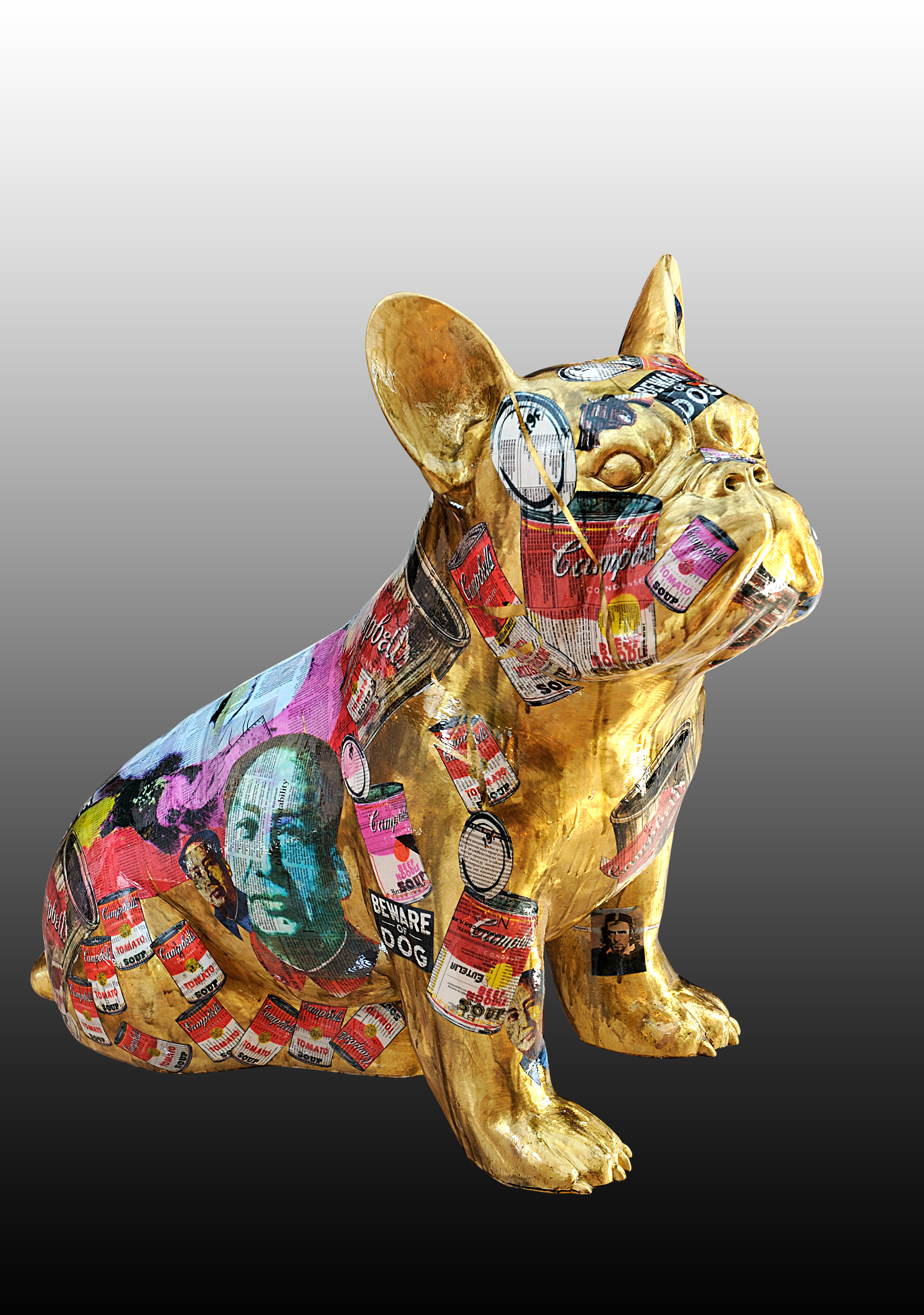
Doggy John Warhol by Julien Marinetti

Julien Marinetti (born 1967) is a French painter, sculptor and visual artist. He is the creator of "Doggy John" series of sculptures.

== Biography ==
Julien Marinetti was born on 19 January 1967, in Paris. He spent his childhood in the neighborhood of Saint-Germain-des-Prés, next to the School of Fine Arts, which he attended a few years later. He also worked at the workshops of artists Paul Belmondo and Edmond Heuzé, in the same area.

Later, he studied the nude at the Académie de la Grande Chaumière and developed a great interest in the academic drawing.

In 1997, a meeting with the painter Jean Dewasne became a turning point for Marinetti. He discovered the constructive abstraction concepts and antisculptures. Not only the represented object is important but the additional treatment on it (such as paintings)..

His first exhibitions in the 1990s (Salon des Independants, Salon de la Jeune Peinture etc.) were focused on the reinterpretation of the major issues of religious painting - Crucifixion, Transfiguration, Adam and Eve in different styles; classicism, realism, figuration libre.

In 2004, he returned to sculpture and invented "Doggy John", a bronze bulldog on which he applies a pictorial treatment, mixing painting and sculpture. He developed a syncretism of art where the sculpture is not a figurative object by itself but becomes the support of a pictorial work. In 2007, his work "Doggy John-Obama" was presented at the Grand Palais. Since then, his sculptures have been exhibited in several countries and galleries worldwide.

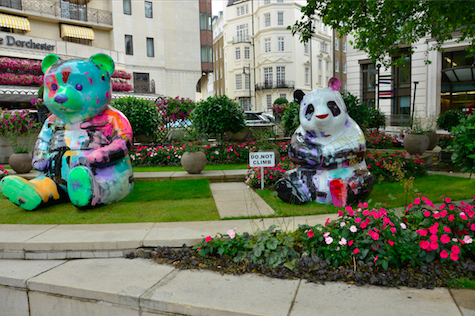
Bâ pandas

In 2009 and 2010, while exploring the relationship between painting and sculpture, he created other models - "Skull" (a human skull), Kwak (a duck) and Popy (a teddy bear). His stay in Asia in 2011 led him to imagine the Bâ family of pandas, which are found in the cities of Singapore and Chengdu.

In July 2021, an exhibition took place in Strasbourg, France.

== Artistic style ==
Julien Marinetti is known for his syncretic approach that treats the bronze object as a three-dimensional painting, expressing a figurative art. Drawn then sculpted in clay each model, he uses bronze as his primary material. The lacquer enhances colors of his sculptures. Doggy John the bulldog, Kwak the duck, Popy the teddy bear, and Bâ the panda feature in several of his works.
