= Aw Tee Hong =

Singaporean artist (1931–2021)

- Aw in 2008
- Born: 29 May 1931; Hainan, China
- Died: 10 October 2021 (aged 90)
- Known for: Oil painting, watercolour, Chinese ink painting, Bronze sculpture

Aw Tee Hong (simplified Chinese: 欧世鸿; traditional Chinese: 歐世鴻; pinyin: Ōu Shìhóng; 29 May 1931 – 10 October 2021) was a Singaporean artist who was known for his oil paintings of the old Singapore River, as well as for numerous public sculptures themed towards Singapore heritage, like the marble relief titled Singapore Poetry found in Tanjong Pagar MRT station. Aw is known for his works in oil and acrylic, watercolour, Chinese ink, charcoal and sculptures.

== Early life ==
Born in Wenshan village at Huiwen, Wenchang county of Hainan island, Aw migrated with his parents to Kelantan, Malaysia at the age of 8 and relocated to Singapore in 1950, where he studied art at the Nanyang Academy of Fine Arts. In 1956 he went on to pursue higher education in art at the China Central Academy of Fine Arts in Beijing, China.

== Accolades ==
Aw was invited back to his alma mater to give a series of thematic lectures on pottery in 1994–1995 and was hence given the title of Visiting Professor by the Central Academy of Fine Arts (otherwise known as Academy of Arts and Design, Tsinghua University), in recognition of his contribution.

Aw collaborated with the Singapore Tourism Promotion Board during the 1980s to create and develop a range of Chinese Opera Masks, amongst other cultural products, which later became iconic souvenirs that helped promote Singapore as a tourist destination. Additionally, Aw was often invited by STPB to participate in trade shows to various countries in Asia, the Middle East and Europe to demonstrate the uniqueness and richness of Singapore Art.

Having had an artistic career spanning six decades, Aw has presented his works through a plethora of platforms, namely art exhibitions, both in Singapore and overseas.

The Fullerton Hotel invited Aw to showcase his 1960s Singapore works.

== Death ==
Aw died on 10 October 2021, at the age of 90.

== Featured works ==
- Pioneering Spirit, Sculpture, 1988, Raffles Place MRT Station
- Struggle for Survival, Sculpture, 1988, Raffles Place MRT Station
- Epic of Singapore, Mural, 1989, Tanjong Pagar MRT Station
- Dancer, Sculpture, 1990, Ministry of Community & Development
- Mother & Child, Sculpture, 1993, KK Women & Children Hospital
- In Safe Hands, Sculpture, 1993, Civil Defence Club
- Series of life size figures representing 4 races of Singapore, Sculpture, 2002, Singapore River outside May Bank Building
