= Joseph McNally (brother) =

Irish brother (1923–2002)

Brother Joseph McNally
- McNally in 1996

Personal life
- Born: 10 August 1923 Ballintubber, County Mayo, Ireland
- Died: 27 August 2002 (aged 79) Ballintubber, County Mayo, Ireland

Religious life
- Religion: Roman Catholicism
- Order: De La Salle Brothers

Brother Joseph McNally (10 August 1923 – 27 August 2002), was an Irish-born Singaporean member of the De La Salle Brothers. He was the founder of St Patrick's Arts Centre, now known as Lasalle College of the Arts, in Singapore.

== Early life and education ==
McNally grew up in Ballintubber, County Mayo. He began studying the arts in high school, and left his hometown at the age of 14 to join the De La Salle Brothers. He completed his novitiate at the De La Salle Retreat in Castletown, and his scholasticate at De La Salle College in Mallow, County Cork. In 1943, after graduating from De La Salle College, McNally taught at the college, where his interest in the arts grew. He took art classes at the Mallow Technical School in the evenings while teaching in the daytime.

After teaching briefly in Malaysia, McNally returned to Ireland in 1951, enrolling in the Irish National College of Art. He graduated in 1954, and had his first solo exhibition that same year, at the Brown Thomas Gallery in Dublin.

In 1968, McNally went to Columbia University, New York and took up its Master in Arts programme, studying first painting and later sculpture. He was awarded his PhD in Art Education from Columbia University in 1972.

== Education career ==
In 1946, De La Salle College sent McNally to Singapore to teach at the St Joseph's Institution. After his Singapore posting, McNally was sent to St John's Institution in Kuala Lumpur, Malaysia, and taught there briefly.

In 1955, McNally returned to Malaysia to teach at St Paul's Institution in Seremban and later at St Xavier's Institution in Penang. He joined the staff of St Joseph's Training College in Penang in 1958. In 1962, he became the vice-principal of St John's Institution in Kuala Lumpur and in 1963, he was appointed as its principal. McNally later taught at St Joseph's Training College.

In 1973, McNally went to Singapore again and taught at St Patrick's School. He became its principal in 1975 and retired in 1982.

In 1984, McNally founded the St Patrick's Arts Centre, serving as its president. He retired in 1997, receiving the honorary title of President Emeritus.

Singapore's Ministry of Education sought his advice regarding changes to the national arts syllabus and McNally helped to establish the Art Elective Programme.

== Personal life ==
In 1965, McNally became a Malaysian citizen to integrate with the local people and culture as he was teaching there. He became a Singaporean citizen in 1985.

On 27 August 2002, McNally died from a heart attack during a visit to his hometown. He was buried in the grounds of Ballintubber Abbey.

== Honours ==
In 1990, McNally was awarded the Pingat Bakti Masyarakat (Public Service Medal) and in 1997, the Pingat Jasa Gemilang (Meritorious Service Medal).

== Legacy ==
In 2006, a new road created outside the Lasalle College of the Arts was named McNally Street in his honour. The Singapore Art Museum held a tribute in 2014, the 12th anniversary of his death.
