= Checha Davies =

Indian-born Singaporean social worker and women's rights activist

- Born: Checha George; 1898; Kerala, India
- Died: 2 September 1979 (aged 80–81); Singapore
- Other name: Mrs. E. V. Davies
- Occupations: educator, social worker, women's rights activist
- Years active: 1916–1979
- Known for: donating her weight in gold to build a women's hostel for the YWCA of Singapore

Checha Davies (often cited as Mrs. E. V. Davies) (1898–1979) was an Indian-born Singaporean social worker and women's rights activist. In her younger days, she was an educator but after her move to Singapore she was active in church work and social service organisations, serving as president of the YWCA on two separate occasions. Davies was instrumental in the committee which drafted the rules for the Singapore Council of Women and served on its executive committee. Davies received the Public Service Star in 1970 and was inducted into the Singapore Women's Hall of Fame in its inaugural year, 2014.

== Early life ==
Checha George was born in 1898 in Kerala, India to T. D. George, a Methodist lay preacher. Receiving her education during the British rule of India, she attended school in Madras, studying economics and English History and earning her bachelor's and master's degrees. George also earned a medal for playing tennis and continued to play even after her marriage and move to Singapore, wearing her sari on the courts. She joined the YWCA Association in 1916, adopting their mission to improve education opportunities for women and girls. She also served as a lay preacher for the Methodist church. George became a school teacher and was employed at the Women's Christian College in Madras. On 3 April 1925 at Madras, she married E. V. Davies (Edward Vethanayagam), of Singapore's Outram Road School, and returned with him to Singapore.

== Community activism ==
When she arrived in Singapore, Davies joined the Tamil Methodist Church and served as both a preacher and a lecturer. She travelled abroad, to various places in Asia, the Americas, Europe, and the Middle East as the president of the Women's Society of Christian Service. Though travelling as an unaccompanied Indian woman was unheard of in the 1930s, she also travelled as an ambassador-at-large for the YWCA. In 1931, Davies founded the Indian-Ceylonese Club, later known as the Lotus Club, which was the first ladies' organisation for women of Indian descent in Singapore. After a dinner with Jawaharlal Nehru, in which he suggested that the Lotus Club merge with another organisation called the Ladies Union, the two clubs became the Kamala Club. The club served as both a social and cultural organisation and was a landmark of charitable works. She also served as president of the International Women's Club, which aimed at uniting women of various nationalities in completing community improvement projects. In her endeavours, Davies was driven by the idea that "doing rather than talking" was a demonstration of faith.

After the Japanese occupation of Singapore, Davies and other women worked to improve the deplorable conditions affecting many women's lives. She met with Shirin Fozdar in 1951 to draft a constitution for a woman's council to address women's issues. When the Singapore Council of Women (SCW) was founded in 1952, Davies, along with Fozdar and Tan Cheng Hiong Lee served in its executive council. Davies was chair of the membership committee and as such, increased membership by 1955 to over 2000 women. Though the aim of the organisation was to increase the political and socio-economic equality of women in Singapore, Davies preferred to work on social projects for women in need; however, she was a staunch supporter of the anti-polygamy campaign of the SCW and pressed for men's support in the cause. When the Women's Charter passed the Singaporean Parliament in 1961, a ban on polygamy was adopted, as well as many legal protections for which Davies and the SCW had pressed. After passage of the Charter, Davies turned her attention to social projects with the YWCA and decreased her participation in the SCW.

In her work with the YWCA of Singapore, Davies pushed for adult women's education and children's programs. She was an advocate for hostels for low-income workers and women with children. From 1960 to 1964, and again from 1966 to 1968, Davies served as president of the Singapore YWCA. In 1967, she was awarded a gold badge from the YWCA for her service. In a 1969 project to build a 6-storey women's hostel on Fort Canning Road, Davies proposed that women donate their weight in dollars. To reach her own donation goal, Davies sold her house The building was completed, allowing the YWCA to generate income for other projects from the rent. For this and other services to the community, on National Day in 1970, Davies was awarded the Bintang Bakti Masyarakat (Public Service Star).

Davies died on 2 September 1979 at the Tan Tock Seng Hospital after a brief illness. She was posthumously inducted in 2014 into the Singapore Women's Hall of Fame in their inaugural group of women.
