= Mary Lobo =

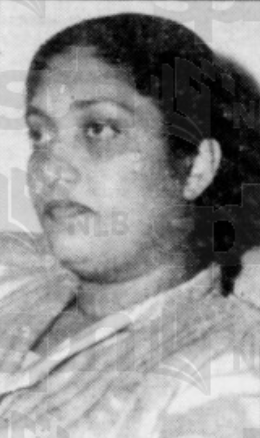
Lobo in 1953

Mary Lobo (born in 1922 or 1923) was a prominent social worker, clubwoman and women's rights activist in Singapore. She served as the president of the Kamala Club, a prominent club for Indian women in Singapore.

== Early life ==
Lobo was born in Mangalore, India. She came to Singapore at the age of six and was educated at the Convent of the Holy Infant Jesus.

== Career ==
In April 1947, Lobo was elected the president of the Women's Section of the Singapore Regional Indian Congress. In 1948, she proposed that the Gandhi Memorial Fund be used to erect a memorial hall instead of a statue. She then resigned from her position in the Women's Section to focus on developing the proposal. She was appointed a Justice of the Peace in April 1950, making her one of the few female justices of the peace in Singapore. She served as the joint secretary of the Lotus Club and the secretary of the Sodality of Our Lady of the Lourdes. She worked with the Girls Home on Mount Mary, the Anti-Tuberculosis Fund and the Ramakrishna Mission Singapore, and served as the joint secretary of the mission's building fund. She served on the committee which organised a concert for the Gandhi Memorial Fund and assisted at both a local orphanage and the Social Welfare Department feeding centre. In 1952, she urged for the formation of a women's corps for civil defence. By 1953, she had served as the president of the New Homes Tenants Association and the vice-president of the Kamala Club, which was formed through the merger of the Lotus Club with the Ladies' Union. She had also served on the management committee of the local YWCA, as well as on the Film Appeals Board.

On 6 October 1953, the Singapore Progressive Party nominated Lobo to contest the City Ward in the 1953 Singapore City Council election. However, as she had moved from Geylang to Bukit Timah, which was located beyond city limits, she lost her right to stand in the city council elections and was thus disqualified. If she had not been disqualified, she would have been the only female candidate in the election. In September 1954, she was elected the president of the International Women's Club of Singapore for 1955. By 1956, she had become the chairman of Women Justices of the Peace and the vice-president of the Singapore Voluntary Workers' Association, as well as a member of the Woodbridge Hospital board and an assistant librarian at the Tan Tock Seng Hospital. In the same year, she was appointed a delegate to the International Alliance of Women's golden jubilee conference, which was held in Colombo. She advocated for the creation of a local Alliance of Women, the purpose of which would be to "urge women to use their rights and influence in public life," and the establishment of a home for unmarried mothers.

Lobo served as the vice-president of the Singapore Council of Women. In 1957, the government appointed her as an official delegate to the Asian Women's conference held in Bangkok. After returning to Singapore, she delivered an eight-page report on how women had more rights in Singapore than in many other Asian countries. However, in August, it was reported that she had claimed at the conference that Singaporean men were "wonderful" as Singaporean women "never have to fight for their rights, they are given to us". Several prominent local women, including politician Phyllis Eu Cheng Li and the council's general secretary Shirin Fozdar, strongly criticised the statement. In response to the statement, Fozdar sent a letter containing a cutting of a report by The Straits Times on the then-69-times-married Tengku Mohammed Ariffin, a Singaporean Malay businessman and distant relative of the Sultan of Perak, to the conference's organiser. On 10 August, she reaffirmed her belief that local men were "wonderful" and stated that when compared to other countries in Europe or Asia, Singaporean women have been able to attain rights easier, but added that there were still areas in which women's rights could be improved. Later that month, it was reported that the issue had been resolved as Lobo had clarified that she had been referring to "political rights", and that the statement had been made at an informal tea party, not at the conference itself.

In 1958, she was the official Singaporean delegate to the United Nations seminar on "Increase Participation of Asian Women in Public Life." She also served as the chairman of the building fund for the Kamala Club clubhouse, which was officially opened on 8 September 1958. In September 1961, she was elected the club's president. As the newly-elected president, she urged the club's members to ensure that they had paid the club's yearly subscription fee, as only 20 of the club's 165 members had paid their subscriptions for that year. In the same year, she also served the chairman of the Grail Movement, which was formed to raise funds for a centre for the training of social workers. In October, she organised a 20-stall bazaar which was patronised by over 2,000 people, the proceeds of which went to the construction of the centre.

== Personal life ==
Lobo married Matthew Lobo of Gammon (Malaya) Ltd at the Church of the Holy Family, Singapore in Katong on 8 June 1939. She gave birth to two twin sons in 1960. Despite being a devout Catholic, she helped collect funds for organisations of other religions in addition to her own church. By 1959, she could speak English, Hindustani, French and a little bit of Malay, and was in the process of learning Mandarin. In April 1963, she left Singapore for Bangalore.
