= Tan Cheng Hiong =

Tan Cheng Hiong Lee
- Born: 1904; Singapore
- Died: 1999 (aged 95); Singapore
- Occupation: Political activist
- Known for: President of Singapore Council of Women
- Term: 1952–1971

Tan Cheng Hiong (1904–1999) was a Singaporean women's rights activist and the first president of the Singapore Council of Women. She was inducted into the Singapore Women's Hall of Fame on 18 March 2016.

== Biography ==
Hiong was born in Singapore in 1904. She married Chinese-born publisher George Lee, brother of philanthropist Lee Kong Chian in 1931, with whom she had nine children. After 15 years of marriage she discovered her husband had taken a concubine, at which point she had contemplated suicide.

Beginning in her forties, Hiong entered into social work, dedicating herself to women's advocacy programs. She later stated she was strongly influenced by her Baháʼí Faith, which promotes equality of all people. In 1952 she met activist Shirin Fozdar, and together they, along with Checha Davies, founded the Singapore Council of Women on 4 April 1952. Throughout the 1950s, Hiong and Fozdar worked to criminalize polygamy, advocate for child care and safer conditions in the workplace, and pressed the government to begin reforms to prostitution law. Hiong also combated what she described as "barbaric and silly" traditions regarding foot binding. The Singapore Council of Women was involved in the passage of the Women's Charter in 1961, which promoted monogamous marriage, the rights of husbands and wives, and reforming divorce laws as to benefit both parents and children.

Hiong was the president of the Singapore Council of Women from 1952 to 1957, and the Vice President from 1958 until 1971, when it was dissolved. She died in Singapore in 1999 at the age of 95.
