= Rural West Constituency =

Former Singaporean constituency

Coordinates: 1.37°N 103.7°E

Rural West
- Former constituency for the Legislative Council of Singapore
- Location of Rural West in Singapore
- Region: Singapore
- Electorate: 2,774

Former constituency
- Created: 1948; 78 years ago
- Abolished: 1951; 75 years ago
- Seats: 1
- Party: Independent
- Members: Srish Chandra Goho (1948); Balwant Singh Bajaj (1948–1951)
- Replaced by: Bukit Timah

Rural West Constituency was a constituency represented in the Legislative Council of Singapore from 1948 until 1951. It elected one Legislative Council member.

== Profile ==
The Rural West constituency covered the seven surrounding islands of SIngapore, the naval base area in Seletar, and the army cantonment in Pasir Panjang. It also covered populated areas as Bukit Timah, Holland Road, Jurong and Sembawang.

It also covered the areas of Bajau, Bukit Batok, Bukit Panjang, Bukit Timah, Choa Chu Kang, Clementi, Jurong, Kranji, Lim Chu Kang, Mandai, Pandan, Pasir Panjang, Peng Kang, Seletar, Sembawang, Tuas, Ulu Kalang, Ulu Pandan, Woodlands, Yishun.

== History ==
The constituency was formed in 1948. In 1951, the constituency was abolished and renamed as Bukit Timah Constituency.

== Legislative Council member ==
Year	Member	Party
1948	Srish Chandra Goho	Independent
1948	Balwant Singh Bajaj	Independent

== Electoral results ==
Note: The Elections Department does not include rejected votes when calculating the vote shares of candidates. Hence, all candidates' vote shares will total to 100% at any given election (may not appear so in multi-way contests due to rounding).

=== Elections in 1940s ===
General Election 1948: Rural West
Party	Candidate	Votes	%	±%
Independent	Srish Chandra Goho	981	50.0	
Independent	Malathi Pillai	520	26.5	
PP	Arumugam Ponnu Rajah	460	23.5	
Majority		461	23.5	
Turnout		2,036	73.4	
Registered electors		2,774		
Independent win				

By-election 1948
Party	Candidate	Votes	%	±%
Independent	Balwant Singh Bajaj	1,638	55.5	
PP	Cheong Hock Chye	705	23.9	▲0.4
Independent	Maganlal Gangaram	606	20.5	
Majority		933	31.6	
Turnout		3,121	72.9	▼0.5
Registered electors		4,279		
Independent win				
