= Bashir Ahmad Mallal =

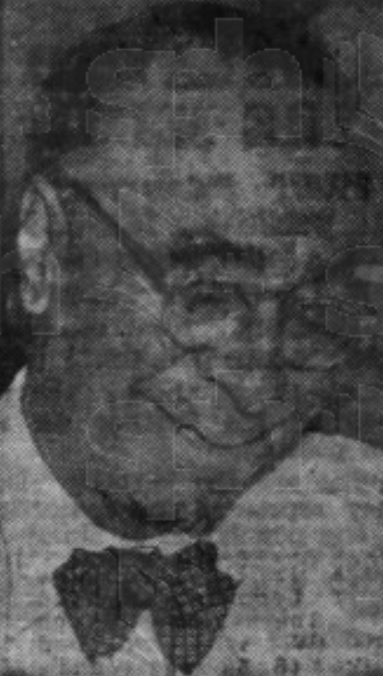
Mallal in 1948.

Bashir Ahmad Mallal (26 February 1898 – 5 September 1972) was a legal scholar, writer and journalist who founded, edited and published the Malayan Law Journal. He authored several legal texts, including Mallal's Digest of Malaysian and Singapore Case Law, and was a founding member and secretary of the Singapore Indian Association and the Anjuman-I-Islam. He also edited both The Indian and The Muslim, which were the official organs of the Singapore Indian Association and the Anjuman-I-Islam respectively.

== Early life and education ==
Mallal was born Ishar Das on 26 February 1898 in the town of Domel in Pakistan, then a part of British India. He then travelled East, and arrived in Singapore during World War I. He was not formally educated in law, nor did he attend university.

== Career ==
In 1918, Mallal was hired as a clerk at the law firm Battenburg & Silva. He was an early member of the Anjuman-I-Islam, a local organisation advocating for Islamic reform which was established in 1921, being one of its "backbones". He was elected the organisation's honorary secretary at its first general meeting, held in August of that year. In the same month, he was elected a member of the committee of the local Muslim Association at a combined meeting between the association and the Muslim Institute. Mallal was appointed the publisher of The Muslim, a magazine which served as the official organ of the Anjuman-I-Islam, on its founding, with the first issue appearing in January 1922. From then on, Mallal and Syed Qudrat Shah alternated as the magazine's editor. The organisation's membership soon rose to above 500 with the support of several "prominent and well-known" figures within the local Islamic community. The Malaya Tribune's Muslim correspondent later credited this to Mallal's efforts. In June, he was elected a member of the general committee of the Clerical Union.

According to historian Hafiz Zakariya, Mallal was one of the "key movers" for the founding of the Singapore Indian Association on 30 March 1923. Zakariya further stated that Mallal had initiated the association's founding, having done so "with the hope that it would be able to dominate and control the direction of the government through elected Indians in the Legislative Association, as there were members who held anti-British sentiments." In January 1925, he was elected a member of the association's board of directors. In April, he was elected the association's founding honorary secretary. In the same year, he resigned as editor of The Muslim on account of ill health. The Malaya Tribune's Muslim correspondent opined in 1928 that the magazine's publication became "very unsatisfactory" following Mallal's resignation. Mallal was elected the honorary general secretary of the Moslem Association at a general meeting held in January of the following year. By September 1926, he had become a managing clerk with the law firm John G. Campbell and Company. By February of the following year, he had become the editor of The Muslim.

In 1926, the Anjuman-I-Islam was "attacked" by "more conservative elements" of the local Islamic community. In response, the organisation decided to file a lawsuit for libel, which they won. Mallal then wrote a book on the case, titled The Trial of Muslim Libel Case, which was published and printed by the C. A. Ribeiro Company in 1928. He claimed in the forward of the book to have written it due to the "lack of coverage of civil as opposed to the more sensational criminal law cases." In October 1928, Mallal was appointed the honorary general secretary of the Anjuman-I-Islam. He was also appointed the editor of The Muslim, which ceased publication in December 1927. Mallal claimed that he would publish issues twice every month "as soon as circumstances permit." He succeeded Syed Qudrat Shah in both positions. In March 1929, he was elected a member of the Finance Committee of the Singapore Indian Association. In the following month, he succeeded R. B. Krishnan as the editor of The Indian, then the official magazine of the Singapore Indian Association. He and Rajabali Jumabhoy were sent as delegates representing the Singapore Indian Association to the Standing Committee of the All-Malaya Indian Conference in August.

In February 1931, the first edition of Mallal's The Criminal Procedure Code of the Straits Settlements Annotated was printed and published by the C. A. Ribeiro Company. A compilation of law reports, it was the first of its kind to be published in the colony. Each copy cost $35. According to Brendan Luyt, this suggested a "healthy profit margin". Luyt argued that this meant that the importance of the work for the C. A. Ribeiro Company "probably cannot be overstated" as 1931 was "otherwise not a good year" for the company. In a review of the second edition of the work, which was published in 1935, a critic from The Straits Times wrote that it "rapidly became a valuable reference book." In 1932, Mallal founded and became the editor of the Malayan Law Journal. He had done so due to the "inadequacies of law reporting" in Malaya, brought about by the folding of the Straits Law Journal and Reporter half a century earlier. The first issue was published in July. According to Kevin Tan Yew Lee, the journal is "probably his most lasting and prominent legacy." In December 1933, he was one of several who were elected a vice-president of the Clerical Union. In July 1935, he was elected the chairman of the union's Literary Committee and a member of its Public Affairs section. Mallal then co-authored Money-Lenders' Ordinance with his brother Nasir A. Mallal, who was also a legal writer. The book was published in 1936.

In 1937, Mallal's second "monumental" work, titled Straits Settlements Practice, was published. This was again co-authored with his brother. In July 1939, Malayan Cases, a collection of local legal cases which he co-edited with Nasir, was published by him through the Malayan Law Journal. Mallal and Nasir then authored the first edition of Mallal's Digest of Malayan Case Law. Published in October 1940 through the Malayan Law Journal Office, it had been compiled to address the general demand for a "digest" of cases which were reported in the Malayan Law Journal. According to Kevin Tan Yew Lee, for the first and second editions of the work, it was "very much a one-man show", with Mallal "patiently labouring over every aspect of its publication". The initial edition was only a single volume less than 300 pages long. This was considered his third "outstanding" work. On its release, critic D. G. Osborne-Jones of The Straits Times called it "most useful to legal practitioners" and opined that the Mallals had "performed a most useful public service by this work." The following year, his Straits Settlements Law Reports was published.

Mallal was elected a councillor of the Malayan Branch of the Royal Asiatic Society in March 1946. In August 1947, he published a book covering the war crimes trials against those involved in the 1943 Double Tenth incident, which occurred as part of the Japanese Occupation of Singapore. A critic from The Singapore Free Press wrote that while the work would "undoubtedly have a large sale", it is "in many ways a disappointing book", criticising the "many misprints" and the omission of Appendices which were presented as evidence in the trials. In December, he was elected a member of the committee of the newly-formed Muslim League of Malaya. He was also elected to the committee which was to form the league's constitution. In July 1948, Mallal published the third edition of The Criminal Procedure Code of the Straits Settlements Annotated, now titled Mallal's Criminal Procedure. A third edition had been completed in 1941, though plans for its publication were halted by the war and the Japanese Occupation.

In April 1949, Mallal was elected the general secretary of the Singapore Muslim League. In the same year, he and lawyers Reynold Lionel Eber and Ahmad Mohamed Ibrahim were tasked with revising and updating the Singapore Law Reports for 1941 and 1946 to 1949. Mallal was appointed to a newly-formed committee of the league which was to appeal for the "return" of Maria Hertogh, also known as "Nadra", in December of the following year. He was also appointed a member of the Muslim Advisory Board by the government. A fourth edition of Mallal's Criminal Procedure was published by Mallal through the Malayan Law Journal Office in August 1957. In 1962, the University of Singapore awarded him an honorary Doctor of Law degree. He eventually began work on a third edition of Mallal's Digest, which was to comprise five volumes. He was assisted by Ahmad Mohamed Ibrahim and Al-Mansor Adabi. However, Mallal had only completed three volumes as he died whilst working on the fourth volume, which was later completed by Ibrahim and Adabi, with the fifth volume never coming to fruition.

According to Kevin Tan Yew Lee, Mallal "possessed an encyclopedic knowledge of the law." Despite being self-taught, lawyers would consult him. As such, he garnered a reputation as a "lawyer's lawyer". He also encouraged and gave guidance to young lawyers who were "trying to get a head start", including Prime Minister Lee Kuan Yew and A. Wilson, the chairman of the Combined Bar Committee of Kelantan and Terengganu. He also mentored Ong Hock Thye, a Chief Justice of Malaya.

== Personal life and death ==
Mallal was the brother of lawyer and fellow legal writer Nasir Ahmad Mallal. He converted to the Islamic faith before coming to Malaya, after which he became Bashir Ahmad Mallal. In December 1923, he was forced to return to India as he had been accused of perpetrating a kidnapping while he was in the country. However, he was found innocent and returned to Singapore thereafter. Mallal filed for bankruptcy in September 1951 as he was $34,000 in debt. He was discharged from bankruptcy in April 1953, having paid $20,000 of what he owed by then. He married Zainab Mallal, with whom he had six sons and four daughters.

Mallal died of his fifth heart attack at his house on Tomlinson Road on 5 September 1972. He was buried at the Muslim Cemetery within Bidadari Cemetery. Lee Kuan Yew then sent a letter of condolence to Mallal's family, recalling that he would visit the house in his youth as a classmate of Mallal's son Rashid. Lee, who became a lawyer, later "got to know [Mallal] as a helpful and kindly man, who gave a lot of his time to help and encourage young lawyers like [him] get started in their careers." After his death, Al-Mansor Adabi became the editor of the Malayan Law Journal, which then "went through a rather difficult period."
