= Maganlal Gangaram =

Singaporean businessman (1905–1953)

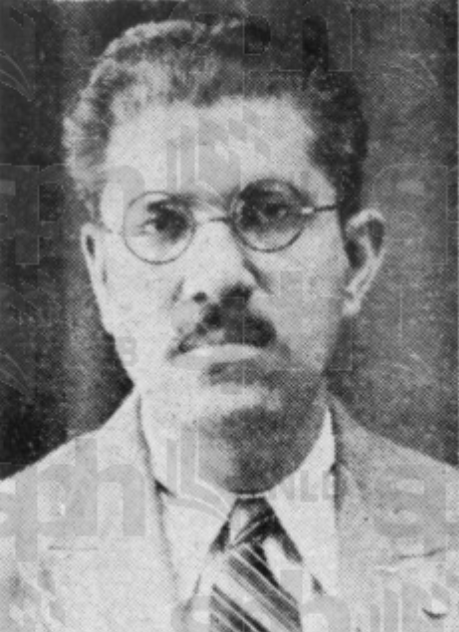
Maganlal in 1940

Maganlal Gangaram (1905 – 1 January 1953) was the president of the Singapore Indian Chamber of Commerce from 1937 to 1940 and the director of Maganlal Nagindas & Co.

== Early life ==
Maganlal came to Singapore in 1913 and received his education at the St. Anthony Boys' School and later at the Anglo-Chinese School.

== Career ==
Maganlal was a partner and the managing director of Maganlal Nagindas & Co. He was elected the vice-president of the Singapore Indian Chamber of Commerce in March 1937. During an extraordinary meeting on 15 October, he was elected the president of the chamber of commerce, replacing Jumabhoy Mohamed Jumabhoy. He resigned from the position in April 1940 and was replaced by Rajabali Jumabhoy. In May of the following year, Maganlal was elected the chamber's Deputy Chairman. Following the start of the Pacific War, he was appointed the chairman of the Passive Defence Committee, which later became the Indian Passive Defence Corps. During the Japanese occupation of Singapore, he served as the chairman of the Indian Chamber of Commerce. He also served as the member-in-change of the Finance Section of the local branch of the Indian Independence League and a member of the Azad Hind Board of Finance.

Following the end of the Japanese occupation, Maganlal was one of a group of seven Indians who were detained for questioning by the British Military Administration at Outram Prison on 20 October 1945. He was released on 9 January 1946, before being charged with alleged extortion at the Supreme Court. After further investigation, all of the charges against Maganlal and the rest of the group were withdrawn in February, and he went on a six-month trip to India in April. However, for domestic reasons, he remained in India for much longer and only returned to Singapore on 23 April of the following year. Upon arriving in Singapore, he was told by an Immigration Officer to leave within the next 30 days as his presence was considered "undesirable", and was forced to pay a $2,000 fine. He wrote a letter to then-Colonial Secretary of Singapore Sir Patrick McKerron, asking him to reconsider the order. Maganlal received the support of S. K. Chettur, the Indian government's representative to Malaya, who reported the issue to the Indian government. After McKerron wrote back to Maganlal, stating that he was unable to remove the Immigration Officer's order. The issue was resolved in June, with the Malayan Indian Congress condemning the Singaporean government's actions against Maganlal.

In March 1948, Maganlal was appointed the honorary treasurer of the Gandhi Memorial Fund. He stood as an Independent candidate for Rural Ward in 1948 Rural West by-election, which was held in October following the death of incumbent Shrish Chandra Goho. He came in third with 20.55% of the votes, behind Balwant Singh and Cheong Hock Chye. He was also a patron of the Singapore Indian Association, and the honorary auditor of the A.C.S. Old Boys' Association.

== Personal life and death ==
Maganlal was married with 11 sons, nine of whom were born and raised in Singapore. He died of a heart attack in Surat, India on 1 January 1953.
