= Jesudoss Muthaiya Dorai Raj =

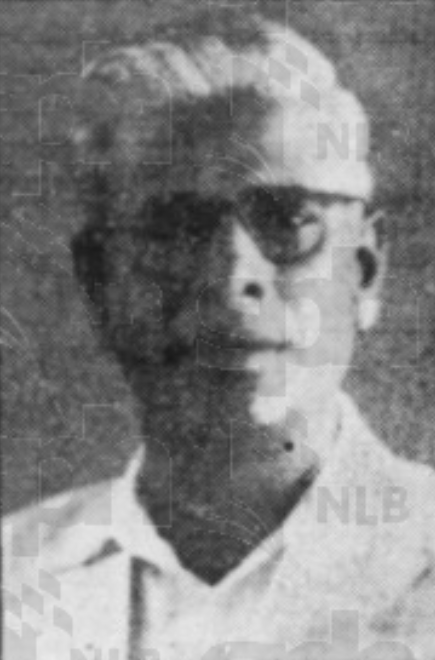
Dorai Raj in 1946

Jesudoss Muthaiya Dorai Raj (1889 – 4 May 1956) was the secretary of the Singapore Indian Chamber of Commerce from 1946 to 1954 and the personal assistant to the Director of Education of Singapere

== Career ==
Dorai Raj came to British Malaya in 1911 and became a schoolmaster at the Anglo-Chinese School in Penang. He then began working as the chief stenographer to colonial administrator William Peel. He later joined the colonial secretariat and became the personal assistant to the Director of Education of the Straits Settlements, working for many years under Richard Olaf Winstedt. He served as the confidential secretary to the Ormsby-Gore Colonial Office Mission when it toured Malaya in 1928. He retired from his position as the personal assistant to the Director of Education in 1940.

During the Japanese Occupation of Singapore, Dorai Raj served as the personal assistant to Captain Andrew Tokuji Ogawa, who had been appointed the Director of Education. After hearing of the looting by the Japanese occurring at Raffles College, which left several valuable books lying about, he went to Ogawa to obtain permission to store them elsewhere. After successfully obtaining permission from Ogawa, Dorai Raj spent four days transferring the books to the Fullerton Building, which had been converted into the new headquarters for the Education Department by the Japanese. He saved over 60 per cent of the college's collection. He was also successful in persuading Ogawa to allow him to hire a librarian, who helped Dorai Raj in cataloguing the recovered books. He resigned in February 1944 and left for Sungai Petani in Kedah, where he remained for the rest of the occupation. On 26 August 1945, following the end of the occupation and as he was about to return to Singapore, he received word that the books had been transferred to Taiping, Perak, where they were to be distributed to teachers and others there by Japanese officers. Dorai Raj then left for Taiping with an interpreter and was successful in persuading the officers not to distribute the books, and to instead relocate them to the local convent until they were claimed by either Raffles College or the Education Department.

In 1946, Dorai Raj was appointed the secretary of the Singapore Indian Chamber of Commerce. As an advisor to the Malayan Employers' Delegate, he attended the Asian Conference of the International Labour Organization, held in Delhi, India in 1947. He was appointed the secretary of the Gandhi Memorial Fund Committee in March 1948. He was a founding member of the Singapore Indian Association, of which he served twice as the general secretary. He also served as its treasurer, the chairman of its sports committee, the secretary of its Financial Committee, its librarian, and the secretary of its Building Fund. He served as the auditor of the Singapore Teachers' Association.

== Personal life and death ==
Dorai Raj married Lily Abraham. He had three daughters and four sons, one of whom died in infancy. He died at the Singapore General Hospital on 4 May 1956 following a brief illness.
