= A. P. Rajah =

Singaporean judge and politician (1911–1999)

- ஏ.பி. ராஜா
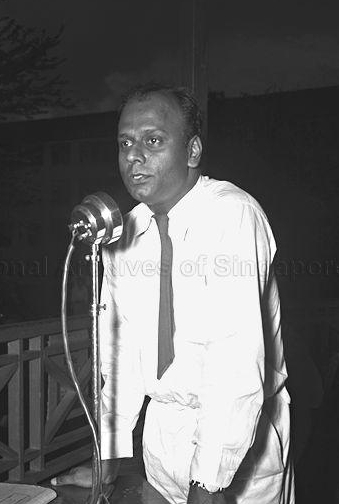
- Rajah in 1951

Judge of the Supreme Court of Singapore
- In office 1 October 1976 – 30 September 1990

High Commissioner to Australia
- In office August 1971 – June 1973

High Commissioner to the United Kingdom
- In office August 1966 – June 1971

1st Speaker of the Parliament of Singapore
- In office 2 November 1964 – 5 August 1966
- Deputy: Fong Kim Heng; Punch Coomaraswamy
- Preceded by: E. W. Barker
- Succeeded by: Punch Coomaraswamy

Member of the Legislative Assembly for Farrer Park Constituency
- In office 30 May 1959 – 3 September 1963
- Preceded by: A. R. Lazarous (LF)
- Succeeded by: S. R. Dharmarajoo (PAP)
- Majority: 1959: 4,077 (44.52%)

Personal details
- Born: Arumugam Ponnurajah; 7 July 1911 Port Dickson, Negeri Sembilan, Federated Malay States, British Malaya
- Died: 28 September 1999 (aged 88) Singapore
- Party: Independent (1956–1999)
- Other political affiliations: Progressive Party (until 1956)
- Spouse: Vijaya Lakshmi (died 1971)
- Children: 2
- Education: University of Oxford
- Occupation: Judge; Diplomat; Politician

Arumugam Ponnurajah, (Note: Tamil: ஆறுமுகம் பொன்னுராஜா, romanized: Āṟumukam Poṉṉurājā) (7 July 1911 – 28 September 1999) commonly known as A. P. Rajah, was a Singaporean judge, diplomat and politician. He served as Speaker of the Parliament of Singapore between 1964 and 1966 becoming the first speaker after independence, as Singapore High Commissioner to the United Kingdom and later Singapore High Commissioner to Australia, and thereafter on the Supreme Court. He was Singapore's first Supreme Court judge to remain on the bench after turning 70.

== Education ==
Rajah received his early education at St. Paul's Institution and Raffles Institution. In 1932, he attended University of Oxford where he received a law degree. He was later conferred the Honorary Degree of Doctor of Laws by the National University of Singapore on 14 November 1984.

== Career ==
In 1948, Rajah contested in the Legislative Council of Singapore for Rural West Constituency as a Progressive Party candidate but lost to independent candidate Srish Chandra Goho (S. C. Goho). In 1949, Rajah was elected a city councillor. In 1953, Rajah represented Singapore to attend the Coronation of Queen Elizabeth II. In 1959, Rajah re-entered politics as an independent candidate and was elected to the Legislative Assembly for Farrer Park. He lost his seat in 1963, but was appointed the Speaker of the Legislative Assembly of Singapore in 1964. In 1965, after Singapore gained independence, the Legislative Assembly of Singapore was renamed the Parliament of Singapore and he became the first Speaker of the Parliament.

In 1966, Rajah was appointed as the High Commissioner to UK. Between 1971 and 1973, he was appointed as the High Commissioner to Australia and Fiji.

Rajah returned to Singapore in 1973 to resume legal practice, and was later appointed as a Supreme Court judge on 1 October 1976. He held the appointment till he retired on 30 September 1990 at the age of 79.

Rajah was the Pro-Chancellor of NUS from 1990 to 1999 and was also chairman of the Hindu Advisory Board in that time.

== Family and death ==
Rajah died on 28 September 1999. His wife, Vijaya Lakshmi pre-deceased him in 1971. He was survived by his son Chelva Rajah, a senior counsel, and daughter Mala.

== Notes ==
Legal offices
Preceded by D. C. D'Cotta	Supreme Court Judge of Singapore; 1976 – 1990	Succeeded by T. S. Sinnathuray
Parliament of Singapore
Preceded by Edmund W. Barker	Speaker of the Parliament of Singapore; 1964 – 1966	Succeeded by Punch Coomaraswamy
Preceded by Anthony Rebeiro Lazarous	Member of the Singapore Parliament for Farrer Park Constituency; 1959 – 1963	Succeeded by S.R. Dharmarajoo
