= G. Ramachandran (disambiguation) =

G. Ramachandran (born 1931) is a former president of the Singapore Indian Chamber of Commerce and Industry (SICCI).

G. Ramachandran may also refer to:

- G. Ramachandran (producer) (1954-2021), an Indian film producer
- G. Ramachandran (social reformer) (1904–1995), a soldier for the Gandhian cause, social reformer and teacher
- G. N. Ramachandran (1922–2001), Indian physicist

== See also ==
- M. G. Ramachandran
