= R. B. Krishnan =

Singaporean journalist and writer (died 1940)

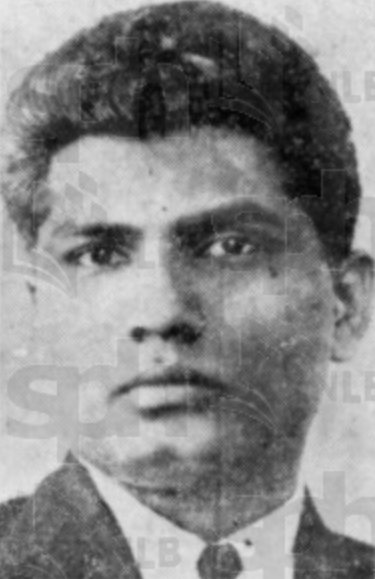
Krishnan in 1932.

R. B. Krishnan (died 1 November 1940) was a prominent journalist and writer in Singapore. A prominent member of the local Indian community, he was the editor of The Indian, a publication of the Singapore Indian Association of which he was general secretary, and the author of Indians in Malaya: a Pageant of Greater India.

== Early life and education ==
Krishnan was born in Bukit Mertajam in Penang. He was the son of Boopathy Rajagopal, a pioneering civil servant of the Public Works Department.

== Career ==
In March 1923, Krishnan became a member of the committee which was to oversee the formation of a local association catering to both Indians and Ceylonese. He then authored a "pen-portrait" on W. Arthur Wilson, the former editor of The Malaya Tribune, for the first issue of the Malayan Chronicle magazine, published in July. In February of the following year, he was elected a member of the Board of Directors for the newly established Singapore Indian Association. In this period, he was hired at Hoe Boon Leong & Co., a newly-established local sanitary engineering firm. He remained with the company until his death in 1940, eventually rising to the position of general manager.

In January 1925, Krishnan began acting as the Singapore Indian Association's honorary general secretary in place of Edward Vethanayagam Davies. In June, he was elected one of three honorary general secretaries of the Singai Municipal Indian Nesa Sabah at its first general meeting. By August, he and C. R. Menon had been appointed co-editors of The Indian, a newly founded magazine which was published monthly by the Singapore Indian Association. As editor, he frequently wrote on the topic of "local Indian labour", which he had an "intimate knowledge" of. In February 1927, The Singapore Free Press and Mercantile Advertiser reported that both Krishnan and Menon resigned as the co-editors of the magazine and their positions were taken over by S. D. Luther. Krishnan was elected a member of the Straits Settlements (Singapore) Association on 14 May 1928. By December, Krishnan had returned to being the editor of The Indian. However, he was succeeded in this position by Bashir A. Mallal in April of the following year.

Krishnan was a delegate to the first meeting of the Standing Committee of the Indian Conference of Malaya, which was held at the premises of the Selangor Indian Association in Kuala Lumpur in March 1929. He was again a delegate to the committee's second meeting at the Seremban Indian Association in Seremban, along with Mallal and Rajabali Jumabhoy. It was then "unanimously" decided that Singapore would be the venue of the committee's third meeting on 25 December. A sub-committee which was to consider the establishment of an Indian Malayan English-language daily newspaper, comprising Krishnan, Mallal and S. M. Hussain of Penang, was also formed at the second meeting. Krishnan was involved in the organisation of the third meeting in Singapore, which was reportedly an "outstanding success." At the second general meeting of the Sinagpore branch of the Ramakrishna Mission, held in October 1930, Krishnan was elected a member of both its general committee and its building committee.

In June 1931, it was decided that The Indian, which had ceased publication the previous year, would be revived that month with Krishnan serving as the head of its editorial committee as editor in chief. It had been revived as it was decided that there was a need for an "Indian organ" in Malaya. The magazine was reportedly "run successfully" until December, when the manager, L. Natarajan, as well as two members of the editorial committee resigned. After this, it was decided that Krishnan and K. Raghunathan would become joint proprietors of the periodical, though it would continue to be run "under the auspices" of the Singapore Indian Association. In August 1935, Krishnan was elected the general secretary of the Singapore Indian Association at its general meeting.

In October 1936, Krishnan announced that he had written a book which would be published in early November by Malayan Publishers. The book, titled Indians in Malaya: a Pageant of Greater India, was fully-illustrated and intended to be an "authoritative and comprehensive" attempt to "trace the association of Indians with these parts from the earliest recorded time to the present day." It was reportedly the first such "serious" work on the topic. According to The Malaya Tribune in 1940, the book was "well received" by local critics at the time. By May of the following year, he had been appointed a member of the 55-man reception committee which was to receive Jawaharlal Nehru, the Prime Minister of India, on his visit to Singapore in that month. In July 1940, Krishnan was made a Justice of the Peace. The Straits Times then reported that he was "well known locally as an advocate of the local-born Indian cause."

In his later years, Krishnan occasionally wrote letters to the editor of The Straits Times. G. L. Pett opined that his letters were "always balanced, moderate, constructive and admirably written." According to Pett, Krishnan held the view that foreign journalists, "no matter who conscientious or sympathetic he may be, can never be anything more than an interpreter for the local-born population and that the needs and rights of the local-born will never be properly voiced until able journalists born and bred come forward". Krishnan was also secretary of the Hindu Devasthana Panchayat, the committee which managed the Hindu temples on the island.

== Personal life and death ==
Krishnan was married with six children. He died on 1 November 1940 after a long illness, after which he was cremated at the Bidadari Cemetery.
