= Chan Heng Chee =

Singaporean academic (born 1942)

Dr. Chan Heng Chee DUBC PJG PPA(E)
- 陈庆珠
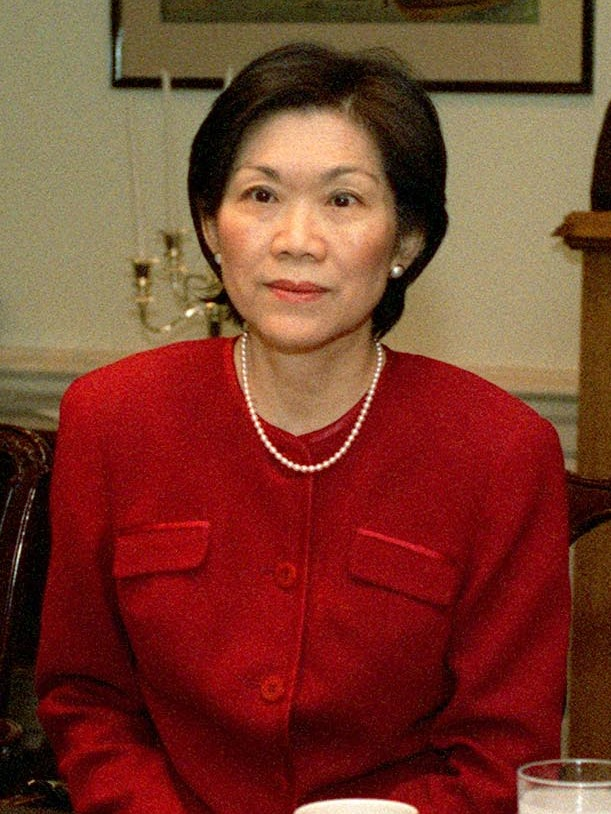
- Chan in 2002

Ambassador-at-Large, Ministry of Foreign Affairs
- Incumbent
- Assumed office July 2012 Serving with Tommy Koh, Gopinath Pillai, Ong Keng Yong, Bilahari Kausikan
- President: Tony Tan; Halimah Yacob; Tharman Shanmugaratnam
- Prime Minister: Lee Hsien Loong; Lawrence Wong

Singapore Ambassador to the United States
- In office 8 July 1996 – 29 July 2012
- President: Ong Teng Cheong; J. Y. Pillay (acting); S. R. Nathan; Tony Tan
- Prime Minister: Goh Chok Tong; Lee Hsien Loong
- Preceded by: S. R. Nathan
- Succeeded by: Ashok Mirpuri

Personal details
- Born: 19 April 1942 (age 84) Singapore
- Spouse: Tay Kheng Soon
- Education: University of Singapore (BA, PhD); Cornell University (MA)
- Occupation: Academic; diplomat

Chan Heng Chee
- Traditional Chinese: 陳慶珠
- Simplified Chinese: 陈庆珠
Transcriptions
Standard Mandarin
- Hanyu Pinyin: Chén Qìngzhū

Chan Heng Chee DUBC PJG PPA(E) (Chinese: 陈庆珠; born 19 April 1942) is a Singaporean academic and diplomat who has been serving as Ambassador-at-Large at the Ministry of Foreign Affairs since 2012, Chairwoman of the National Arts Council and Member of the Presidential Council for Minority Rights. She had also served as Singapore Ambassador to the United States between 1996 and 2012.

== Academic career ==
Chan studied CHIJ Katong Convent before entering the University of Malaya in 1961 (changed to University of Singapore in 1962) where she became the first woman to graduate with a first-class honours in Political Science. Chan graduated with a first-class honours degree in political science from the University of Singapore (now the National University of Singapore) in 1964, and went on to complete a Master of Arts degree at Cornell University in 1967. She subsequently received a PhD from the University of Singapore in 1974. Her thesis was titled: The Dynamics of One-party Dominance: A Study of Five Singapore Constituencies.

Chan was previously the executive director of the Singapore International Foundation and served as Director of the Institute of Southeast Asian Studies. She was also the founding Director of the Institute of Policy Studies.

Chan was a member of the International Advisory Board of the New York-based Council on Foreign Relations, a council member of the International Institute for Strategic Studies (IISS) in London, and a council member of the International Council of the Asia Society in New York. When Ambassador Chan left Washington at the end of her appointment as Ambassador to the US, she received the Inaugural Asia Society Outstanding Diplomatic Achievement Award, the Inaugural Foreign Policy Outstanding Diplomatic Achievement Award 2012 and the United States Navy Distinguished Public Service Award.

Chan has received a number of awards, including honorary Doctor of Letters degrees from the University of Newcastle in 1994 and the University of Buckingham in 1998. She is also a political science professor on secondment at the National University of Singapore. She was also twice awarded the National Book Awards in 1986 for “A Sensation of Independence: A Political Biography of David Marshall” and in 1978 for “The Dynamics of One Party Dominance: The PAP at the Grassroots”.

She is the current chairman of the ISEAS – Yusof Ishak Institute and the former chair of the Lee Kuan Yew Centre for Innovative Cities at the Singapore University of Technology and Design.

== Diplomatic career ==
Chan served as Singapore's Permanent Representative to the United Nations from 1989 to 1991. During this time, she was concurrently accredited as the High Commissioner to Canada and Ambassador to Mexico. She became the Ambassador to the United States in 1996. At the time, she was the first woman ambassador from an East Asian country to be assigned to the United States. Chan expressed surprise at her appointment, noting "I'm anti-establishment and was a bit of a dissident before I was appointed ambassador. It came as something of a shock to me when I was offered the ambassadorship because I was highly critical of government in a society that is not used to being critiqued."

In 1998, Chan received the Inaugural International Woman of the Year Award from the Organization of Chinese American Women (OCAW), and Singapore's first "Woman of the Year" award in 1991. Chan received Singapore's Public Administration Medal (Gold) in 1999, Meritorious Service Medal in 2005 and the Distinguished Service Order, the highest National Day Award, in August 2011.

Chan left her post as Singapore's Ambassador to the US on 23 July 2012, and was replaced by Ashok Kumar Mirpuri. During her tenure, bilateral relations between Singapore and the US improved tremendously. In May 2003, Singapore and US signed the US-Singapore Free Trade Agreement (USSFTA), the first FTA that the US entered into with a Southeast Asian country. Both countries also enhanced their ties in areas of defence and security.

During October 2012, in relation to a discussion on the choice Asian nations may have in terms of supporting China or the US, Chan was quoted as saying, "The United States should not ask Asian countries to choose. You may not like the results if you ask countries to choose."

Chan was appointed to the Presidential Council for Minority Rights in 2012 and was re-appointed in 2015.

She was also appointed as the chairman of the National Arts Council in 2013.

From November 2012 to October 2015, the Singaporean government appointed her for a three-year term service as Singapore's Representative to the ASEAN Intergovernmental Commission on Human Rights (AICHR), succeeding Singapore's first AICHR Representative, Mr Richard R. Magnus.

== Controversies ==
In October 2015, Chan's call to retain the Chinese-Malay-Indian-Others framework as it "sets minority communities here at ease" sparked a debate, with a Malay Singaporean finding her "very wrong. She is from [the] majority and she is elite. She doesn't represent us". An online poll on Dialectic.sg found a majority of 52.8% of the respondents in favour of abandoning such racial categorisation.

In November 2015, Chan spoke at the Singapore International Film Festival (SGIFF) to defend the National Arts Council (NAC)'s censorship policies, prompting calls to boycott the NAC. Chan, NAC's chairman, did not warn the organisers, the strictly no-censorship SGIFF, of her talk's contents. Notably, NAC does not even oversee or supervise Singapore's film industry.

In February 2016, Chan, who is on the Yale-NUS College governing board, delivered a speech defending Singapore's decision to uphold Section 377A at the 24th session of the United Nations Human Rights Council's Universal Periodic Review in Geneva, Switzerland. Her speech prompted students' calls for Chan's removal from the school's governing board, while others said a removal would be unfair because Chan was speaking as a Singaporean ambassador, not as a governor of the college. The school rejected calls to remove her.

== Personal life ==
Chan's father was a businessman. She has two brothers and a sister. Her brother Alan Chan was a top civil servant and a former CEO of Singapore Press Holdings while the other brother Chan Heng Wing is also a diplomat and currently serves as Singapore's Ambassador to the Republic of Austria. She was formerly married to architect Tay Kheng Soon.
