= Murder of Chong Kin Meng =

1983 murder of an elderly woman in Singapore

Chong Kin Meng
- Chong Kin Meng, the 66-year-old murder victim
- Born: Chong Kin Meng; 1917; Singapore
- Died: 31 October 1983 (aged 66); Clementi, Singapore
- Cause of death: Murdered by strangulation
- Other names: Chang Xin Meng
- Known for: Murder victim
- Children: Woo Swee Cheong (foster son)

On 31 October 1983, a 66-year-old woman named Chong Kin Meng (钟剑明 Zhōng Jiànmíng) was found murdered inside her Clementi flat by her foster son's wife. The police investigated and they managed to arrest a suspect for her murder a month later. The 23-year-old suspect, Teo Boon Ann (张文安 Zhāng Wénān), was found to have entered the flat under the pretense of providing Chong's foster son a wedding invitation card and a gift in his father's name, before he proceeded to kill her during a robbery attempt.

Although Teo claimed during his murder trial that he killed Chong in self-defense since she attacked him with a knife, the forensic evidence and Teo's girlfriend's testimony of him trying to rope her in to commit the robbery and murder of Chong was overwhelmingly against Teo's own claims, and it resulted in the trial court finding him guilty of having brutally attacked and killed the victim with the clear intent to cause her death, resulting in Teo being convicted of murder and given the death penalty in 1987, and he was eventually hanged on 20 April 1990.

== Murder and arrest ==
On the evening of 31 October 1983, 25-year-old Ong Chin Choo (王珍珠 Wáng Zhēnzhū), a factory worker, returned home from work when she discovered the dead body of her 66-year-old foster mother-in-law Chong Kin Meng inside the living room, with extensive injuries and bruises on her neck, head and arms. According to Ong and her 35-year-old husband Woo Swee Cheong (胡瑞祥 Hú Ruìxiáng), Chong's foster son who worked as an odd-job labourer, Chong was last seen alive at home at 8.30 am when the couple went out for work. Chong and the couple had lived together for five years as of the time she was killed, and she was known to lead a quiet life and kept to herself, and did not have enemies.

The police classified the case as murder. A search in the flat led to the discovery of a wedding invitation card, in which it wrote the address of Chong's flat, but it was addressed to someone else. There were also no signs of forced entry into the flat and no signs of any valuables missing. The person addressed in the card was a 51-year-old hawker named Teo Liang Heng (张连兴 Zháng Liánxīng or 张良兴 Zháng Liángxīng), who later denied during police questioning that he was involved in the murder. While the police was in the course of investigating Chong's murder, Teo Liang Heng sought the help of his 23-year-old son, Teo Boon Ann, a part-time temple medium, to find the identity of the killer using rituals, so as to clear his name. In front of his father, and Chong's foster son and daughter-in-law, Teo went into a trance, speaking and acting like Chong, who told Woo that she was wronged and asked her son to seek revenge. The killer was described as someone with a tiger tattoo on his hand and wore a gold watch. In his trance, Teo even drew a layout of the living room where Chong was killed, and told Woo that a phone call would come in seven days to reveal the identity of the killer.

However, Teo's actions drew suspicion from the police over how he was able to exactly describe the way how Chong died and drew the exact same layout of the flat. Teo was later arrested for another unrelated offence, and he subsequently was questioned for the murder inquiry of Chong's case. Later, Teo confessed his involvement in the crime, and he was charged with murder on 11 November 1983. Teo's handwriting and fingerprints were matched to the ones found on the wedding card invitation, further linking him to the crime. The case was later transferred to the High Court in February 1984 for trial hearing on a later date.

== Trial hearing ==
=== Teo's defence ===
Teo Boon Ann, the 26-year-old temple medium charged with killing 66-year-old Chong Kin Meng during a robbery attempt

On 19 January 1987, 26-year-old Teo Boon Ann stood trial for the murder of 66-year-old Chong Kin Meng. He was represented by J. S. Khosa during the trial while the trial prosecutor was Ho Meng Hee. The two trial judges presiding Teo's trial were Justice Punch Coomaraswamy and Judicial Commissioner Chan Sek Keong.

In his trial defence, Teo claimed that he killed Teo in self-defence. He testified that on the day itself, he wanted to go rob the old woman, and entered her home under the pretense of passing to Chong a wedding invitation card for her foster son and some cakes. In fact, Teo had gone there on previous occasions to deliver religious goods to Chong. After Chong invited Teo inside her flat, Teo took the chance to ransack the flat while the elderly woman was not looking, but soon enough, Teo, who could not find any money, was caught in the act by Chong, who tried to reach a telephone to call the police but was stopped by Teo. Just when Teo went to the kitchen to retrieve the wedding card, he claimed Chong picked up a knife to attack him, and he was forced to grope at her neck to strangle her, but quickly let go after Chong said she cannot breathe. Then later, Chong once again tried to brandish the knife to charge at him, and Teo thus picked up a wooden stool to hurl at Chong, who got hit on the head and fell unconscious. Teo, who said he was full of panic and fear at that time, quickly left the flat after snatching the five-dollar note that laid next to the telephone. Overall, Teo denied killing Chong intentionally.

Teo's lawyer Khosa also took to argue that Teo should be convicted of a lower charge of culpable homicide not amounting to murder, since it was a killing committed in a heat of a fight and out of self-defence by Teo who was under attack from Chong, who posed a threat to him. He also pointed out that Teo choked Chong for only a short time before letting go of her, and it showed that Teo never intended to kill Chong.

=== Prosecution's arguments and evidence ===
Earlier on during the trial however, Professor Chao Tzee Cheng, the senior forensic pathologist who examined Chong's corpse, testified that according to his autopsy findings, he did not believe Teo killed Chong out of self-defence. He testified that there were extensive bruises on Chong's neck, arms and head, and that there were fractures to her ribs and thyroid cartilage, which resulted from Chong's death by strangulation. Professor Chao explained that the fractures and bruises on the neck could only be caused by strangulation with great force for a prolonged period of time, the rib fractures were due to someone sitting on top of her during the strangulation, and the head injuries were a result of Teo intentionally using the stool to violently hit at her head multiple times and with great force.

Professor Chao also pointed out that compared to a younger man like Teo and his lack of injuries, Chong, who was an old, helpless and frail woman, suffered from multiple injuries to her head and neck, as well as defensive injuries on her arms, which further proved that Chong definitely was not threatening enough for Teo to fear for his life and inflicted such brutal injuries on her, and it could only mean that Teo had in fact, taken undue advantage during the offence and also intended to murder Chong, and it was not out of self-defence.

Furthermore, Teo's 23-year-old girlfriend Tan Chai Mui came to court to testify that Teo had telephoned her, asking her to join him in a robbery plan, and also reminded her that they must kill Chong should there be the necessity to do so. Although Tan did not agree to join Teo in the killing, she had recorded that particular telephone conversation inside her diary and showed it to the court. Aside from this, it was further revealed that Teo had spoken to Tan on the phone under three different aliases, introducing himself as Richard Teo Min Hua, Ah Seng and Sunny, to talk about Teo's financial problems and persuaded Tan to lend Teo S$2,000 in cash and jewellery to help settle his debts, and Tan only physically met Teo while he was pretending to be Richard Teo, without recognizing him as Ah Seng or Sunny despite knowing his real name was Teo Boon Ann, given that Teo was able to make three different voices by mimicry to pose himself as three different persons when conversing with Tan on the phone. It led to her dating Teo, without the knowledge that Teo was already married and Teo's wife Low Bee Lay had also warned Tan about her boyfriend's real identity.

Based on the forensic evidence and Tan's testimony, the trial prosecutor Ho Meng Hee argued that Teo clearly had the premeditation and intention to commit murder when he entered Chong's flat with the intention to rob her. He also stated that there was utter brutality displayed by Teo during the "cruel and deliberate" attack he unleashed upon the elderly woman, who suffered extensive injuries. Ho also pointed out that the harm caused by Teo was excessive compared to the expected degree of harm caused by self-defence, and under the law, Teo himself did not deserve to claim a right to self-defence since he was clearly the aggressor when he entered Chong's home with the intent to rob and kill her. Ho also pointed out that based on Teo's behaviour, composure and conduct after the killing, it was clear that Teo displayed an utter lack of remorse and depraved of his conscience for his atrocity. As such, Ho argued in summary that the case of Chong's death was one of premeditated murder and urged the court to reject Teo's defences and convict him as charged.

== Verdict and appeal ==
On 3 February 1987, the trial judges - Justice Punch Coomaraswamy and Judicial Commissioner Chan Sek Keong - issued their written verdict.

Justice Coomaraswamy, who read out the verdict in court, stated that the judges did not believe that Teo had killed Chong in self-defence. They were of the opinion that Teo had raised the wooden stool to hit Chong on the head repeatedly with violence and considerable force. Justice Coomaraswamy also pointed out that the victim was physically no match for Teo given her advanced age and Teo's larger, stronger physical attributes, hence there was no point for her to put herself in danger by attacking Teo. They also stated that even if Chong really did attack Teo with a knife, the harm he caused in retaliation was overly out of proportion compared to the type of harm expected when inflicted in self-defence, and it could only be seen as cruelty in the eyes of the court. Furthermore, the judges determined that Teo committed the offence of intentional murder to ensure that Chong would not identify him as a witness and therefore caused Chong's death in such a callous and ruthless manner.

As such, the two judges found 26-year-old Teo Boon Ann guilty of murder, and awarded a death sentence to Teo. Under Singapore law, the death penalty was mandatory for murder and would be carried out by hanging if it was not commuted by the Court of Appeal or the President of Singapore. Teo was reportedly emotionless when he was sentenced to death, and there was no visible reaction from Teo's family and former girlfriend Tan, who were all present in court to hear the verdict. Teo was reportedly the first person to receive the death penalty in the year 1987 itself, after the previous year of 1986 when two death sentences were imposed to two people (including a woman), one for murder and another for drug trafficking.

On 15 August 1988, 28-year-old Teo Boon Ann lost his appeal against the death sentence and murder conviction, after the Court of Appeal's three judges upheld that the trial court had correctly rejected Teo's claims of self-defence since Teo had indeed cruelly killed Chong and caused excessive harm to the victim.

== Execution ==
On 20 April 1990, 30-year-old Teo Boon Ann was put to death at Changi Prison for killing 66-year-old Chong Kin Meng back in 1983. Around ten days after Teo's hanging, the Singapore Prison Service confirmed to the press that Teo's sentence had been carried out on that date itself at dawn, as per the death warrant issued for Teo. The case of Chong's murder was also mentioned to be the first case where police deployed a new fingerprint technology to identify the suspect behind Chong's murder and enable the successful prosecution of Teo for murder.

== Aftermath ==
In 1991, Singaporean crime show Crimewatch re-enacted the case of Chong's murder, and aired it on television.

The case went on to become one of the cases notably solved by senior forensic pathologist Chao Tzee Cheng, and he recorded inside his book Murder Is My Business, which recorded the memorable cases he solved during his career. In light of Professor Chao's death in 2000, the case of Chong Kin Meng's murder was recalled once again in the newspapers as one of the significant cases solved by him.

In 2015, the murder case was dramatized in Whispers of the Dead, a Singapore crime show which covers the former cases taken by Professor Chao. Inside the episode, for dramatic purposes and privacy, the killer Teo Boon Ann's name was changed to Kuek Ah Heng, and the victim Chong Kin Meng's name was changed to Tay Choon Lup as well.

== See also ==
- Capital punishment in Singapore
- Chao Tzee Cheng
