= Ashok Mirpuri =

Singaporean diplomat

Ashok Kumar Mirpuri
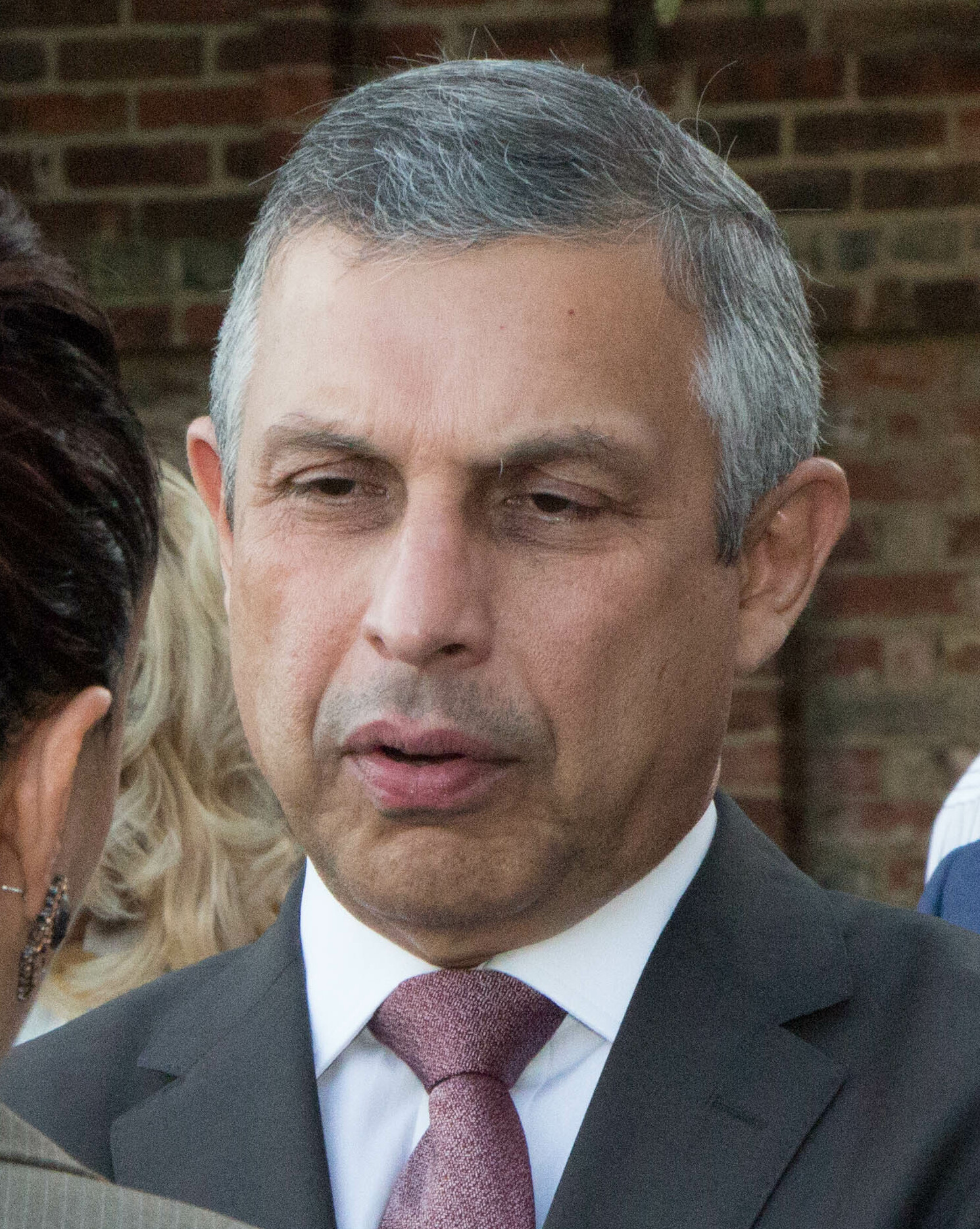
- Mirpuri in 2014

Singapore Ambassador to the United States
- In office July 30, 2012 – June 2023
- Minister: Vivian Balakrishnan
- Preceded by: Chan Heng Chee
- Succeeded by: Lui Tuck Yew

Singapore Ambassador to Indonesia
- In office 2006–2012
- Minister: George Yeo, K. Shanmugam
- Preceded by: Edward Lee Kwong Foo
- Succeeded by: Anil Kumar Nair

Singapore High Commissioner to Malaysia
- In office 2002–2006
- Minister: S. Jayakumar, George Yeo
- Succeeded by: T. Jasudasen

Singapore High Commissioner to Australia
- In office 2000–2022
- Minister: S. Jayakumar
- Succeeded by: Joseph Koh

Personal details
- Born: December 13, 1959 (age 66)
- Spouse: Gouri Mirpuri
- Children: 2

Ashok Kumar Mirpuri (born December 13, 1959) is a Singaporean diplomat and the former Singapore Ambassador to the United States and to Indonesia.

== Early life and education ==
Mirpuri was born and raised in Singapore. His father, who came to Singapore from India in the late 1930s, was a trader. His mother came after World War II.

Mirpuri attended the National University of Singapore. He graduated from the university in 1984 with honors and a Bachelor of Social Science in Political Science. Afterwards, Mirpuri received a Raffles Scholarship to study at the School of Oriental & African Studies (SOAS) in London, England. He completed his Master's degree at SOAS in 1992. He also attended the Program for Executive Development at the Institute for Management Development in Switzerland and the Advanced Management Program at Harvard Business School in the United States.

== Career ==
Mirpuri joined the Ministry of Foreign Affairs in 1984 when he joined the Singapore Administrative Service. From 1987 to 1991, he served his first overseas posting as a political first secretary at the Singapore Embassy in Jakarta, Indonesia, before returning to Singapore to serve in the Ministry of Foreign Affairs Policy Planning & Analysis Directorate I (South East Asia) in 1992. He led the Directorate from 1994 to 1996. The year after, he served a rotation with Shell International Ltd in the United Kingdom, where he served as a corporate advisor for the Asia Pacific.

He returned to the Singapore Embassy in Jakarta in 1998 as Minister-Counsellor and Deputy Chief of Mission. From 2000 to 2002, Mirpuri served his first ambassadorship as Singapore's High Commissioner to Australia. From 2002 to 2006, he was High Commissioner to Malaysia. While in Kuala Lumpur, he represented Singapore in its ratification of a Special Agreement to refer its dispute over Pedra Branca with Malaysia to the International Court of Justice.

Afterwards, Mirpuri returned to Jakarta for the third time, serving as Ambassador to Indonesia from July 2006 to 2012. In July 2012, he became Singapore's 7th Ambassador to the United States. During his tenure, President Barack Obama hosted Singapore Prime Minister Lee Hsien Loong for a state visit. Mirpuri served in Washington, D.C. from July 2012 until June 2023, making him the country's second-longest serving Ambassador to the US, after Ambassador Chan Heng Chee.

In September 2023, Mirpuri joined Temasek, one of Singapore's sovereign wealth funds, as Head of International Policy & Governance.

== Awards and recognitions ==
While serving as Ambassador to Indonesia in 2010, Mirpuri was awarded the Pingat Pentadbiran Awam Emas, or Gold Public Administration Medal. In 2021, he was named one of Asia's Most Influential People by Tatler magazine.

== Personal life ==
Mirpuri is married to Gouri Uppal, the co-founder of the Learning Farm, a non-profit in West Java, Indonesia. They have one daughter and one son. Mirpuri enjoys golfing and running.
