= Ernest Steven Monteiro =

Singaporean physician and diplomat (1904–1989)

Ernest Steven Monteiro CBE FRS BBM PJG FRFPS
- Monteiro in 1968

Singapore Ambassador to the United States
- In office January 1969 – September 1976
- Preceded by: Wong Lin Ken
- Succeeded by: Punch Coomaraswamy

Singapore Ambassador to Cambodia
- In office 1966–1968

Personal details
- Born: 21 December 1904 Singapore, Straits Settlements
- Died: 2 March 1989 (aged 84) Singapore
- Cause of death: Liver failure
- Spouse(s): Una Marie Lewis (div. 1971) Ling Mie Hean (m. 1971–1989)
- Children: 5
- Education: St Anthony's School; Raffles Institution; King Edward VII College of Medicine
- Occupation: Physician; diplomat

Ernest Steven Monteiro CBE FRS BBM PJG FRFPS (21 December 1904 – 2 March 1989) was a Singaporean physician and diplomat. Specialising in preventive medicine, he also served as the Singapore Ambassador to Brazil, Cambodia and the United States.

== Early life and education ==
Monteiro was born in Singapore in 1904. He was educated in St Anthony's School, Raffles Institution and King Edward VII College of Medicine.

== Career ==
Monteiro started his medical career in Tan Tock Seng Hospital (TTSH) in 1929.

During the Japanese Occupation, Monteiro was Director of Middleton Hospital for Infectious Diseases, which was TTSH's infectious diseases wing and a predecessor of National Centre for Infectious Diseases in Singapore. He discovered that the available quantity of diphtheria antitoxin was depleting. He exposed live goats to diphtheria to create more antitoxin.

After completing his post-graduate studies on a Queen's Scholarship in 1949, he was elected head of Faculty of Medicine of the then University of Malaya, Singapore in 1956–1960.

In 1958, he started to use Sabin vaccine on a mass scale to protect young children and adults from polio to wipe-out beri-beri with Vitamin B-1 and eliminated diphtheria in children. By 1977, diphtheria and polio had become things of the past for Singaporeans.

Upon his retirement in 1965, he was appointed the Emeritus Professor and Pro-Chancellor of National University of Singapore. Monteiro taught many medical students from Singapore and Malaysia. Among his students were Mahathir Mohamad (former Prime Minister of Malaysia) and Siti Hasmah Mohamad Ali. He played a major role in establishing high standard of medical practice in Singapore.

Monteiro was appointed the first Ambassador of Singapore to Cambodia in 1966–1968 and to United States and Brazil in 1969–1976.

Monteiro came back home in 1977 and continued his private practice as a physician.

== Family and death ==
Monteiro died of liver failure on 2 March 1989. He divorced Una Marie Lewis, his first wife, in April 1971, and secretly married Ling Mie Hean in August 1971 in Washington. He has two sons (Dr Edmund Hugh Monteiro and Dr Gerald Monteiro) and 2 daughters (Jean and Irene) from the first marriage and a son, John Monteiro, from the second marriage.

== Honours ==
Monteiro was appointed Commander of the Order of the British Empire (CBE) in 1957 Birthday Honours. The Republic of Singapore awarded him Bintang Bakti Masyarakat (BBM) in 1963 and the Pingat Jasa Gemilang (PJG) in 1968. He was also named a Fellow of the Royal Society in 1972 for the Promotion of Health for his achievements in preventive medicine. In 1973, he was awarded an International Award for Distinguished Service of the US National Kidney Foundation.

Diplomatic posts
| New title | Ambassador of Singapore to Cambodia; 1966 – 1968 | Unknown |
| Preceded by Wong Lin Ken | Ambassador of Singapore to the United States; 1969 – 1976 | Succeeded by Punch Coomaraswamy |
