= G. Ramachandran =

- Born: 23 May 1931
- Died: 6 March 2018 (aged 86); Chennai, India
- Education: Victoria School
- Occupation: Businessman
- Parent: P. Govindasamy Pillai (father)

G. Ramachandran (23 May 1931 – 6 March 2018) was a former president of the Singapore Indian Chamber of Commerce and Industry (SICCI). He was the President during the years 1966–1968, 1973–1974, 1982–1984, 1985–1986, and was its youngest president.

== Education ==
Ramachandran studied at Victoria School from 1947 to 1949.

== Career ==
After his father died in 1980, G. Ramachandran took over the family business. Like his father, he was a well-known and popular leader of the Indian community in Singapore.

== Personal life ==
The first son of the seven children of businessman and philanthropist, P. Govindasamy Pillai, Ramachandran was born on 23 May 1931.

Ramachandran returned to Chennai, India after retirement.
