= Murder of Frankie Tan =

1984 murder in Singapore

- Date: 24 October 1984; 41 years ago
- Location: Laguna Park, Singapore
- Motive: To get revenge for Tan's repeated infidelity and affair with sister-in-law
- Deaths: Tan Tik Siah (a.k.a. Frankie Tan), 39
- Suspects: Vasavan Sathiadew (a.k.a. Augustine Tan Kim Siah), 41; Lee Chee Poh (Rose Lee), 50; Wan Phatong, 21; Phan Khenapim, 42; Buakkan Vajjarin (a.k.a. Ah Poo), age unknown

Frankie Tan Tik Siah, the 39-year-old murder victim

On the night of 24 October 1984, a 39-year-old American Express banker, Tan Tik Siah, otherwise known as Frankie Tan, was ambushed and attacked by four men as he arrived home from work in Singapore. He was strangled to death by his assailants and his body was found by his wife, who reported the murder to the police. Three of the assailants and the victim's wife (who was in fact aware of the murder plot all along) were arrested and charged in the death.

The murder was a classic case of a crime of passion that started with the extramarital affairs Frankie Tan had engaged in and the abuse of his wife, which led the wife, Lee Chee Poh, and Tan's adoptive brother Vasavan Sathiadew to plot the killing as revenge for the victim's infidelity and abuse. Poh and Sathiadew paid three Thai construction workers to murder Tan.

Throughout the 45-day murder trial, the three murderers, who challenged the validity of their confessions, tried to deny their guilt in the trial by pleading diminished responsibility and placing the blame on the fourth man and fugitive who was still missing as of today, blaming him as the one who killed Frankie Tan while their intention was merely to wallop the murdered victim. The lower division of the Supreme Court of Singapore rejected these defences and sentenced the three killers to death. The death sentences were affirmed by the Supreme Court's higher division and this affirmation resulted in the trio's executions on 23 October 1992. Lee Chee Poh was the only one of these four accused who escaped execution and instead received a 7-year prison sentence in a separate trial for manslaughter due to the sympathetic circumstances surrounding her life under the abuse of Tan, which drove her to the plot to kill her husband.

== The crime ==
=== Discovery ===
At around 2:15 in the morning of 25 October 1984, after some shopping and a session of mahjong with her friends, 50-year-old married housewife Lee Chee Poh (simplified Chinese: 李枝宝; traditional Chinese: 李枝寶; pinyin: lǐ zhībǎo), also known as Rose Lee, returned home. As she entered through the front door of her Laguna Park flat, she would make a shocking discovery. As she entered the study room of her banker husband Tan Tik Siah (simplified Chinese: 陈铁城; traditional Chinese: 陳鐵城; pinyin: chén tǐechéng), also known as Frankie Tan, Lee was shocked to see her 39-year-old husband lying there dead with a nylon rope around his neck, and bruises on his face and body. Full of grief and distraught at the sight of her husband's dead body, Lee managed to wake up her neighbour and seek help.

Police found no signs of a forced entry or no signs of anything missing from the flat. An autopsy by forensic pathologist Dr Clarence Tan (unrelated to the victim Frankie Tan) later showed that the cause of Tan's death was asphyxia by strangulation; he died sometime between 8 pm to 10 pm the night before on 24 October 1984. The rope was uniformly tied around Tan's neck six times. From the manner of Tan's injuries, Dr Clarence Tan believed that there were at least two people involved in the murder of Tan, who was then a vice-president and regional treasurer of American Express.

=== Lee Chee Poh's confession and the accomplices' capture ===
The case was classified as murder. The case was assigned to Inspector Teo Cheow Beng of the Criminal Investigation Department (CID), who headed the police investigations. The murdered victim's wife, Lee Chee Poh, was brought in for questioning and confessed that she was a part of a plot to murder her husband, and implicated her 41-year-old brother-in-law Vasavan Sathiadew in the plot. Vasavan, who was the adoptive elder brother of Frankie Tan, was soon arrested at the Ang Mo Kio flat of Mdm Sim, the birth mother of Tan, and also Vasavan's adoptive mother. Vasavan, who grew up in a Chinese family since 1959 after his father drove him out and thus adopted both a Chinese name, Tan Kim Siah (simplified Chinese: 陈金城; traditional Chinese: 陳金城; pinyin: chén jīnchéng), and an English name, Augustine, told police that he had hired and paid three Thai men to go with him to assault and murder his foster brother due to Tan having an affair with Amnoi, Vasavan's Thai wife, with whom Vasavan had a son (born in 1977) and daughter (born in 1969). According to news reports, Vasavan shared the closest bond to Tan among all of his adoptive three brothers, before the deterioration of their relationship due to the alleged affair between Tan and Vasavan's wife.

With Vasavan's statements, the police officers went to a construction site where Vasavan worked as a foreman, and arrested a Thai construction worker, 42-year-old Phan Khenapim (also spelt Phan Khenapin), who came from Northern Thailand and worked in Singapore since 1981. Phan was said to be one of the Thai accomplices who murdered Tan. Another Thai worker from another construction site, 21-year-old Wan Phatong (also spelt Wan Pathong), was also arrested for his alleged involvement in the murder. A third Thai accomplice, Buakkan Vajjarin, more commonly referred to as Ah Poo, was never caught. All four arrested were charged with murder.

== Trial of Lee Chee Poh ==
=== Lee Chee Poh's story ===
==== Relationship with Frankie Tan ====
On 17 October 1988, Lee Chee Poh stood trial alone for her abetment of her husband's murder, represented by lawyer Loh Lin Kok (who was the former lawyer of the 1983 Andrew Road triple murderer Sek Kim Wah). By then, the prosecution agreed to, on account of Lee's full cooperation with the police and remorse over her husband's death, reduce Lee's charge to one of abetment of culpable homicide not amounting to murder. Lee pleaded guilty and was convicted of the reduced charge. At the trial, it was then a story of how a budding romance ended in tragedy was told in the High Court.

Lee Chee Poh, who came from Malacca, Malaysia to Singapore for a better life, first met Frankie Tan sometime in the early or mid-1960s at a cabaret where she had been working for the past 10 years. Despite their 11-year age difference, Lee became romantically involved with Tan, and in 1966, she forked out her earnings to allow Tan to go to night school, where he graduated and completed his secondary school education. The couple were married in 1969, and they resided in Tan's mother's kampong house in Potong Pasir.

The next year, the couple moved into a two-room Housing and Development Board flat in Jalan Toa Payoh; by then, Tan was employed in the Amex bank. At some point in the early 1970s, Tan was embroiled in stock market difficulties, and in order to help her husband, Lee raised $20,000 out of her jewellery and savings. The couple later moved to their current home in a flat in Laguna Park in 1975. They had no children.

==== Discovery of Tan's infidelity and later abuse ====
In early 1981, Lee Chee Poh picked up a call from a distressed Vasavan Sathiadew, who informed her of a shocking event that he discovered from his wife Amnoi. Lee was full of disbelief when she heard Vasavan telling her that Amnoi had confessed to him earlier on that she, in fact, had been sleeping with Lee's husband for 11 years since their 1969 marriage. After cutting the call, Lee questioned her husband if it was true; Tan said yes, but defensively said that Amnoi seduced him first. It also came to light that Tan was philandering for other women during their years of marriage, and in addition to his adoptive brother Vasavan's wife, he had also had illicit affairs with the wives of his two other unnamed brothers, and his secretary.

As a result of this incident, Tan began to grow more unfaithful to his wife and more abusive towards her. Two years before his violent death, Tan brought home a 25-year-old divorcee named Thereisa Lee (unrelated to Lee Chee Poh) and let her live with them. After bringing the mistress back home every night, Tan told Lee (his wife) to sleep in another bedroom while he shared their bedroom with Thereisa Lee. By this time, he had attained a high-ranking position in the bank. He also later brought both Lee and his mistress overseas to Japan and the United States to allow Lee to get to know the mistress better and accept her as part of the family. During that period, he began to introduce Thereisa Lee to people as his wife, and he fathered a son with her. Lee had long resigned herself to her husband's philandering even before the appearance of Thereisa Lee, and despite the frequent abuses which Tan brought upon her, Lee still loved him and hoped that he could stop ill-treating her.

Finally, one day in 1984, Tan told Lee, his wife of 15 years, that he wanted a divorce. Despite consenting to it, Lee asked the ownership of their Laguna Park flat be given to her should the divorce be granted and finalized. Tan rejected. At the same time, Vasavan, who thirsted for revenge on Tan, who he fell out with, for the earlier adulterous affair between him and Amnoi, had been persuading Lee to have her husband killed since it was for certain that Tan would never make amends with her. Although she schemed with Vasavan to use black magic to kill Tan for his repeated infidelity and abuse, Lee maintained her love for her husband and never wanted him to die; in her heart, she still held on to the hope of her husband going back to her.

Two days before the fateful night on 24 October 1984, when Lee Chee Poh went to the airport to fetch her husband, Tan once again abused and ill-treated her. Lee's endurance finally snapped and she consented to Vasavan's plot to murder her husband. Lee Chee Poh gave Vasavan the spare keys to their flat and $4,500 as payment to those whom Vasavan would hire to murder Tan. Vasavan assured her that her husband's death would look natural with black magic. Still, despite so, Lee had never wanted her husband to die all along and she would have called off the murder had Tan treated her nicely; she also wanted to dissuade Vasavan from killing Tan on the day of the murder itself but could not reach him by phone.

=== Lee Chee Poh's sentence ===
On 17 October 1988, the same date of her conviction by the High Court, High Court Judge Punch Coomaraswamy sentenced 54-year-old Lee Chee Poh to seven years' imprisonment. Additionally, the seven-year sentence was backdated to 26 October 1984, the date of Lee's remand; with one-third remission for good behaviour, Lee would effectively only need to serve four years and eight months. Since she served with good behaviour, and the sentence being backdated to four years earlier, Lee would be released eight months later in June 1989.

During sentencing, Justice Coomaraswamy took into consideration the tragic life which Lee had gone through with her abusive marriage and her remorse over the incident. He expressed his sympathy to Lee for her plight. In his own words while delivering the judgement, Justice Coomaraswamy said to Lee, "That he (Frankie Tan) treated you cruelly in bringing a mistress (Thereisa Lee) home from time to time and making you sleep in another bedroom proves him to be an extremely callous person. I think you had put up with a lot." Lee reportedly broke down as she received the sentence.

However, the murder charges against Lee's brother-in-law Vasavan Sathiadew, and the two of Vasavan's three Thai accomplices Phan Khenapim and Wan Phatong remained. As the crime of murder under Singapore law carries the mandatory death penalty, should they be found guilty, all three men would be sentenced to death. Lee Chee Poh later became the prosecution's key witness against the three men, who all stood trial a month after her release.

== Trial of the three men ==
=== The prosecution's case ===
The trial of Vasavan Sathiadew and his two Thai accomplices Phan Khenapim and Wan Phatong began on 3 July 1989. All three men stood trial before two High Court judges – Judicial Commissioner Joseph Grimberg and Justice T. S. Sinnathuray (he was one of the two judges who sentenced the three child killers of the 1981 Toa Payoh Ritual Murders to death 6 years earlier) – in the High Court of Singapore. Prominent lawyer Leo Fernando was assigned to defend Vasavan, and Fernando was also assisted by another lawyer Remesha Pillai throughout the trial. Two other lawyers, Lim Choon Mong (the father of Singaporean opposition politician Sylvia Lim of the Workers' Party) and V. C. S. Vardan, were also assigned to defend Phan and Wan respectively. Till then, the police were still tracing the whereabouts of the missing Ah Poo, the third and last Thai accomplice.

==== Lee Chee Poh's testimony and cross-examination ====
The prosecution's case was largely based on the police statements given by the three men, and also the testimony of Lee Chee Poh, who took the stand as the prosecution's key witness. On the stand, she was extensively cross-examined by the three men's lawyers. When cross-examined by Fernando, Lee disagreed with Fernando's claim that there was never any plot to murder her husband, but just to beat him up. She did, however, agreed that till then, there was no agreement to kill her husband in any other way other than black magic, and she also told the court that Vasavan told her that the black magic would be powerful and make the death look natural. When she was cross-examined by Mr Lim (Phan's lawyer) and Mr Vardan (Wan's lawyer) respectively, Lee agreed that all along, she never wanted her husband to die. She disagreed with Mr Lim's suggestion that she was compelled into testifying against the three men in the murder trial after the prosecution reduced her charge while conceding with Mr Vardan's suggestion that Tan meant a lot to her and she was being totally dependent on him, which was why she could not likely want to kill her "golden goose". Not only that, during her cross-examination by Mr Lim, Lee said that even before the discovery of her husband's illicit affair with Thereisa Lee, she was already aware of his womanising and his affairs with all his three sister-in-laws (including Vasavan's wife Amnoi) and secretary. When asked if she ever tried to put a stop to it or object to these affairs, she answered that she could not do anything about it, as her husband was "such a person".

==== Validity of the statements ====
Inspector Lim Cheow Beng also took the stand. He read out the statements from Vasavan, in which Vasavan had admitted to the conspiracy with Lee to murder Tan, hiring and pay the three Thai men to help him commit the murder, and buying the 10 m long nylon rope to kill Tan while denying that he was involved in the grievous assault and murder of Tan despite being at the scene (however, Wan's statement said that Vasavan was involved in the attack). However, through his lawyer, Vasavan challenged the validity of the statements, claiming that they were not given voluntarily. Similarly, Phan and Wan also claimed that their statements were not given voluntarily. Phan said that he was illiterate and could not understand the charge he was facing or what he was charged with until the beginning of the trial; he claimed that he completely could not understand the Thai interpreter because he was illiterate and being from a remote village in Northern Thailand, where a different dialect was used. He also said that he was forced to make the statements after being assaulted by the police interrogators during questioning.

After a lengthy trial-within-a-trial, the two judges admitted the oral statements of all three men as evidence. They also accept the written statements of Wan and Vasavan, but reject Phan's written statements in view of his illiteracy.

=== The defence's case ===
All three of the accused put up a common defence – they did not deny being at the flat. They said that they only intended to beat up Frankie Tan, and all pinpointed the missing Ah Poo as the sole member of the four who strangled Tan to death with the rope procured by Vasavan. Despite giving a common defence, they gave three different versions of what exactly happened at the flat.

==== Phan's testimony ====
Phan Khenapim, a worker of Vasavan's workplace

Phan was the first of the three to go onto the stand to testify. Phan said that Vasavan asked him to help assault a Chinese man who molested his daughter. He said that no monetary terms were discussed. According to Phan, on that night itself, he brought along both Ah Poo and Wan after agreeing with Vasavan to assist him in the assault. After arriving at Tan's flat, Phan said all four of them hid in Tan's bedroom and waited in ambush until Tan arrived home. Ah Poo was the first to attack Tan in his study room, followed by Phan and Vasavan, and finally Wan. Later, after he assaulted Tan, Phan said he left the room out of increasing fear to join Wan, who left the room first. He said that Vasavan also followed them. Ah Poo was the last to leave the room.

==== Wan's testimony ====
Wan Phatong, Phan's friend from another worksite

Wan was the second defendant to give his testimony after Phan. He said that when he first met Vasavan for drinks with Phan and Ah Poo, he did not know about their plans to assault Tan, and simply followed the others till they reached Tan's flat. He said that it was only then they arrived and entered the apartment he was informed that they were going to beat up Tan. Wan said that he reluctantly agreed to help since he had followed them. He said Ah Poo first attacked Tan before Phan and Vasavan joined in. Wan, who was the last to join, said that he was shocked and scared after witnessing the assault. For this, he left the room first, and he was followed by Phan and later Vasavan. Similar to Phan's testimony, Wan said that Ah Poo was the last to leave the room and had stayed in the room the longest. In the lift on the way down, Wan said that Vasavan paid the three of them $1,000 each; he said he initially did not accept the money but Ah Poo insisted and shoved it into his hand.

==== Vasavan's testimony ====
Vasavan Sathiadew, Tan's foster brother who masterminded the killing

Vasavan was the last of the accused to go onto the stand. Vasavan not only denied that he had any motive or intention to murder Tan, he claimed to be suffering from acute severe reactive depression. Veronica Sathiadew, Vasavan's 20-year-old daughter, corroborated this evidence, saying that ever since her mother's affair with her uncle Frankie Tan came to light, her father became very reserved and locked himself in his room. There were also frequent quarrels between her parents, according to Veronica, who also added that her father would throw things around and even slapped her mother. It is not known if Vasavan's unnamed son went to court to testify for his father.

It was only then a sense of peace returned to the family when Vasavan began going to church, but the arguments began again in early 1984 when Lee Chee Poh telephoned him frequently about his and her marital issues. Dr Wong Yip Chong, a notable psychiatrist, testified on the stand to support Vasavan's defence of diminished responsibility, stating that Vasavan was suffering from an abnormality of mind at the time of the crime. However, Dr Wong told the court that he did not believe his patient Vasavan when he said his intention was just to beat up, not kill, his adoptive brother. When asked if he had come across a case or medical evidence of diminished responsibility being raised when the accused was not present at the actual killing, Dr Wong conceded that he had not.

Vasavan also told the court of how he came to know about the affair. He said that in one particular night, when he showed his wife the family album and photographs of the victim Frankie Tan, Vasavan asked his wife if his foster brother was handsome; it was then he realised something was amiss when he heard Amnoi answering to him that Tan looked ugly and was more uglier without his pants on when he slept with her, and he discovered his wife's 11-year-long affair with Tan after further questioning. Amnoi, who denied that she had an affair while testifying in court, told Vasavan that night she did so because of a wife-swapping arrangement which Tan told her about, an arrangement Tan claimed to have made with Vasavan. Vasavan, who in fact did not have any sexual encounter with his sister-in-law and never made such an arrangement with Tan, felt betrayed and deceived about it and confronted Tan (who denied the affair) about it. This led to the deterioration of the brothers' relationship and that of Vasavan and his wife, and Vasavan said that he felt that his whole world had crumbled and could see his wife and Tan on bed together, having sex, which made him see Tan as a "desperately indecent sex maniac". He not only argued with Amnoi frequently, he became suspicious of her movements and also contemplated suicide twice in the first three months after discovering Tan's treachery.

Vasavan additionally denied that he first suggested to Lee to kill her husband or using black magic to kill Tan. He insisted that he had no intention to cause Tan's death and only told the three Thais, whom he recruited, to beat up Tan and not to kill him. He also said he did not buy the rope used to strangle Tan to death beforehand and said he did so at the spur of the moment (for the purpose to tie up Tan before assaulting him instead of strangulation). He said that he did not conspire with Lee or the others to kill Tan, and only told the Thais to help him beat up Tan under the pretext of his daughter being molested by a man, whom he did not name but pointed out as Tan. When cross-examined by the lawyers of Phan and Wan, he said the meeting with Phan was not pre-arranged and the plan to buy the rope was not carried out before 24 October 1984.

When cross-examined by Deputy Public Prosecutor (DPP) Bala Reddy, who led the prosecuting team, Vasavan denied the fact that he confessed to the police about his plan to kill Tan when DPP Reddy pointed out what he said in his oral and police statements. He insisted that he only wanted to beat up the victim and not to cause death. He denied any part in the killing and reiterated his denial of his motive to murder Tan to avenge himself for the adultery between Tan and Amnoi.

The trial lasted for 45 days. Judgement was reserved until 6 October 1989.

=== Verdict ===
On 6 October 1989, nearly 5 years after the murder of Frankie Tan, the High Court was ready with the verdict, with Judicial Commissioner (JC) Joseph Grimberg delivering the verdict. In their 82-page judgement, which took 90 minutes to read, both JC Grimberg and Justice T. S. Sinnathuray found all the three men guilty of murder and sentenced them to death.

JC Grimberg said in court that from their determination, there was no doubt that all the three men, together with the missing Ah Poo, had a common intention to attack and strangle Tan and all four of them had done so in Tan's study. They rejected the defences of all three men that they had only intend to beat up Tan and not to kill. In his own words, JC Grimberg referred to the pathologist's autopsy report and said, "At some stage, one of the assailants sat upon Tan's chest, and as he struggled and fought back, a rope procured by Vasavan was double looped round his neck three times and pulled extremely tight by at least two, probably by all four, of the attackers, and secured in a tight knot. The consequent intense constricting force caused fractures to the horns of Tan's thyroid cartilage, bringing about Tan's death by asphyxia, within two or three minutes", which implicitly revealed the judges' acceptance that the strangulation of Tan was made by more than one or all of the attackers rather than Ah Poo alone.

JC Grimberg also said they did not believe that Vasavan was indeed suffering from any depression at the time of the murder. They also said that in accordance to the plan and his awareness of Tan's martial arts knowledge and physical strength, Vasavan had hired the three Thais to do the job and had the awareness of what he was doing. They also pointed that after they murdered Tan, Vasavan had paid the Thais $1,000 each for their completion of the task, and even further arranged for an additional payment of $1,500 to Phan, who was set to leave Singapore for Thailand shortly after the crime, before their arrests. Even though they regarded her as an accomplice, the judges accepted Lee Chee Poh as a truthful witness and accepted her testimony against her brother-in-law and the two Thais.

As the death sentence was passed upon them in a packed courtroom, both Vasavan and Phan were reportedly calm while Wan wiped his tears. Vasavan's daughter Veronica broke down and wept after seeing her father being sentenced to death.

== Aftermath ==
=== Appeal and executions ===
After they were convicted and sentenced to death, all three men – Vasavan Sathiadew, Phan Khenapim and Wan Phatong – filed appeals which were dismissed by the Court of Appeal of Singapore on 16 April 1992. This decision effectively finalized the death sentences of the three men. It is not known if all three men had appealed to the Judicial Committee of the Privy Council from London against their sentences or to the President of Singapore for clemency; if they did, it is most probable that their appeals were dismissed.

On 23 October 1992, almost eight years after the murder of Frankie Tan, the three men – Vasavan, Phan and Wan – were all hanged in Changi Prison. Vasavan's body was collected by his daughter Veronica, while the bodies of Phan and Wan went unclaimed; it is not known what happened to their remains.

=== Aftermath ===
This case was re-enacted for the Singaporean crime show True Files. It first aired as the eleventh episode of the show's second season on 4 November 2003. Both Lee and Vasavan's lawyers were approached for interviews to speak about their thoughts on the case. Loh Lin Kok, who represented Lee Chee Poh, stated that his client's case was truly a "classic case of conscience pricking her", where she immediately confessed to her acts instead of going according to plan to conceal her involvement in the crime. When coming to the concept of "crimes of passion", Loh commented that a lot of self-control was needed to harness oneself when there comes a moment where one is supposed to snap, and there is nothing that could stop it when that moment comes as controlling it is easier said than done. Vasavan's lawyer Leo Fernando said that what Vasavan should have done when such moments come to him, he should not have impulsively go and purchase a rope and unnecessarily gathering up other people to get involved even if it means beating his own brother up and he should have just sit down, think the whole thing through and have a family meeting to sort out the issues.

As of today, Ah Poo, the third Thai accomplice and final culprit of the murder, was never found.

== See also ==
- Capital punishment in Singapore
