= Singapore Council of Women =

The Singapore Council of Women (SCW) was an organization based in Singapore. The group advocated for women's rights and was especially vocal on issues relating to women and marriage. The SCW also made sure it had a good relationship with the media, and wrote often to newspapers about women's issues. SCW lectured on women's rights in various neighborhoods in Singapore. The advocacy efforts of SCW helped speed the passage of the Women's Charter.

== History ==
The idea to create a women's council came about at a meeting consisting of Malay women in October 1951. Shirin Fozdar held a public meeting where women, such as Elizabeth Choy, Vilasini Menon, Mrs. Robert Eu and Amy Laycock came to decide what such a group would look like. The SCW was based on the National Council of Women in India, which was an inspiration to the women at the meeting. The Singapore Council of Women (SCW) was formally created on April 4, 1952. Fozdar served as the first secretary, and Tan Cheng Hiong was the first president. The executive committee of the SCW was very diverse in nature, featuring women of Chinese, Malay, Eurasian and European heritage. Membership was at its peak of around 2,000 in 1955.

During the 1950s, the SCW campaigned against the practice of polygamy, advocated for child care and lobbied the government to make reforms in prostitution. SCW was also concerned about women and divorce practices of the time. In February 1953, the SCW opened a girls club at the Joo Chiat Welfare Centre. In 1959, the SCW lobbied the country's political parties to include women's rights under marriage in their platforms. The lobbying of the SCW helped speed the passage of the Women's Charter and the Muslim Ordinance.

SCW lost much of its momentum after the passage of laws protecting women's rights. The group dissolved in 1971 after there had been a decline in membership.

== Notable members ==
- Checha Davies
- Shirin Fozdar
- Tan Cheng Hiong
