= List of ambassadors of Singapore to the United States =

Coordinates: 38°56′33.8″N 77°3′55.5″W

Singapore Ambassador to the United States
- Inaugural holder: Wong Lin Ken
- Formation: 7 April 1967; 59 years ago

The Singapore ambassador to the United States is the official representative of the Republic of Singapore to the United States of America.

== List of representatives ==
Ambassador	Diplomatic agreement	Diplomatic accreditation	Term end	Background	President of Singapore	Prime Minister of Singapore	President of the United States
Wong Lin Ken	17 March 1967	7 April 1967	December 1968	He served concurrently as the Ambassador to the United States, to the United Nations, and to Brazil. He was a historian with first class Honours and an MA from the University of Malaya, and a PhD from London University. He was later appointed minister for home affairs.	Yusof Ishak	Lee Kuan Yew	Lyndon B. Johnson
Ernest Steven Monteiro	30 January 1969	31 January 1969	September 1976	Born in 1904, died in 1989. From 1966 to 1968 he was First Ambassador to Cambodia. From 1969 to 1976 he was Ambassador to the US. Diplomacy was a second career for Professor Monteiro, who retired from the Chair of Clinical Medicine at the University of Singapore in May 1965.	Benjamin Sheares	Lee Kuan Yew	Richard Nixon
Punch Coomaraswamy	8 October 1976	30 November 1976	August 1984	Born 16 October 1925 in Malaysia. He is married and has two sons and one daughter. He received an LL.B from Nottingham and was Barrister-at-law, Lincoln's Inn, London. He was awarded the public service star in 1976. From 1956 to 1966 he continued in law practice.	Benjamin Sheares; Devan Nair	Lee Kuan Yew	Gerald Ford; Jimmy Carter; Ronald Reagan
Tommy Koh	20 August 1984	26 November 1984	June 1990	He served concurrently as the Ambassador to the United States and to the United Nations.	Devan Nair; Wee Kim Wee	Lee Kuan Yew	Ronald Reagan
S. R. Nathan	20 September 1990	24 October 1990	June 1996	Born in Singapore on 3 July 1924, and educated in the city.	Wee Kim Wee; Ong Teng Cheong	Lee Kuan Yew	George H. W. Bush; Bill Clinton
Chan Heng Chee	8 July 1996	29 July 1996	July 2012	Born 19 April 1942 in Singapore, educated at Katong Convent and the University of Singapore. She gained her master's degree at Cornell University.	Ong Teng Cheong; S. R. Nathan; Tony Tan	Goh Chok Tong; Lee Hsien Loong	Bill Clinton; George W. Bush; Barack Obama
Ashok Mirpuri	24 July 2012	30 July 2012	30 May 2023	Born 13 December 1959. He graduated with a Bachelor of Social Science (Honours, 2nd Class Upper) degree in Political Science from the National University of Singapore in 1984. He received his Master of Arts at the University of London's School of Oriental & African Studies in 1992 under a Raffles Scholarship. In May 1984, he joined the Ministry of Foreign Affairs. From 1987 to 1991 he was posted to the Singapore Embassy in Jakarta as First Secretary (Political).	Tony Tan; Halimah Yacob	Lee Hsien Loong	Barack Obama; Donald Trump; Joe Biden
Lui Tuck Yew	May 2023	30 May 2023	Incumbent	Born 16 August 1961. He graduated from the University of Cambridge. Served as 2-star admiral and then Chief of Navy in the Republic of Singapore Navy. Previously was Ambassador to Japan from 2017 to 2019 and then Ambassador to China from 2019 to 2023.	Halimah Yacob; Tharman Shanmugaratnam	Lee Hsien Loong; Lawrence Wong	Joe Biden; Donald Trump

== See also ==
- United States–Singapore relations
- List of ambassadors of the United States to Singapore
- Embassy of Singapore, Washington, D.C.
- List of ambassadors of Singapore
