= P. Govindasamy Pillai =

South Indian businessman and philanthropist in Singapore (1887–1980)

P. Govindasamy Pillai (Tamil: பி கோவிந்தசாமி பிள்ளை; 1887 – 21 July 1980), also known as PGP, was a revered successful South Indian businessman and philanthropist in Singapore. He was regarded as one of Singapore's early pioneers who helped shaped the nation-state by creating a once-famous chain called PGP stores during the 1900s which expanded to Johor Bahru and Malacca. Pillai was also highly regarded for his contributions to the South Indian community in Singapore, particularly his donations to the Sri Srinivasa Perumal Temple. He was notably one of the founding members of the Indian Chamber of Commerce in 1937, Ramakrishna Mission Singapore, as well as the Singapore Indian Association. In 1939, the British awarded him the Justice of Peace for helping Singapore with wartime efforts.

== Career ==
On one of his trips back home to India, Pillai married Pakiriammal. In 1929, Pillai this time with his new bride returned to Singapore. However, upon his return, he found out that he was no longer employed in the provision shop at Serangoon. This was due to the untimely death of the shop owner. As a result, Pillai and his wife had to lodge with a few friends temporarily. However, the store that he worked in previously was up in the market for sale 6 months later. Pillai saw a chance and took it by deciding to buy it himself. He took out a loan of S$2,000 from Indian moneylenders, who were then known as the Chettiars. In no time, Pillai's business flourished exponentially. The success motivated a venture into the textile business which eventually led him to open up a saree and textile shop next to the provision store. The village, Koorainadu, where Pillai came from was famous for its silk sarees. These sarees are adorned by Tamil women during ceremonial weddings. They are also known to have religious and historic significance in South India. This could have been the reason Pillai chose that line of commerce.

However, he lost his business in Singapore during the Japanese Occupation. Fortunately, they were back in India at that time and thus avoided experiencing the Occupation first-hand. Pillai had to start from scratch when he came back to Singapore in 1945.

It did not take long for Pillai's ventures to grow again, this time they expanded to areas, including wholesaling and distribution. He was able to set up a provision store, textile shops, and flour and spice mills. He even expanded his business as far as Malacca and Johor Bahru. He named the stores in Malacca Dhanalakshmi Stores, taking inspiration from the name of his eldest daughter. However, they were later rebranded and changed to P. Govindasamy Pillai or PGP Stores. Despite being a businessman, Pillai could not speak the English language. He could only converse in Malay and Tamil. It is worth mentioning that this did not deter him from having a strong rapport with the British community in Singapore who held key positions in shipping, banking, and trading establishments, with whom he conversed in Malay. This helped him build the social and business connections that were imperative to his success.

After stepping down from his business in 1963 and bequeathing the family venture worth S$3 million to his children, Pillai's sons opted to broaden the enterprise owing to the immense success of his saree shops. Initially situated in the area that now houses Little India Arcade, the PGP saree shop and supermarket were run by his daughter-in-law following the death of his youngest son, Dhanabalan. However, the stores faced significant debts and eventually ceased operations in 1998.

== Philanthropy ==
Pillai used his fortune to invest in properties around Serangoon Road, at Cuff Road, Race Course Road, Buffalo Road, Kerbau Road and Flower Road. He also used his money for philanthropic efforts where he donated generously to the South Indian community in Singapore. He helped founded the Ramakrishna Mission Singapore in 1928. The Ramakrishna Mission is part of the Ramakrishna movement from India, which aims to help aid people who are suffering. The Mission in Singapore mainly focuses on charitable endeavors, education, and promoting spiritual concepts. Pillai gave a generous donation and land to help construct the building at Bartley Road for the Mission to be based. He also helped with the finances of constructing the temple and the library in the building. The Mission carried out many charitable works. For example, during the war, the Mission aided the public by providing shelter, food, water, and medical attention. This could not have been possible if it were not for the contributions of Pillai.

He did not only provide monetary help as there are notable occasions where he would personally go down to events held by the Mission to help the less fortunate. In 1952, Pillai attended the opening of a new temple at Ramakrishna Mission. He took part in distributing free food like cakes and candies to the public there. Today, the Ramakrishna Mission of Singapore still remains a prominent charitable organization committed to helping those in need.

Apart from the Mission Work, Pillai's was also involved in helping the Singapore Indian Association which began in 1923. He gave money to the association. Around late 1951 and early 1952, the Association came up with a plan to help people of providing funds to those who were unemployed because they were terminally ill or old. A small committee was set up to oversee the collection of funds to build a hospice for these people under the Singapore Indian Association. Pillai was part of this committee.

Pillai was a devout Hindu, donating a large sum of money to the Sri Srinivasa Perumal Temple’s redevelopment works in the 1960s. The temple located in 387 Serangoon Road was renovated to include an entranceway tower, known as the gopuram, and the construction of a wedding hall. The wedding hall was one of the first Indian wedding halls in Singapore and bears Pillai's name. It goes by PGP Hall or PGP Kalyana Mandapam. The hall officially opened its doors on 19 June 1965, by the first president of Singapore, Yusof bin Ishak. Pillai felt very personal about his endeavours so much so that the first wedding to happen in this hall was that of his son Ramakrishnan and granddaughter.

Pillai's generosity extended beyond the Indian community, and he was actively involved in various philanthropic endeavours, supporting diverse sectors and ethnicities in Singapore. He made contributions to the University of Malaya and also sponsored a room in Mount Alvernia Hospital. He even brought his daughter along with him when he visited the sick in hospitals.

== Personal life ==
Pillai was born and raised in an Indian village called Koorainadu, in Mayavaram where it was part of the Tanjore District. Today, the place has been renamed Mayiladuthurai and is part of the Mayiladuthurai District in Tamil Nadu. An only child, Pillai, ran away from home at the age of 19. Pillai boarded a ship that was bound for Singapore from the Nagapatinam port, which is along the Bay of Bengal. In 1905, he reached Tanjong Pagar, with nothing more than his clothes and 13 rupees on hand. As it was his first time in a foreign country with no familiar faces around, he was lost and ended up walking for eight hours until he reached Potong Pasir. There, an Indian family took sympathy on him and provided him shelter with a daily meal.

Pillai faced many difficulties in acquiring a job to sustain his life in Singapore. This was until the owner of a provision store at 50 Serangoon Road took him in. Eventually, this will be the location in which Pillai opens up his first PGP store. In the early days, Pillai worked as a clerk and coolie which required him to start his day at 5 am and end at 11 pm. He also worked for no wages. Instead, his employer provided him with accommodation and meals. However, it was at that provision store where Pillai learned and gained his prowess in business. In the 1920s, he met his lifelong partner, Pakiriammal who was 15 years old at that time and got married. Together, they had seven children. Three boys, Ramachandran, Ramakrishnan, and Dhanabalan, and four girls, Dhanalakshmi, Rukumani, Pushpa, and Shanbagavalli. While six out of the seven children were born in Singapore, one of them was born in India when Pillai and his family were when World War II happened.

Among his employees and his family, Pillai was known for his caution with money. He never ate in excess and only ever ate at home, a practice that he tried to inculcate with the rest of his family. However, he made sure his employees were fed well. On occasions, he would dine together with them. In this regard, frugality, diligence, and compassion were traits he shared with other pioneers of Singapore.

== Death and legacy ==
On 21 July 1980, Pillai suffered a fatal heart attack.

The Indian High Commissioner to Singapore B.M. Oza, Singapore's Ambassador to Washington Punch Coormaraswamy and the deputy managing director of the Monetary Authority of Singapore Herman Hochstadt were among the notable members of society who paid their last respects to him.

Singapore Post issued stamps portraying Pillai on 28 February 2001 to commemorate his contributions to the Indian community and Singapore. He was also featured as one of the stories under Singapore's early pioneers in the Singapore Bicentennial in 2019.
