= 1948 Rural West by-election =

| 16 October 1948 |
- Registered: 4,279
- Turnout: 72.94% (▼0.46pp)
| Candidate | Balwant Singh Bajaj | Cheong Hock Chye | Maganlal Gangaram |
| Party | Independent | PP | Independent |
| Popular vote | 1,638 | 705 | 606 |
| Percentage | 55.54% | 23.91% | 20.55% |
Councilor before election
Srish Chandra Goho
Independent
Elected Councilor
Balwant Singh Bajaj
Independent

The 1948 Rural West by-election for the Legislative Council of Singapore was held on 16 October 1948, after the death of incumbent Srish Chandra Goho on 24 July 1948. Independent candidate Balwant Singh Bajaj was elected with 56% of the vote, taking his seat on 19 October 1948.

== Background ==
In the 1948 general elections held in March, Srish Chandra Goho was elected in the Rural West constituency. However he died on 24 July.

A writ for a by-election was issued on 12 August and nominations were required by 3 September.

== Campaign ==
Progressive Party candidate Cheong Hock Chye, who ran as an independent in the Rural East constituency in the March general elections, faced two independents, one of whom had presented his nomination at the last minute.

== Results ==
| Candidate | Party | Votes | % |
|---|---|---|---|
| Balwant Singh Bajaj | Independent | 1,638 | 55.54 |
| Cheong Hock Chye | Progressive Party | 705 | 23.91 |
| Gangaram Maganlal | Independent | 606 | 20.55 |
| Total | | 2,949 | 100.00 |
| Valid votes | | 2,949 | 94.49 |
| Invalid/blank votes | | 172 | 5.51 |
| Total votes | | 3,121 | 100.00 |
| Registered voters/turnout | | 4,279 | 72.94 |
| Majority | | 933 | 31.64 |
| Independent hold | | | |
Source: Singapore Elections
