= Punch Coomaraswamy =

Singaporean judge (1925–1999)

- பஞ்ச் குமாரசுவாமி
- Official portrait, 1966

Judge of the Supreme Court of Singapore
- In office 7 September 1984 – 15 October 1993

Singapore Ambassador to the United States
- In office October 1976 – August 1984
- President: Benjamin Sheares; Devan Nair
- Preceded by: Ernest Steven Monteiro
- Succeeded by: Tommy Koh

Acting President of Singapore
- In office 5 March 1968 – 5 May 1968
- Prime Minister: Lee Kuan Yew
- Preceded by: Yusof Ishak
- Succeeded by: Yusof Ishak

2nd Speaker of the Parliament of Singapore
- In office 1966–1970
- Deputy: Yeoh Ghim Seng
- Preceded by: A. P. Rajah
- Succeeded by: Yeoh Ghim Seng

Deputy Speaker of the Parliament of Singapore
- In office February 1966 – August 1966
- Preceded by: Fong Kim Heng
- Succeeded by: Yeoh Ghim Seng

Personal details
- Born: Punchardsheram Coomaraswamy; 16 October 1925 Segamat, Johor, Unfederated Malay States
- Died: 8 January 1999 (aged 73) Singapore
- Cause of death: Chronic obstructive pulmonary disease
- Spouse: Kailanayaky Appachy
- Children: 3
- Education: University of Nottingham
- Profession: Judge; diplomat; politician

Punchardsheram "Punch" Coomaraswamy (Note: Tamil: பஞ்சாட்சரம் குமாரசுவாமி, romanized: Pañcāṭcaram Kumāracuvāmi) (16 October 1925 – 8 January 1999) was a Singaporean judge, diplomat and politician who served as Speaker of the Parliament of Singapore between 1966 and 1970, and Singapore Ambassador to the United States between 1976 and 1984.

He had also served as Singapore's Ambassador to Australia, Bangladesh, Brazil, Fiji, India, and Sri Lanka.

== Education ==
Punchardsheram Coomaraswamy was born on 16 October 1925 as the son of Kandiah and Chellam Coomaraswamy. Kandiah Coomaraswamy was a medical doctor who served in the then Straits Settlements Medical Service from 1916 to 1955, when he retired. Coomaraswamy received his early education at the English College in Johor and later obtained his law degree from the University of Nottingham in England.

== Career ==
Coomaraswamy practised in the firm of Braddell Brothers as an advocate during the 1950s and 1960s. From 1958 to 1960, he was appointed the Honorary Secretary of Singapore Bar Council. He was a visiting lecturer in the law of evidence at the University of Singapore (now National University of Singapore) from 1959 to 1969. From 1961 to 1969, he was a lecturer for the Board of Legal Education, Singapore. During his time as a lawyer, Coomaraswamy represented convicted murderer Sunny Ang in his trial, where Ang was accused of murdering his girlfriend for her insurance. Ang was executed in 1967.

In February 1966, he was appointed the Deputy Speaker of Parliament and in August of the same year, he was appointed the Speaker of Parliament. He was the Acting President of Singapore from 5 March to 5 May 1968. Dr Yeoh Ghim Seng took over as the Speaker of the Parliament in January 1970.

His first appointment with the Ministry of Foreign Affairs was from January 1970 to July 1973 as Singapore's High Commissioner to India, Sri Lanka, Nepal and Bangladesh. From July 1973 to September 1976, he was Singapore's High Commissioner to Australia and Fiji, and from October 1976 to August 1984, he was Singapore's Ambassador to the United States and Brazil.

He served as a Supreme Court judge from 7 September 1984 to 15 October 1993.

=== High profile cases ===
One of the cases presided by Coomaraswamy as a judge was the 1987 case of Teo Boon Ann, a 26-year-old temple medium charged with killing 66-year-old Chong Kin Meng during a failed robbery attempt. Together with then Judicial Commissioner Chan Sek Keong, Coomaraswamy rejected Teo's claims of killing the victim in self-defense, and instead, they found that Teo had intentionally and cruelly killed Chong to avoid leaving her alive as a witness to identify him. As such, both Chan and Coomaraswamy found Teo guilty of murder and sentenced him to death.

Another was the case of Nyu Kok Meng, a Malaysian armed robber who was an accomplice of Sek Kim Wah, a serial killer who roped Nyu in to commit robbery at an Andrew Road bungalow before he killed three out of the five hostages. Nyu did not take part in the killings and instead, he protected the remaining two hostages from Sek's murderous rampage. Coomaraswamy, who found Nyu guilty of committing armed robbery with a rifle, took into consideration that Nyu never harmed the victims and willingly gave himself up to the police, and thus he erred on the side of leniency and sentenced Nyu to the minimum sentence of life imprisonment and the mandatory minimum of six strokes of the cane.

Coomaraswamy was also the trial judge of the 1988 Lee Chee Poh case. The case was about Lee, a 50-year-old widow, masterminding the 1984 murder of her 39-year-old husband Frankie Tan, who was often abusive to Lee and even brought a mistress home after having multiple affairs, and fathered a son with the woman. In sentencing Lee to seven years' imprisonment for a reduced charge of manslaughter, Coomaraswamy took into consideration Lee's regret for the crime and also expressed his deep sympathy for Lee over the emotional abuse caused by her husband's treachery, which drove her to ask her brother-in-law and three others to kill Tan, whom Coomaraswamy condemned as a "callous" person for bringing his pregnant lover home and abused his wife Lee in cold blood.

In 1990, Coomaraswamy was one of the two judges presiding the trial of Chia Chee Yeen, a National Serviceman who was charged with the fatal shooting of his army superior Daniel De Rozario in 1987. Coomaraswamy and another trial judge Chao Hick Tin (who was then Judicial Commissioner) rejected Chia's defence of diminished responsibility, finding that Chia never suffered from an abnormality of the mind and he was often described as an average soldier who performed his line of duty with a satisfactory performance, and Chia had killed De Rozario for being punished over a violation of rules in the army camp and he took it too far over a trivial issue. Chia was therefore found guilty of murder and sentenced to death.

In November 1992, Coomaraswamy heard the 1990 case of Sivapragasam Subramaniam, a 20-year-old Malaysian and machine operator who was killed by the Ang Soon Tong while they were waging a gang clash with their rival gang Gi Leng Hor; Sivapragasam was not a member of any gang. Eleven of the fourteen members involved in the killing stood trial before Coomaraswamy for the charges of rioting and inflicting grievous hurt. Coomaraswamy sentenced these 11 youths, aged between 17 and 22, to jail terms ranging between 31 months and five years, and six of them were ordered to receive caning between three and eight strokes, stating that the death of an innocent bystander during the gang conflict was deplorable and tragic, and it was no less tragic for youths who joined gangs and bear the tragic consequences of going to jail at a young age for crimes committed as a gang member. As for the remaining three gang members, they were separately tried for the case and unrelated offences: one of them, the Ang Soon Tong headman Sagar Suppiah Retnam was sentenced to death for murdering Sivapragasam, while another was given 17 strokes of the cane and seven years' jail for causing grievous hurt to Sivapragasam, and a third named Soosay Sinnappen was jailed nine years for an unrelated case of manslaughter and another sentence of four years with six strokes of the cane for causing serious hurt to Sivapragasam.

On 16 July 1993, three months before his tenure as a judge would end, Coomaraswamy sentenced a 32-year-old delivery worker named Bala Kuppusamy to 23 years' imprisonment and 24 strokes of the cane for robbing, sodomizing and raping a 20-year-old student in October 1992, in addition to similar crimes perpetuated against three other females (one of whom was 13 years old). In fact, Bala was previously convicted of rape in 1985 and was released on parole after serving seven years out of his 11-year jail term, and his crimes took place merely 45 days after he was out of prison. Coomaraswamy admonished Bala for not learning his lesson from his first stint in prison, which ended just seven weeks before Bala committed these second string of offences against four innocent females, and he added that Bala deserved no sympathy. Bala was granted parole and released in March 2008 after spending 15 years in prison, but he re-offended and attacked seven women, robbing them and even raped or molested about three or four of the victims. He was therefore arrested and sentenced to jail for 42 years and given 24 strokes of the cane.

== Family and death ==
Coomaraswamy married Kaila on 9 November 1956 and had three children from the marriage. He died in his sleep on 8 January 1999 as a result of chronic lung disease caused by smoking. One of his sons, Vinodh Coomaraswamy, is currently a judge in the High Court of Singapore.

== Awards ==
- 1946: Pacific War (1941 to 1945) Medal (United Kingdom)
- 1976: Public Service Star Award
- 1980: Meritorious Service Medal

== Notes ==
Parliament of Singapore
Preceded by Dr Fong Kim Heng	Deputy Speaker of the Parliament of Singapore; 1966	Succeeded by Dr Yeoh Ghim Seng
Preceded by A. P. Rajah	Speaker of the Parliament of Singapore; 1966-1968	Succeeded by Dr Yeoh Ghim Seng
Political offices
Preceded by Yusof Ishak as President of Singapore	President of Singapore (Acting); 1968	Succeeded by Yusof Ishak as President of Singapore
Diplomatic posts
Preceded by Ernest Steven Monteiro	Ambassador of Singapore to the United States; 1976-1984	Succeeded by Prof. Tommy Koh
