= Tamil Methodist Church =

Church in Melaka City, Melaka, Malaysia

Coordinates: 2°11′54.2″N 102°14′40.9″E

Tamil Methodist Church Melaka
- Malay: Gereja Tamil Methodist
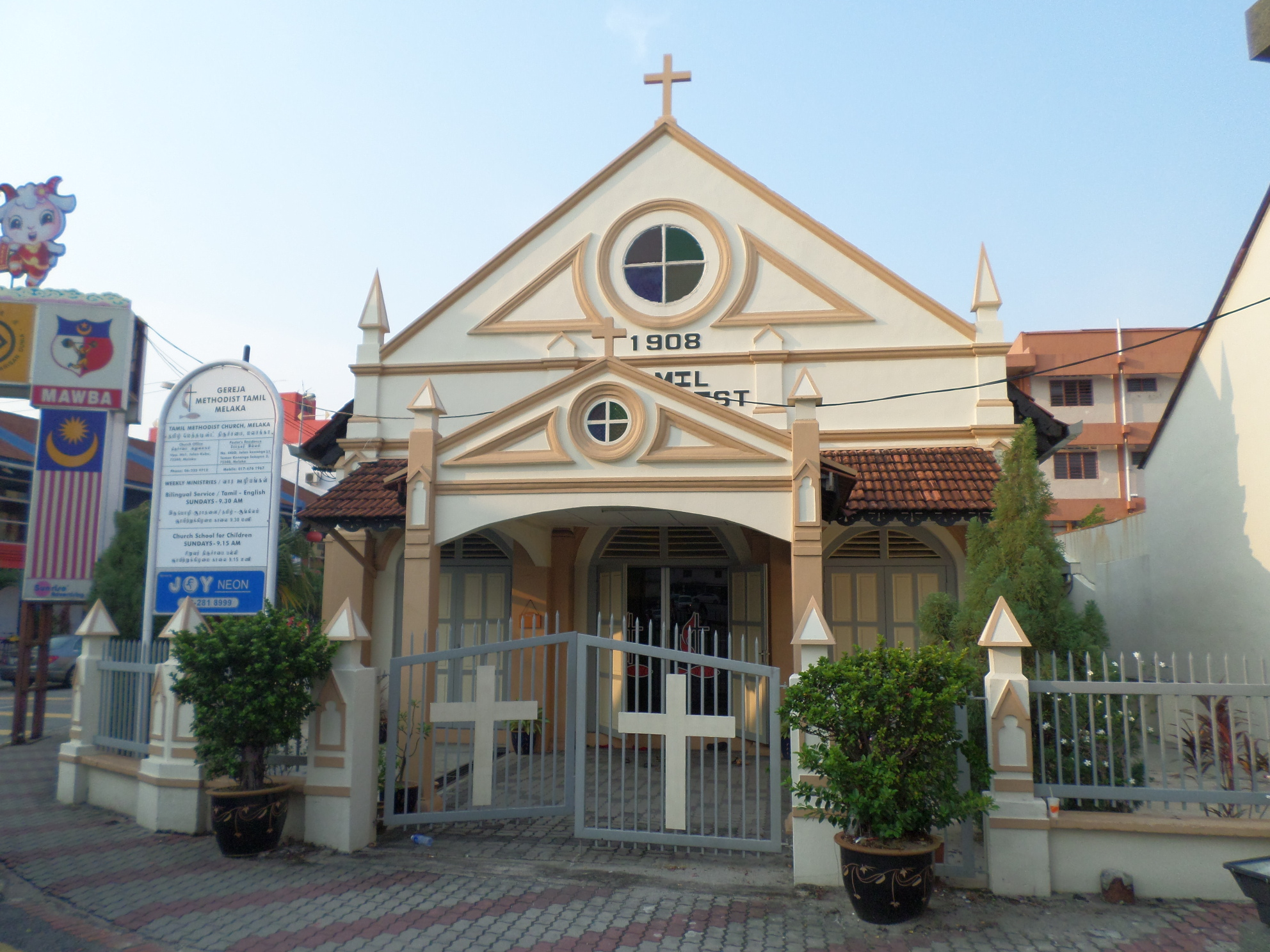

Religion
- Affiliation: Methodism

Location
- Location: Melaka City, Melaka, Malaysia
- Interactive map of Tamil Methodist Church Melaka

Architecture
- Type: church
- Completed: 1908; 118 years ago

The Tamil Methodist Church (Malay: Gereja Tamil Methodist) is a church in Melaka City, Melaka, Malaysia.

== History ==
The church was built in 1908 and initially known as Kubu Methodist Church. As the congregation grew bigger, space became an issue. In 1954, the Peranakans and English-speaking expatriates built a new church at Tengkera Street. In 1955, Mandarin-speaking Methodist moved to their own church at Tan Chay Yan Street, leaving the church to become the spiritual home for Tamil and English-speaking congregation.

== See also ==
- List of tourist attractions in Melaka
- Christianity in Malaysia
