= S. C. Goho =

Singaporean lawyer and politician (1891–1948)

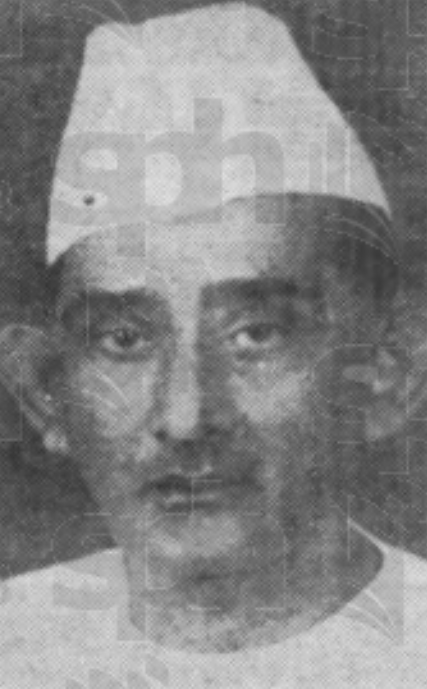
Goho in 1948

Shrish Chandra Goho (1891 – 24 July 1948) was a prominent lawyer and politician in Singapore. He was a member of the Legislative Council of Singapore.

== Early life ==
Goho was born in Calcutta in 1891.

== Career ==
Goho came to Singapore in 1918. He served on the Johore Bar Committee. In 1935, he began to participate in local politics. He served as the vice-president of the Central Indian Association. As the vice-president, he criticised a strike consisting of over 20,000 labourers from the Federated Malay States. He aided in the strike's resolving. He was re-elected the association's president in late 1940. He also served as the president of the Indian Youth League. In June 1941, he was elected the president of the Singapore Indian Association in place of community leader V. Pakirisamy, who had resigned from the position. From 1941 to 1942, Goho aided in the evacuation of Indians from Malaya by securing several ships that would travel to India. Despite being responsible for the evacuation of thousands from Malaya, he himself chose to remain in Singapore. For his actions leading up to the Fall of Singapore, he was made an Agent of the Government of India, and was praised by Sir Shenton Thomas, the Governor of the Straits Settlements, in a message sent to New Delhi, India. He also established the Indian Passive Defence.

During the Japanese Occupation of Singapore, he was appointed the president of the local branch of the Indian Independence League. In secret, he spent over $242,000 to help prisoners of war at the Nee Soon prison hospital with the aid of the hospital's commanding officer. His efforts prevented the starvation of many prisoners at the hospital. Following the end of the Japanese Occupation, Goho was detained by the British for being a suspected collaborator with the Japanese. In October 1945, J. C. Cobbett of the Special Court announced that he had sufficient evidence to charge Goho under the Sedition Ordinance of 1938 and the War Offence Ordinance of 1941, with the latter charge resulting in him being denied bail. In January 1946, it was announced that the preliminary inquiry into the allegations of Japanese collaboration against him, which was scheduled to have been held on 24 January, had been postponed. The preliminary inquiry was then rescheduled to have begun on 19 February. However, Goho was granted bail on 11 February, with his case being adjourned sine die, after his prosecutor received orders "not to proceed." He was officially acquitted of all charges on 23 March. The charges against Eurasian community leader Charles Joseph Pemberton Paglar and journalist Abdul Samad bin Haji Ismail were also withdrawn on the same day.

Despite having many supporters in the Serangoon-Katong Area, Goho decided to contest the Rural West Constituency seat of the Legislative Council of Singapore as an Independent in the 1948 Singaporean general election as he wished to prevent "sectarianism, communalism and provincialism" in the elections. The Malayan Democratic Union then complained on behalf of Pusat Tenaga Ra'ayat and the All-Malaya Council of Joint Action to then Prime Minister of India Jawaharlal Nehru on the conduct of the seven candidates of the 1948 election who were Indian nationals, including Goho, Malathi Pillai, Mohamed Javad Namazie, M. K. Chidambaram, V. P. Abdullah, M. A. Majid and Nazir Ahmad Mallal, accusing them of "opportunism and personal aggrandisement". He won the election with 50.03 per cent of the votes.

== Personal life and death ==
Goho was married to Saroja Goho, who served as the president of the Lotus Club, a precursor to the Kamala Club. On 12 July 1948, he left Singapore for Calcutta on sick leave. He died there on 24 July. He received a "glowing" obituary in the Malayan Law Journal.
