= Shirin Fozdar =

Indian women's rights activist

- Born: 1905; Mumbai, Bombay Presidency, British India
- Died: 1992 (aged 86–87)
- Occupation: Women's rights activist
- Organization: Singapore Council of Women
- Honours: Inducted into the Singapore Women's Hall of Fame

Shirin Fozdar (1905–1992) was a women's rights activist. Born in India, she worked on women's rights and welfare issues in her native country in the 1930s and 1940s. In 1950 she and her husband moved to Singapore to help spread the Baháʼí Faith. In Singapore, she became a champion against marriage inequality and polygamy; she was instrumental in the founding of the Singapore Council of Women and of the nation's Syariah Court, and was a leader in the advocacy effort that saw the Women's Charter become law.

Following the death of her husband in 1958 and the passage of the Women's Charter in 1961, she moved to Thailand for 14 years, during which time she established a school for girls at risk of being forced into prostitution.

== Early life ==
Shirin Fozdar was born in Mumbai (then known as Bombay), India in 1905. Her parents, Mehraban Khodabux Behjat and Dowlat, were Irani practitioners of the Baháʼí Faith that had converted from Zoroastrianism. One of the teachings of the Baháʼí religion is that men and women are equal, and at the age of 17, she gave a presentation on universal education at the Baha'is of India National Convention in Karachi. By the 1930s she was involved in the All-Asian Women's Conference, which sent her to give a presentation on equality at a League of Nations conference in Geneva in 1934. She continued to give public speeches, and in 1941 gave a speech on peace in Ahmedabad at the behest of Mahatma Gandhi.

== Singapore ==
In 1950, Fozdar moved to Singapore with her husband, Khodadad Fozdar, seeking to spread the Baháʼí teachings. Her husband was a physician also of Zoroastrian descent, who was described as the first Indian Zoroastrian to have converted to the Baháʼí' religion. In 1952, Fozdar co-founded the Singapore Council of Women (SCW) along with other activists representing existing women's organizations. Fozdar was one of the leaders in pushing for the meeting that led to the establishment of the SCW, and in that initial meeting helped shape the group's vision and agenda. She was elected to serve as the group's honorary general secretary, sending its early communications to the media and politicians. The group was the first women's political action organization, and with over 2,000 members, was the largest such group for five decades.

One of the issues that attracted Fozdar's immediate attention was marriage inequality; the laws governing marriage and divorce gave the husband the power to easily divorce and remarry, and left the wife with little recourse. In an interview, Fozdar explained that "When I first came here, the rates of polygamy and easy divorce were alarming. Marriage laws were lax. Women suffered all kinds of atrocities because men held the belief that women were the weaker sex." Fozdar and the SWC campaigned intensely for a solution, and in 1955 a Syariah Court was set up to address the issue. The court had jurisdiction over marriage and divorce, could order husbands to pay alimony, and before polygamy was outlawed, could force a husband to secure his first wife's consent before marrying a second wife. The book Our Lives to Live: Putting a Woman's Face to Change in Singapore credits Fozdar, Che Zahara binte Noor Mohamed, and Khatijun Nissa Siraj as the main forces behind the court's formation.

During the 1950s, the Fozdar and the Singapore Council of Women had an inconsistent working relationship with the People's Action Party (PAP), which was founded in 1954 on the platform of Singaporean independence from Britain. The SWC hoped to get the PAP to make women's equality issues, especially the abolition of polygamy, a core part of their agenda. The PAP was at times strongly receptive, and in 1956 gave Fozdar an opportunity to speak on the issue of polygamy at a Women's Day rally organized by the party. However, by 1957 the SWC was so frustrated with the PAP's inaction on women's equality issues that it urged SWC members to run as independent candidates, rather than as PAP candidates, in that year's City Council elections. The PAP was the only party to eventually put women's rights and anti-polygamy language in their charter, though, doing so in their 1959 election manifesto. The PAP swept that year's elections, in significant part because due to support from women voters. Fozdar moved quickly, urging the party to pass a women's rights bill first proposed in 1954. The legislature took the issue up in 1960, using the 1954 proposal as a framework, and in 1961 the Women's Charter became law. The bill outlawed polygamy, provided women with legal recourse against husbands that conducted adultery or bigamy, and contained a number of other provisions that protected women and girls. According to the Singapore Women's Hall of Fame, which inducted Fozdar in 2014, her activism was instrumental in the Charter's passage.

== Later life ==
Fozdar's husband died in 1958, and in 1961 Fozdar moved to rural Thailand where she set up a school for girls, with the aim of empowering women against being forced into prostitution. She spent 14 years in the country before returning to Singapore. She traveled internationally, continuing to give speeches on women's rights issues as well as on the Baháʼí Faith.

Shirin Fozdar died of cancer on 2 February 1992. She had three sons and two daughters. The eldest daughter Muneera Fozdar, a lawyer married Sir Chinubhai Madhowlal Ranchhodlal, 3rd Baronet of Shahpur.
