= Women's Charter =

Statute of the Parliament of Singapore

Women's Charter 1961

Legislative Assembly of Singapore
- Long title: An Act to provide for monogamous marriages and for the solemnisation and registration of such marriages; to amend and consolidate the law relating to divorce, the rights and duties of married persons, the protection of family, the maintenance of wives and children and the punishment of offences against women and girls; and to provide for matters incidental thereto.
- Citation: Ordinance No. 18 of 1961
- Enacted by: Legislative Assembly of Singapore
- Commenced: 15 September 1961

Legislative history
- Bill title: Women's Charter Bill
- Bill citation: Bill No. 126/61
- Introduced: 3 March 1961
- First reading: 22 February 1961
- Second reading: 22 March 1961
- Third reading: 24 May 1961
- Committee report: Select Committee on the Women's Charter Bill [L.A. 10 of 1961] (1961), Official Report, Singapore: Government Printer
- Status: In force

The Women's Charter 1961 is an Act of the Singaporean Parliament passed in 1961. The Act was designed to improve and protect the rights of women in Singapore and to guarantee greater legal equality for women in legally sanctioned relationships (except in the area of Muslim marriages, which are governed separately by the Administration of Muslim Law Act). Among other things, the Act provides for the institution of monogamous marriages, the rights of husbands and wives in marriage, the protection of the family, and the legal potentialities with regard to divorce and separation.

== Overview ==
The Women's Charter was successfully campaigned for by Madam Chan Choy Siong, wife of Ong Pang Boon, a former Cabinet Minister of Singapore.

The Women's Charter was largely based on existing legislation. Parts III to X in the main re-enacted the Civil Marriage Ordinance, the Married Women's Property Ordinance, the Married Women and Children (Maintenance) Ordinance, the Maintenance (Facilities for Enforcement) Ordinance, the Divorce Ordinance and the Women and Girls Protection Ordinance. Part II, which "seeks to provide that any person who is already lawfully married under any law, religion, custom or usage shall during the continuance of such marriage be incapable of contracting any further marriage", was largely new.

Since 1997, divorcing couples have had to file a parenting plan that includes arrangements on custody, access to the child, and provisions for the child's education needs.

Latest amendments to the Charter were passed firstly in January 2011 that introduced provisions to facilitate marriages in Singapore, address divorce and its impact and strengthen the enforcement of maintenance orders. Amendments were passed again on 29 February 2016 after being proposed by the Ministry of Social and Family Development:

- Beginning 1 October 2016, the mandatory Marriage Preparation Programme is extended to all marriages in which at least one party is below the age of 21.
- By end 2016, a two-hour mandatory parenting counselling is necessitated for divorcing parents with at least one child younger than 14 yet disagree on divorce matters. This regulation may eventually be extended to include divorcing parents with at least one child younger than 21.
- Men can now apply for maintenance but unlike women, they can seek maintenance only if they are incapacitated, i.e. unable to support themselves whether due to illness or disability. Previously, only women could apply for alimony from their former spouse in Singapore whereas men could not.
- Maintenance record officers that can get information on divorcing parties' finances are introduced in helping the courts identify recalcitrant defaulters of and impose harsher penalties against them. This takes aim at these defaulters by reducing the burden of proof of women to show their husbands' or former husbands' finances.
- Beginning March 2016, after divorce, parents who have children under 21 and agree on all divorce matters must attend a two-hour programme on issues such as co-parenting and self-care skills.
- Greater protection for those affected by family violence, as well as the staff of homes and shelters. In the case of an ugly divorce, by end 2016 a judge can summon a counsellor presence in supervising meet ups between a child and the parent without custody.
- Voiding of marriages of convenience as defined under the Immigration Act.

== Uses and Concerns ==
Around one in five marriages on the island ends in divorce. Court figures also show that there were 6,017 divorce cases in 2014, a 45 per cent rise from 2000. Custody battles are also of significant concern in recent times. In 2013, there were 1,700 court applications for enforcement orders compelling former spouses to maintain their ex-partners and children. This compares to 1,900 in 2009, before harsher penalties were introduced in 2011. By April 2014, there was an average of 118 orders each year for employers to directly pay out maintenance from defaulters' salaries.

In December 2015, the Association of Women for Action and Research made a proposition that the Women's Charter be renamed as Family Charter instead. Critics also regard the Charter as having transformed from being a safeguard for disadvantaged women into a method of discriminating against men.
