= Singapore Indian Association =

Indian organisation in Singapore

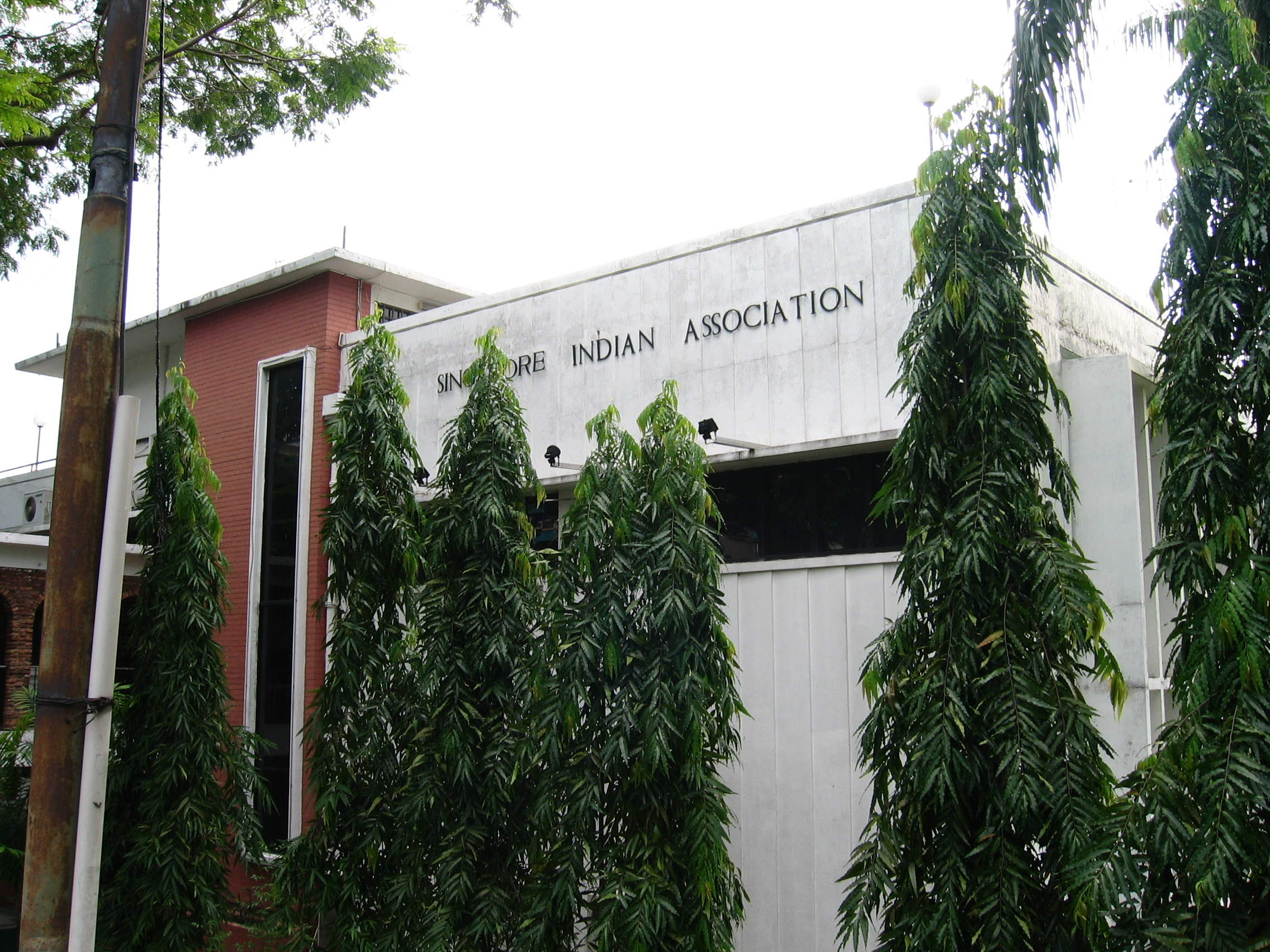
Indian Association building in Singapore.

The Singapore Indian Association was established in 1923 with the objective of promoting the social, physical, intellectual, cultural and the general welfare of its members. When it was formed, the association projected itself as a pan-Indian, rather than narrowly ethnic, language, religion, caste or region-based organization. This marked it as significantly different from most other Indian organisations in Singapore.

The association led by the Indian mercantile and professional elite, expanding its membership to include the emerging white collar middle classes as well. Initially, the leaders of the association were seized with the political spirit of the time in both India and Singapore. Many were supporters of the Indian independence movement, and many were also concerned about the social welfare and political rights of the wider Indian community in Singapore and British Malaya, which the city-state was then a part of.

The Singapore Indian Association was one of a number of such associations located in towns and cities all across Malaya. With the development of the Merdeka or freedom movement in Malayan politics, these associations became nodal points for the activation of Indian political activism. In time, this contributed to the formation of the Malaysian Indian Congress, the main political party in Malaysia representing the Indian community, and a current member of Malaysia’s ruling Barisan Nasional coalition government.

Singapore politics, however, followed a different path. While Singapore’s ruling People’s Action Party (PAP) initially sought to merge with Malaya in a political federation, this eventual union proved to be unviable, resulting in the ejection of Singapore from Malaysia in 1965, when the former became and independent republic. However, even prior to this momentous event, Singapore politics had developed along different lines from the rest of Malaysia. With its different racial makeup, the racial politics of Malaysia did not fit in well with Singapore’s demographic realities. In Singapore, voters, including Indians and other minorities, tended to support non race-based political parties like the PAP. With the eventual separation of Singapore from Malaysia, and the later consolidation of PAP hegemony over Singapore via a quasi-authoritarian government, the Singapore Indian Association quickly lost its political role and became a social, sports and recreation club.

While the association was founded in 1923, its clubhouse was only completed in the 1950s. It is located at the historic Balestier Plain in Singapore, which has acquired formal heritage status for its concentration of a cluster of community associations and sports clubs, such as the Indian Association. In keeping with its early political leanings, the foundation stone of the clubhouse was laid by Jawaharlal Nehru on 18 June 1950.

Since its beginning, the association has been extremely active in Singapore’s sports scene. Sports in which the association is active in include cricket, tennis, hockey, football and billiards. Many of its members and sportspeople also went on to represent Singapore in regional and international tournaments.

Over time, the association began to decline in terms of its membership, finances and public profile. However, with a fresh influx of leadership in the late 1990s, its fortunes have improved to some extent. The association’s website reports a membership of about 1,000 members today. Recently, the association has published a book – Passage of Indians - to commemorate its history, as well as that of the Indian community in Singapore.
