= Crocodile farming in Singapore =

Crocodile farming in Singapore is a specialized agricultural industry dedicated to the breeding and raising of crocodiles for the commercial production of both crocodile meat and leather.

The majority of crocodile species farmed in Singapore since the 1940s have primarily included Crocodylus porosus, along with Crocodylus novaeguinae, Caiman crocodilus, and Tomistoma schlegelii, with Crocodylus porosus being the most prevalent. Singapore has served as a hub for exporting crocodile meat and operates tanneries that process crocodile skins for the leather industry. Although crocodile farming was once a highly profitable industry for many farms in Singapore, only one remains today. As of 2023, Long Kuan Hung Crocodile Farm is the sole surviving crocodile farm in the country, housing more than 13,000 crocodiles.

== History ==
=== Early colonial influence ===
There is no evidence of commercial crocodile use in Singapore during the 19th century. The first proposal for such a venture came in 1924 when David George Stead, the Fisheries Enquiry Commissioner of British Malaya, suggested that Singapore could serve as a hub for the surrounding islands in the development of a crocodile leather industry. Stead proposed this as a subsidiary industry to complement the existing fisheries in Malaya, highlighting its potential for economic expansion.

In the 1930s, the commercial potential of crocodile leather gained attention following David George Stead’s earlier proposals. Lancelot Ambrose Scudamore Jermyn, a member of the Malayan Educational Service, strongly advocated for hunting and utilizing crocodiles. Jermyn conducted early experiments in crocodile leather production, eventually achieving success after numerous failed attempts. Jermyn even encouraged the establishment of crocodile farms, suggesting that locals living along river mouths construct enclosures for baby crocodiles. Crocodile hunting for sustenance continued in rural areas, as noted by local accounts from villagers, further indicating the unrecorded use of wild crocodiles.

=== Rise of crocodile farming in post-war Singapore ===
Crocodile farming only began to thrive after World War II, as Singapore rose to prominence as a major hub for the crocodile skin trade. By 1948, many shops in Singapore sold and kept crocodiles, pythons, and lizards for commercial purposes. Most of the crocodiles were sourced from Johore and Sumatra, where they were raised until large enough to be skinned and made into leather goods. Crocodile skin shoes, for instance, were sold for $40 a pair.

A notable example of a pioneering crocodile farm is the Tan Moh Hong Reptile Skin and Singapore Crocodile Farm, established in 1945 by Tan Gua Chua. Situated on Upper Serangoon Road, the farm began modestly with just 10 crocodiles in Tan's backyard but soon expanded into a 90,000 square-foot facility near Serangoon Garden Estate. Originally created to share Tan's passion for crocodiles, the farm also supplied skins to his tannery, which produced items such as shoes, wallets, belts, and handbags. The rising global demand for reptile skins in high fashion markets, combined with the scarcity of crocodiles in Malaysia due to the high price of crocodile meat, helped position Singapore as a thriving hub for the reptile skin industry.

=== Establishing a crocodile supply chain in Singapore ===
In 1964, then-Minister of Finance, Goh Keng Swee together with the Economic Development Board of Singapore, announced plans to establish a modern leather tannery in Singapore which aimed to capitalise on the global demand for reptile and crocodile skins. At this time, Singapore's crocodile export industry, primarily based on locally bred crocodiles, was estimated to be worth over three million dollars.

By the 1970s, crocodile farms had proliferated throughout Singapore, appearing in agriculture plots such as Punggol, Yio Chu Kang, and Chua Chu Kang. Surveys showed that there were many small-time farmers who kept their crocodiles in back-yard enclosures until the reptiles are of age to be killed. A study conducted in 1977 identified over 92 farms in Singapore that were raising crocodiles, with only 5 dedicated exclusively to the crocodile trade. The remaining 87 farms cited purely economic reasons for keeping crocodiles, viewing them as a lucrative sideline to their poultry operations.

An international trade study reported that total exports of crocodile skins peaked in 1980, with Singapore exporting 92,461 kg of skin. Despite the boom in the import and export of crocodile skins, Singapore was not a party to CITES, a multilateral treaty that protects endangered plants and animals from the threats of international trade.

=== Pivoting to tourism ===
Crocodiles and their leather products played a significant role in Singapore's economy from the late 1960s, contributing to the country's tourism industry and the demand for exotic goods as Singapore sought to rebrand itself as a tourist destination. Crocodile leather handbags and clothing became popular items sold to tourists, with Raffles Place Garden featuring them as early as 1965. By 1971, when Commonwealth delegates visited Singapore, their wives were taken to a crocodile farm and tanning facility, which was highlighted as a key part of the tour.

Farms like Tan Moh Hong Reptile Skin and Singapore Crocodile Farm slowly transformed into popular tourist attractions, featuring live crocodiles imported from Indonesia and Cambodia. Visitors could observe the animals in large pools, tour a factory where raw crocodile skins were tanned and processed, and purchase crocodile skin products on-site. High influx of tourism to Singapore attracted major players to develop crocodile farms as tourist attractions. Notably, the Singapore Crocodilarium, which opened in 1981, emerged as one of the country's key nature-based destinations. In 1988, Jurong Town Corporation (JTC) announced plans to open Jurong Crocodile Paradise, a park designed to house over 2,500 crocodiles in recreated natural habitats. The $10 million park project aimed to provide both entertainment and education, featuring an amusement center, tanning workshops, and a 200-seat auditorium for visitors.

Ecotourism in Singapore, supported by government initiatives, focuses on promoting eco-friendly attractions and preserving natural landscapes. Despite its small size and high urbanization, the Singapore Tourism Board (STB) had actively developed and marketed these such attractions as part of its broader strategy to position Singapore as a green destination. Through initiatives like "Island Escapades," "Rustic Charm," and "Nature Trail," Singapore incorporated nature into its tourism offerings for both mass tourists and niche ecotourism groups. Crocodile-themed attractions and farms attract only 10% of the total visitor rate compared to other nature-based attractions, such as the Singapore Zoo and Singapore Botanic Gardens. All crocodile themed attractions have ceased operations in Singapore.

=== Decline of crocodile farms in Singapore ===
Singapore faced scrutiny for allegedly facilitating wildlife trade due to its role as a regional commerce hub. The World Wildlife Fund stated that crocodile skins were taken illegally from their country of origin and shipped to Singapore and re-exported to European and US markets. In response, the Convention on International Trade in Endangered Species (CITES) was implemented in Singapore on 9 February 1987. The treaty aimed to ensure that international trade of animals listed under its protection would not threaten their survival in the wild, with the trade of crocodiles to and from Singapore falling under these regulations.

With the implementation of the treaty, all trade in endangered wildlife and raw materials became regulated by the Primary Production Department of Singapore, which assumed responsibility for overseeing and controlling such transactions. Crocodiles and their skins brought to Singapore were typically sourced from wild-caught animals and re-exported to other countries. However, many businesses faced challenges once the treaty was implemented, as they could no longer import crocodiles listed under its protection. In the early years of Singapore's crocodile industry, many animals were brought in with falsified papers, which led to difficulties as stricter regulations took effect.

== Crocodile farms and tanneries in Singapore in the 2000s ==
=== Tanneries ===
In the early 2000s, Singapore emerged as a key hub for trade and processing, housing one of the largest tanneries in the world. The majority of crocodile skins imported were re-exported to other countries for final production or manufacturing. This industry has sustained its profitability for several decades. In 2011, French multinational luxury goods conglomerate, LVMH, announced the acquisition of crocodile leather supplier Heng Long, purchasing a 51% stake in the company, which was valued at 92 million euros at the time of the transaction.

Singapore was the third largest player in the world for the export and import of crocodile skins in 2000. By 2018, Singapore became the largest importer of reptile skins from Africa, accounting for 60% of all reptile skins exported from Africa to Asia. This totaled 933,583 skins out of 1.6 million, primarily consisting of Nile crocodiles.

=== Farms ===
As of 2023, Long Kuan Hung Crocodile Farm is the last remaining crocodile farm in Singapore. Established in 1977, the farm houses over 14,000 crocodiles at various life stages and was the first in Southeast Asia to receive CITES accreditation, allowing for the sale and trade of second-generation crocodiles bred on-site. The facility includes breeding ponds, pens, and an incubation room for hatchlings. Additionally, Long Kuan Hung operates an AVA-accredited crocodile slaughterhouse, enabling the farming and processing of crocodile products on-site. The farm is located in Lim Chu Kang Agrotech Park, having relocated from its original site in Seletar Hills during the 1980s. Each year, the farm produces over 3,000 saltwater crocodile hatchlings, of which a select number are retained for breeding, while the rest are slaughtered at five years old for their meat and skins, yielding approximately 1,600 skins annually.

== Bibliography ==
- Adan, R. I. Y. "Crocodile Farming: A Multi-Million Dollar Industry." SEAFDEC Asian Aquaculture 22, no. 3 (2000): 28.
- Ashley, J. Don. International Alligator and Crocodile Trade Study. Ashley Associates, Inc., 1988.
- Henderson, Joan C., Alex Koh, Sherlyn Soh, and Mohammed Yazid Sallim. "Urban Environments and Nature-based Attractions: Green Tourism in Singapore." Tourism Recreation Research 26, no. 3 (2001): 71–78.
- Luxmoore, R. A., J. G. Barzdo, S. R. Broad, and D. A. Jones. A Directory of Crocodilian Farming Operations. Cambridge: University Press, 1985. pp. 133–135. ISBN 2-88032-809-8
- Lye, Lin-Heng. "The Implementation of the Convention on International Trade in Endangered Species in Singapore." Journal of International Wildlife Law & Policy 2, no. 1 (1999): 46–63.
- Manalo, Rainier I., and Angel C. Alcala. "Status of the Crocodile (Crocodylus porosus, Schneider) Industry in the Philippines." Paper presented at the 35th Annual Scientific Meeting of the National Academy of Science and Technology, Philippines, June 2013. Philippine Journal of Science 35 (2): 346-358.
- Ngiam, Tong Tau. "Sustaining Singapore’s Farming Heritage." Lecture, CLC Urban Pioneer Lecture Series, 25 May 2016.
- Ooi, Can-Seng. "The Orient Responds: Tourism, Orientalism and the National Museums of Singapore." Tourism 53, no. 4 (December 2004): 285–299.
- Pocklington, Kate. Beast, Guardian, Island: The Saltwater Crocodile (Crocodylus porosus Schneider, 1801) in Singapore, 1819–2017. Singapore: National University of Singapore, Lee Kong Chian Natural History Museum, 2021. ISBN 978-981-18-0039-9
- Pocklington, K., and S. Perez. "Revulsion and Reverence: Crocodiles in Singapore." BiblioAsia, July–September 2018.
- Soh, Esmond Chuah Meng. “A Cultural History of Fear, Fascination, Fantasy and Crocodiles in Singapore.” In Singaporean Creatures: Histories of Humans and Other Animals in the Garden City, edited by Timothy P. Barnard, 100–125. Singapore: NUS Press, 2024.
