= Ivy Singh-Lim =

Singaporean farmer

- Born: Ivy Singh; 1949 (age 76–77); Colony of Singapore
- Other names: Ivy Singh; The Gentle Warrior
- Occupations: farmer, advocate
- Employer: Bollywood Farms
- Organization: Society for the Prevention of Cruelty to Animals Singapore
- Spouse: Lim Ho Seng (m. 1982)

Ivy Singh-Lim (born 1949) is a Singaporean farmer and former president of Netball Singapore and the Asian Federation of Netball Associations (AFNA). She is also an advocate for animals and the Society for the Prevention of Cruelty to Animals Singapore (SPCA). Singh-Lim was inducted into the Singapore Women's Hall of Fame in 2014. Singh-Lim is also known as "The Gentle Warrior."

== Biography ==
Singh was born in Singapore in 1949 into a wealthy family where her father traced his lineage to the Rajput clan. She was one of four children and the only girl in the family. Ivy Singh eventually became involved in working in her family's property business. Ivy Singh married Lim Ho Seng, a successful businessman in 1982 and was renamed as Ivy Singh-Lim. Together they raised Lim's daughter from a previous marriage.

Between 1992 and 2005, she worked as president of Netball Singapore. During her tenure, she was "widely credited with bringing new life to the sport." In 1999, Singh-Lim became the president of the Asian Federation of Netball Associations (AFNA). In 2000, she opened the Netball Singapore LifeHub. She left netball in 2006 to focus full time on her farm.

In 2000, Singh-Lim and her husband founded an organic farm, Bollywood Veggies at Lim Chu Kang area in Singapore after they both retired from their former careers. Singh-Lim has served as president of the Kranji Countryside Association, which is a union of farms in Singapore and was started in 2005. Singh-Lim emphasizes that it is important for people to have access to nature and feels that providing public access to farms helps accomplish this goal. She is also active in taking care of animals, supporting the Society for the Prevention of Cruelty to Animals Singapore (SPCA) and in 2015 owned 19 dogs. Singh-Lim and her husband live with their dogs next to the farm.

Singh-Lim was inducted into the Singapore Women's Hall of Fame in 2014.
