= Bollywood Farms =

Bollywood Farms Pte Ltd
- Interactive map of Bollywood Farms Pte Ltd
- Town/City: Lim Chu Kang
- Country: Singapore
- Coordinates: 1°25′06.6″N 103°42′59.5″E
- Established: 2000
- Owner: Ivy Singh-Lim; Lim Ho Seng
- Produces: Organic vegetables
- Status: open
- Website: bollywoodfarms.com

Bollywood Farms Pte Ltd, formerly known as Bollywood Veggies Organic Farm, is a farming collective and organic growing education center located in the Lim Chu Kang district of North West Singapore.

== Background ==
The center was launched in 2000 by Ivy Singh-Lim and her husband, former NTUC FairPrice chief executive, Lim Ho Seng, as a project to run after they had both retired from their previous careers. Neil Humphreys covered the center in his 2006 book Final Notes From a Great Island.

In 2010, Bollywood Veggies was charged with failing to have its buildings inspected by a structural engineer or hold the inspections after several requests that they do so. Singh-Lim and Lim stated that they did not own the buildings on the center's property (as they were leasing the land ) and that they had not received any prior notices about the requested inspections, to which the courts stated that they were the legal owners of the buildings. They were later cleared of the charges on 25 March 2011, after a judge ruled that it could not be proven beyond a reasonable doubt that Bollywood Veggies had received the notices.

In 2020, the land lease for Bollywood Veggies was to expire in 2021 but was extended to allow transition of the business. It was then rebranded as Bollywood Farms.

In 2026, Singh-Lim sought to extend the lease again when the lease expired at the end of the year.

== See also ==
- Agriculture in Singapore
- Yili Farm
