= Yili Farm =

Singaporean agricultural company

Yili Vegetation and Trading Pte Ltd

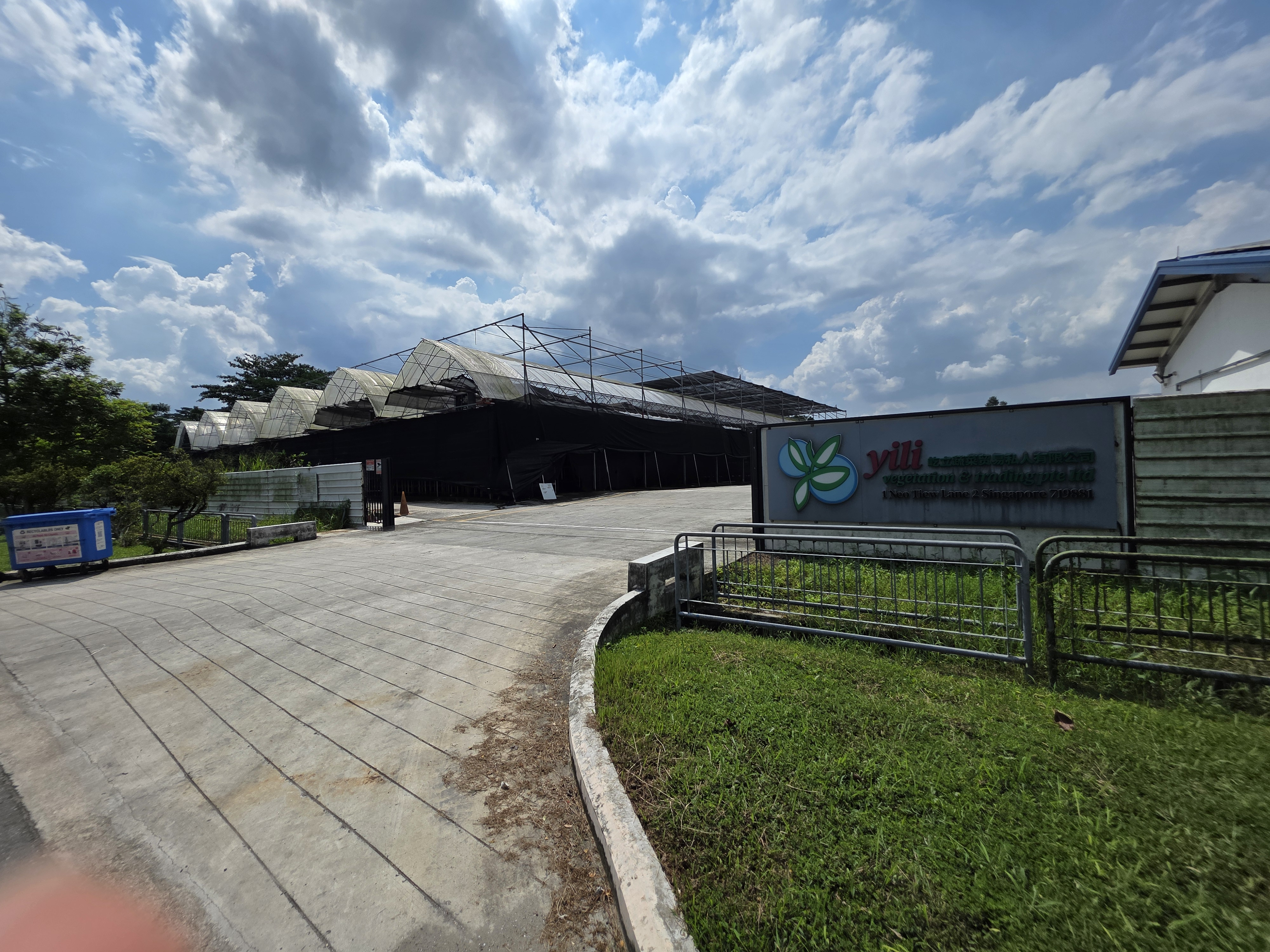
- Production facility of Yili Farm in Lim Chu Kang, North Region, Singapore.
- Type: Private
- Industry: Agriculture
- Founded: August 22, 1996; 30 years ago, Lim Chu Kang, Singapore
- Founder: Alan Toh
- Headquarters: 1 Neo Tiew Lane 2, Lim Chu Kang, Singapore
- Area served: Singapore
- Products: Agricultural crops
- Production output: 680 tonnes annually
- Website: www.yilifarm.com.sg

Yili Farm (founded as Yili Vegetation and Trading Pte Ltd) is a Singaporean agricultural company that specialises in cultivating vegetables and mushrooms located in Lim Chu Kang, in the north region of Singapore. Founded in 1996, produce cultivated by the company is distributed locally in Singapore through supermarket chains, FairPrice Finest, FairPrice Xtra and Sheng Siong.

The farm employs traditional agricultural methods and is part of Singapore's domestic food production sector. Yili Farm is certified two-star by the Singapore Food Agency, under the Good Agricultural Practice certification, which was launched in 2021.

== History ==
Yili Vegetation and Trading Pte Ltd was founded in 1996 by Alan Toh on a 4 hectares (40,000 m^{2}) plot of land in Lim Chu Kang, an area historically associated with agricultural activity in Singapore. From its establishment, Yili Farm adopted traditional agricultural methods in the cultivation of its produce. Such methods are typically characterised by soil-based farming practices rather than high-technology or vertical farming approaches, which became more prevalent in Singapore in later years.

== Operations ==
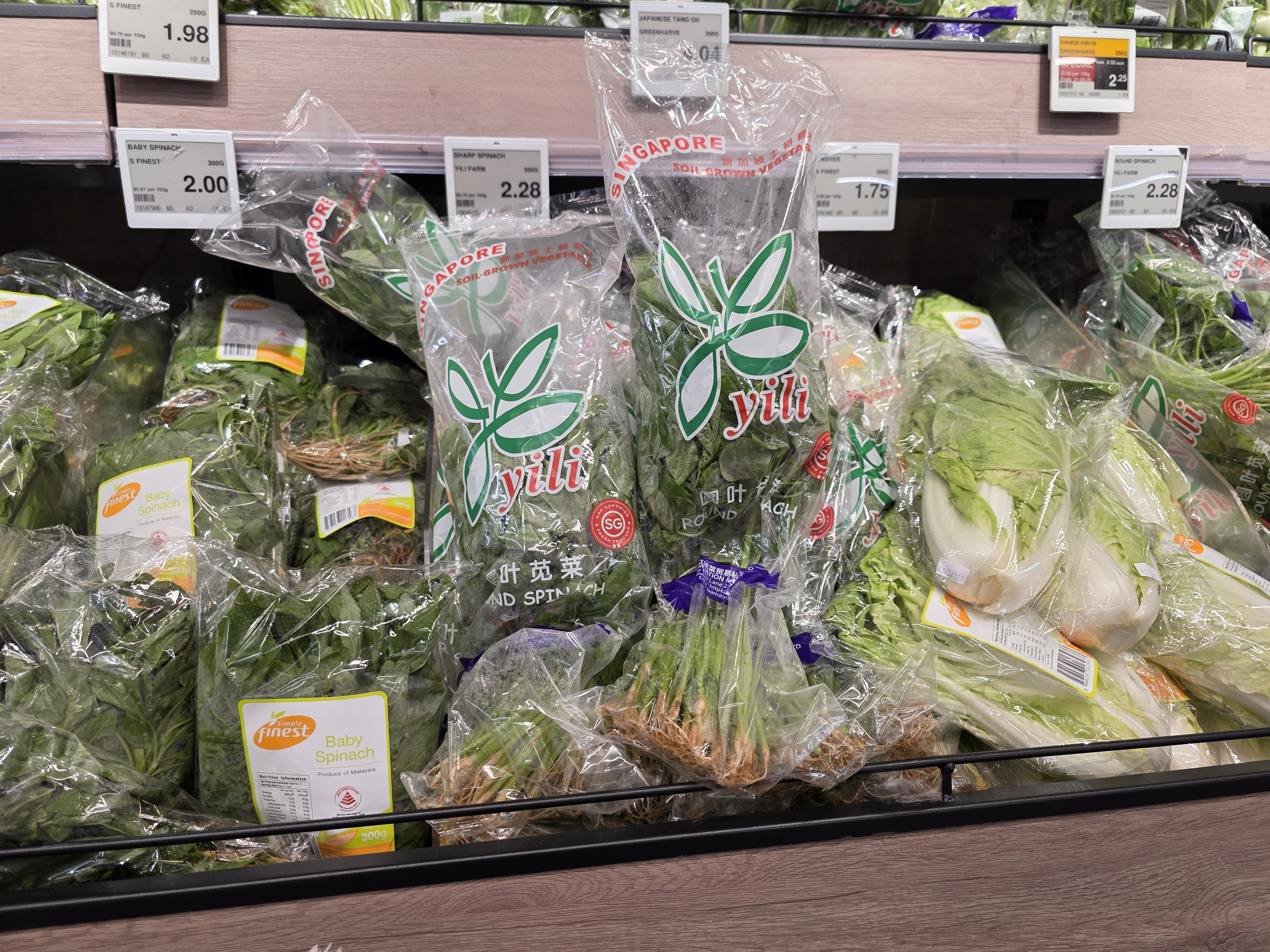
Yili's produce displayed on a shelf in a Fairprice Finest outlet.

Yili Farm specialises in vegetable farming and operates within Singapore's limited agricultural land area. As a land-scarce country that relies heavily on food imports, Singapore has identified local vegetable farms as part of its broader strategy to enhance food resilience and supply diversification.

In 2023, the company relocated operations to a 6 hectares (60,000 m^{2}) plot of land within Lim Chu Kang. The move followed the acquisition of its previous farmland to support the expansion of Tengah Air Base. According to company and media reports, the relocation enabled Yili Farm to increase production capacity and introduce greater levels of automation and climate monitoring systems within its greenhouse facilities.

The new site incorporates hydroponic farming systems alongside conventional soil-based cultivation methods. Hydroponic techniques are commonly adopted by urban and peri-urban farms in Singapore to improve land-use efficiency and crop yields within spatial constraints. These systems allow crops to be grown in a controlled environment with reduced reliance on soil. This has allowed the farm to have a production output of 680 tonnes of produce annually.

Within this context, Yili Farm has been identified as one of the local farming businesses contributing to Singapore's domestic food production and food security efforts. The farm operates alongside other Lim Chu Kang–based agricultural enterprises that collectively form a key component of Singapore's remaining rural farming sector. Produce from the farm is distributed primarily through local supermarket chains, including FairPrice Finest, FairPrice Xtra, and Sheng Siong, as well as through direct online sales via the company's website.

== See also ==
- Agriculture in Singapore
- Bollywood Farms
