= List of Kangchu system placename etymologies =

There are several places in Southeast Asia that had its roots in the Kangchu system, an organised system of administration which was introduced by the Sultanate of Johore in the territories of Johore and Singapore in the 19th century to oversee the social affairs and economy of Chinese coolies who were working in gambier and pepper plantations. Even as the gambier and pepper trade declined in the early 20th century, many of these place names were retained as some of these settlers remained behind. Place names that are associated with the Kangchu system are named after former place features such as settlements (Chu Kang, Chinese: 厝港, Peng'im: cu3 gang2), (Note: The Singaporean sitcom Phua Chu Kang is not named after a Chu Kang.) river bases (Kangkar, Chinese: 港跤, Peng'im: gang2 ka1) and port (Kang, Chinese: 港, Peng'im: gang2). These terminologies are of Chinese origins, and draw their phonology from the Teochew language.

== Malaysia ==
=== Johor ===
- Bukit Kangkar, Muar
- Kampong Kangkar, Chaah
- Kangkar Bahru, Yong Peng
- Kangkar Pulai, Johor Bahru
- Kangkar Tebrau, Johor Bahru (Chinese: 陳厝港)
- Kangkar Kambau
- Kangkar Pendas (Chinese: 谢厝港)
- Plentong (Chinese: 旧称旧鄭厝港,新鄭厝港)

== Singapore ==
=== Housing estates ===
- Choa Chu Kang
- Hougang
- Lim Chu Kang
- Sengkang
- Yio Chu Kang

=== Obsolete names ===
- Tan Chu Kang
- Chan Chu Kang
- Lau Chu Kang

The fictional character Phua Chu Kang was likely a humorous reference to "Chu Kang" place names.

== Indonesia ==
- Sinaboi or Cia Chui Kang (Chinese: 正水港), Riau
- Sungai Nyamuk or Tua Kang (Chinese: 大港), Riau

== Others ==
- Lanfang Republic, Indonesia.
- Kangkar LRT Station, Singapore.

== See also ==
- Kangchu system
- Kapitan Cina

== Bibliography ==
- Dunlop, Peter K.G., Street Names of Singapore, Who's Who Publications, 2000
- Ooi, Keat Gin, Southeast Asia: A Historical Encyclopedia, from Angkor Wat to East Timor, ABC-CLIO, 2004, ISBN 1-57607-770-5
- Singam, Durai Raja, Place-Names in Peninsular Malaysia, Archipelago, 1980
