= Neo Ao Tiew =

Chinese-Singaporean businessman and politician

- 梁後宙
- Neo Tiew with his medals, 1975.
- Born: 1884; Xiangyun Town, Nan'an, Fujian, Qing Empire
- Died: 13 November 1975 (aged 90–91); Singapore
- Resting place: Bulim Cemetery
- Occupations: businessperson, philanthropist, and sheriff/village headman
- Spouse: 6 wives
- Children: 16 sons and 12 daughters (including Neo Ah Lark)

Neo Ao Tiew (traditional Chinese: 梁後宙; simplified Chinese: 梁后宙; Pe̍h-ōe-jī: Niô͘ Āu-tiū; 1884 – 13 November 1975), MBE, S.C.H, was a Chinese businessman, philanthropist and sheriff from Nan'an, Fujian. He is best known for developing the Lim Chu Kang area of Singapore. Neo Tiew Road, located in the district of Lim Chu Kang, in the North-Western part of Singapore, is named in his honour.

== Early life ==
Neo was born in Nan'an, Fujian, Qing Dynasty in 1884. In 1914, Neo, then a young colonel in the Chinese Army, immigrated to Singapore. He built his home in the forests of Singapore and away from the main city. This house, which later became a travellers' inn, was the centre of Thong Hoe village, a village that Neo built up.

== Career ==
Neo Ao Tiew, together with British and Arabic investors, constructed roads, houses and a seaport in the Lim Chu Kang area. He also raised funds and built Lim Chu Kang Road, which was completed in 1929. With these developments, the population of Lim Chu Kang grew to 10,000 people.

Neo played the roles of judge, sheriff and mayor of the village he founded in Lim Chu Kang. As a sheriff, he ran his own vigilante police force that meted out justice in the village. Neo's police force used heavy-handed methods to police the population; for example, they paraded thieves from house to house to publicly shame them. As a result of his policing, the village recorded no crime despite having a relatively large population of 10,000 people.

In 1938, Neo founded Kay Hua School (the predecessor of the current-day Qihua Primary School) to cater to residents living in Ama Keng Village. It subsequently expanded to include 2 branch schools to serve more residents in the area. In 1980, Qihua Primary School shifted out of the Lim Chu Kang area to its current location in Woodlands. To further improve villagers' welfare, Neo also set up a maternity hospital with only one resident midwife. He was also known to personally send expectant mothers to the Kandang Kerbau Hospital.

During World War II, Neo actively raised funds from the Chinese community to support the anti-Japanese war effort. He also encouraged Chinese youths to join the British army in defending the Lim Chu Kang-Kranji port defence line from the invading Japanese army. For his efforts in the war, he was appointed a Member of the Most Excellent Order of the British Empire. After the Japanese successfully invaded Singapore, Neo fled to China to escape the Japanese's persecution. His 45 relatives who remained behind were all killed by the Japanese conquerors.

After the war, Neo returned to his former role of running the village.

Neo died in 1975 at the age of 91 or 92.

== Awards ==
Neo Ao Tiew was awarded the S.C.H. medal by King George VI after World War II. He was also awarded the Member of the Most Excellent Order of the British Empire medal by Queen Elizabeth in 1954.

For his contributions in the development of the Lim Chu Kang area, the British colonial government named a 3.5 km stretch of road as Neo Tiew Road in his honour.
