= Alligator leather =

Skin used from an alligator

Leather is created when an animal skin or hide is chemically treated in a process called tanning to preserve them for long term use as material for clothing, handbags, footwear, furniture, sports equipment and tools. Alligator leather is also commonly used to create similar items as mentioned above.

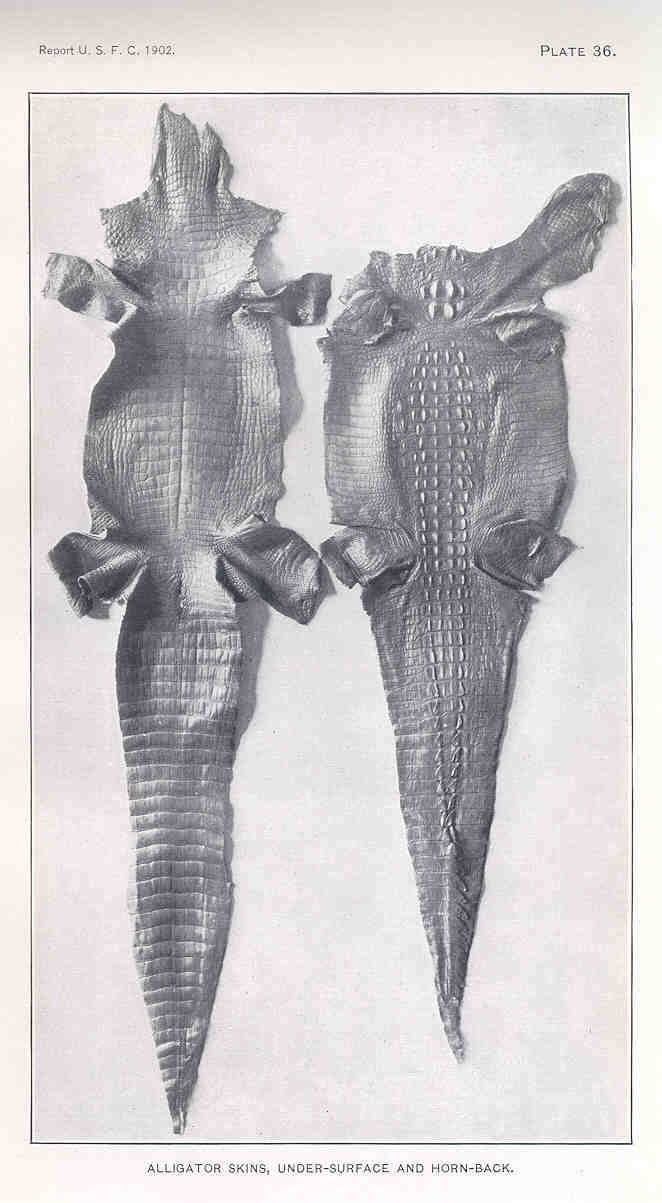
Early 20th century image of alligator skins

Alligator leather is not only used due to its durable skin, but also its natural enamel sheen, which is aesthetically pleasing for consumers buying expensive products.

== History ==
The earliest use of alligator skin was said to be in 1800 in North America. It was used to make boots, shoes, saddles and other products. Despite the first use being recorded in the 1800s, alligator skin production increased majorly during the mid-1800s. During the American Civil War in 1861, saddles and boots were made for the Confederate troops. This led to alligator leather rising to the top of choice for leather usage.

The durability and softness attributed to alligator leather today started when commercial tanning began in the early 1900s in New York, New Jersey and Europe. This brought a major increase in demand as a fashion based material. The sudden spike in demand for the leather led to alligator population decreasing in Louisiana in the mid-1900s, Louisiana being the biggest harvesting state in America. 1962 was when alligator hunting was closed statewide due to low numbers, the effect of non-regulated harvests.

By 1967, alligators made the endangered species list in America. This was not for long, however, for in 1987, alligators were no more in threat of endangerment due to the cultivation and conservation efforts that led to their numbers gradually increasing again.

== Applications ==
=== Handbags ===
Luxury brands are known to use rare and expensive materials to justify their prices. One of these sought after materials is alligator leather. One particular brand that is synonymous with high-end luxury would be Hermès. One of their most iconic and expensive bags ever made would be their Alligator Birkin that was priced at a staggering US$379,261 at auction. Luxury brands prefer the highest grade under belly section of the alligator, as they usually need a large piece of the hide. Lower grade alligator leather usually has scar tissue that would decrease the value of the product.

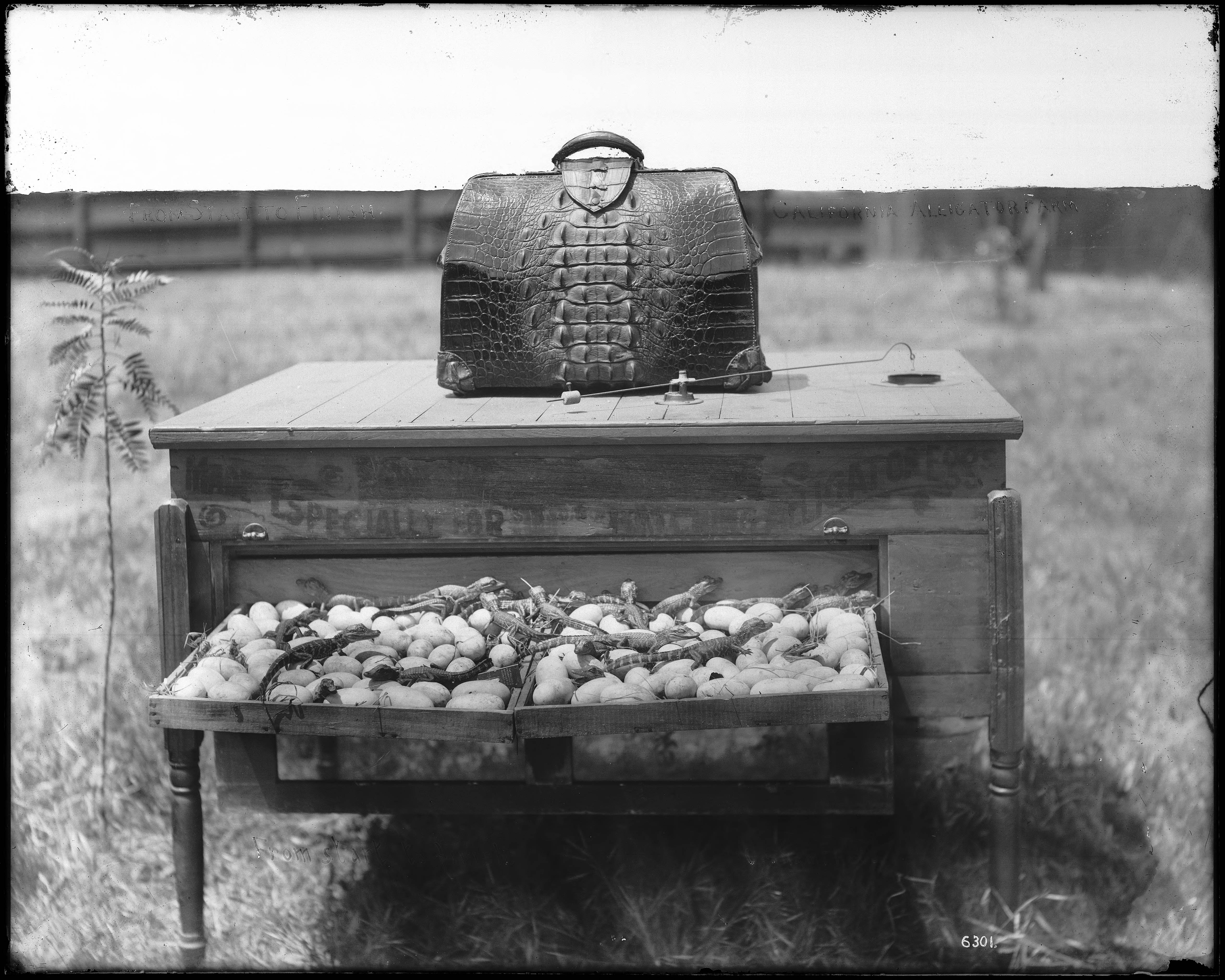
An alligator handbag rests on top of an incubator (possibly the California Alligator Farm, Los Angeles), c. 1900

=== Boots or shoes ===
Alligator leather shoes and boots are a common sight in high-end retail stores. It also is common for the American Midwest/Cowboy market to invest in alligator Leather boots or shoes due to its durability. While high-grade leather can create exceptional quality, low-grade leather can also be pieced together to create a great product.

=== Clothing ===
Leather use for clothing dates back to 1200BC when ancient Greeks used it as a material as it was durable and helped tackle different climates. While leather is still used as a material for winter clothing, due to its rarity and exclusivity, alligator leather has become a luxury. High-end expensive brands use alligator hide for clothing items, most popular being jackets and winter wear.

== Process of tanning leather ==
Tanning is the process of processing the raw skin of an animal to leather. If not done correctly, the skin is prone to bacteria and ultimately decomposition. The tanning process for alligator is a lengthy process. The process first starts with first obtaining the skin and depending on the final product the leather will be used for; the tanner will choose which part of the animal to use.

=== Extraction of skin ===
Depending on what the final product will be, tanneries dissect and process that portion of the alligator. For a softer and more malleable product, tanners choose to use the underbelly and perform a "belly cut". Usually younger farm raised alligators are chosen for this process as the skin is not as tough as an adult alligator. Underbelly hide is usually used for luxury products and so therefore farm raised alligators will not have scars or marks as wild alligators may have. This is due to the fact it is not raised in the wild and therefore does not encounter situations that would cause scars or damage to the skin.

The "hornback cut" however is used more for the raised scaly appearance that products such as belt or boot makers desire. This is the top portion of the alligator. Older wild alligators are used for this process of leather.

=== Scraping ===
The raw hide is then scraped using usually a dull tool so that it does not penetrate or cut the skin. This removes the remaining flesh and fat on the hide. Once this is done the inner portion of the skin will look white. This however does not fully remove all flesh and fat. Once this is done, wash the skin to remove any blood or flesh residue that is attached to the skin. Leave to dry.

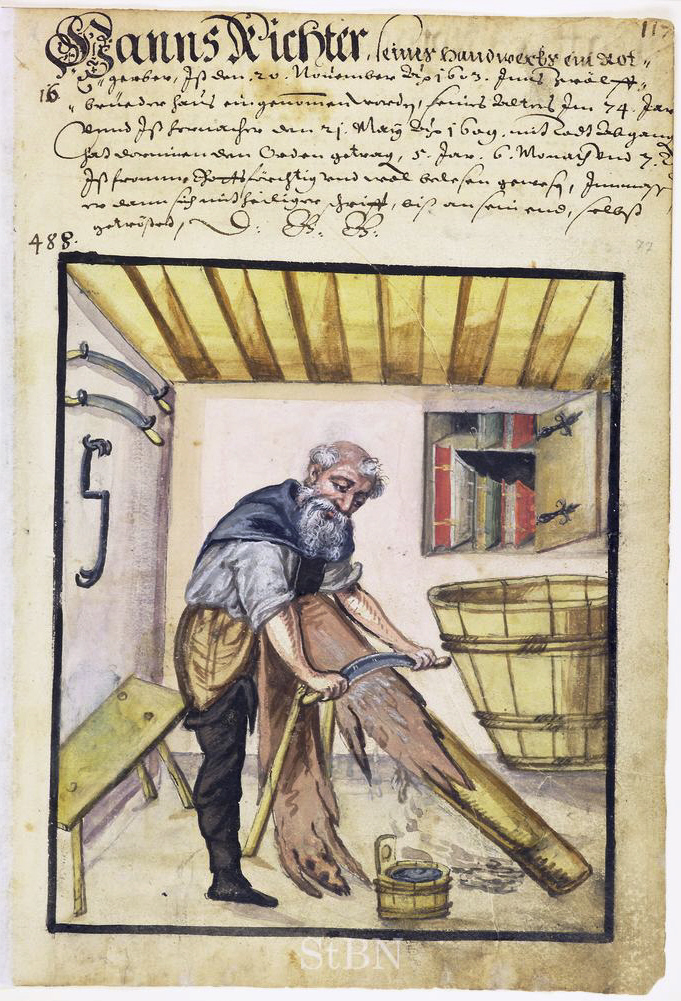
Tanner scraping raw skin, 1609

=== Dry salting ===
Once dry, a layer of salt is applied to all parts of the skin to completely dry it out. Drying out the skin will slow the process of decomposition. This process is usually done twice or three times.

=== Brining or pickling ===
Once the salting process is done, the hide is ready for brining. Brining is the chemical process that further enhances the curing process of the alligator. This is to remove any bacteria or elements that could attract bacteria, as that is what causes decomposition. To brine the hide, usually a mixture of bleach, borax and salt is added to water in a plastic drum. The alligator is then soaked in the solution for about 48 hours to completely remove any non-tannable proteins.

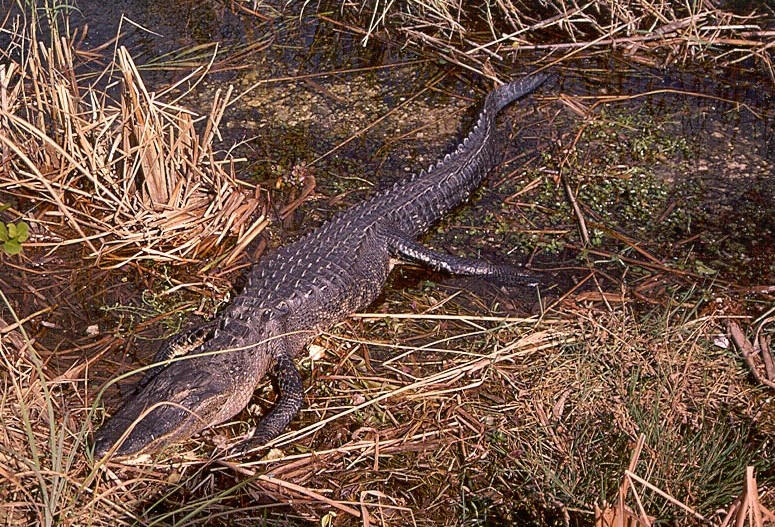
An alligator

=== Neutralizing ===
For optimum tanning acidity levels (pH level 4 or 5), sodium bicarbonate is added to the pickle solution. Throughout the pickling stage, the water must be a room temperature level. The hide is then returned to the plastic drum for another 20–30 minutes.

=== Degreasing ===
Degreasing is the process of removing any left over fat from the hide so that there is no chance of oil or fat stains. This can be done with a degreasing product or heavy duty washing liquid. The hide is placed in another plastic drum with the product or washing liquid and warm water.

== Tanning ==
Two of the most common ways to most common tanning methods and which method Alligator hide requires:

=== Vegetable tanning ===
Vegetable tanning uses the natural tannins that are found in plants, tree bark and other natural sources. This process produces brown leather that is soft and malleable. Although it is great for products such as bookbinding or early plate armour due to its softness, when in contact with water, the leather tends to shrink in size, as it is unstable. This is one of the most environmentally friendly ways to tan leather as no additional acids or chemicals are used.

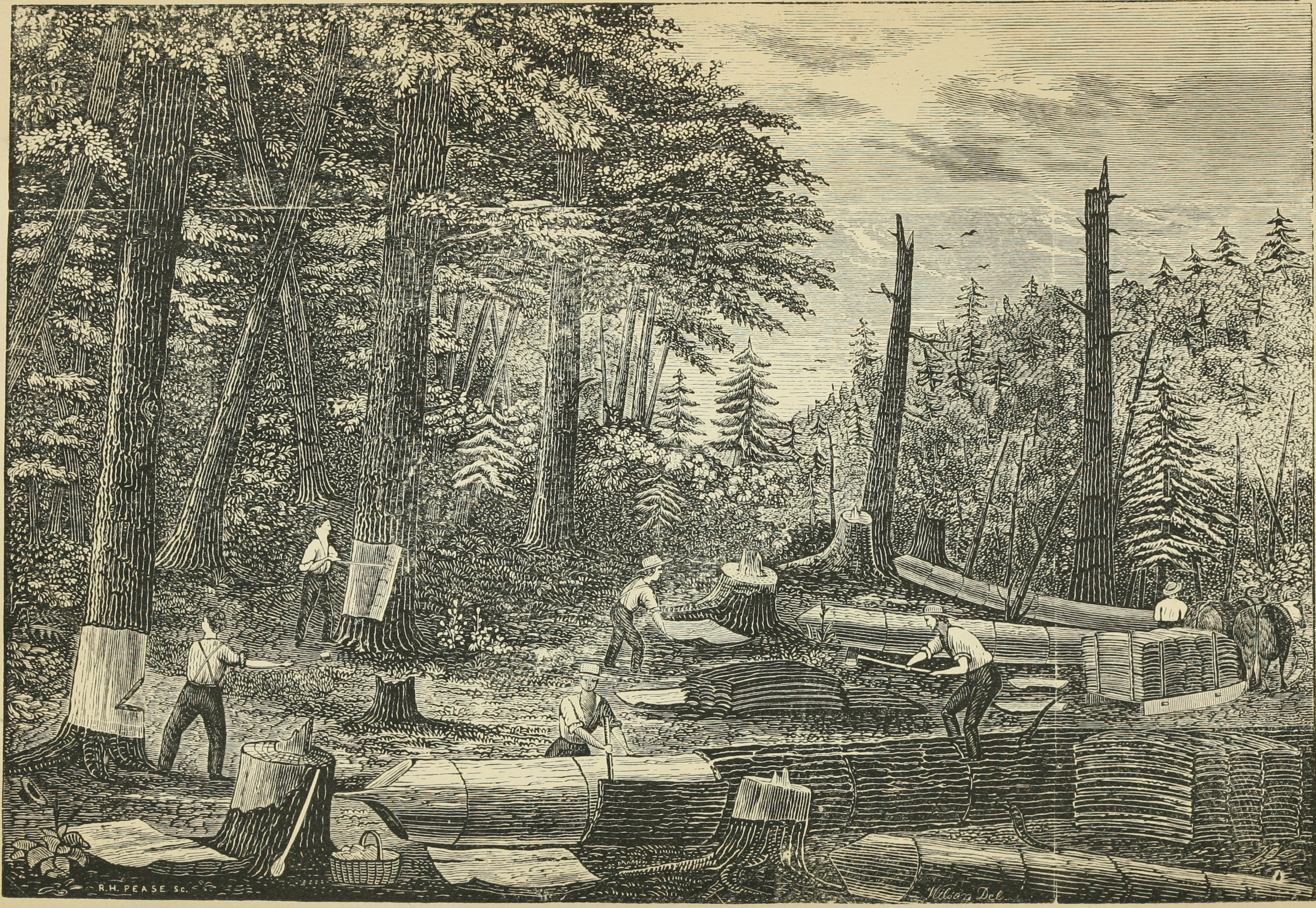
Peeling hemlock bark for vegetable tanning

==== Chromium tanned leather ====
Chromium tanning is the most popular tanning method as 90% of all leather in the world is processed this way. Alligator hide is also tanned using the Chromium process. A reason many tanneries choose to use chromium is due to the final leather product being more durable and stretchy, ideal for leather accessories and garments. The process includes submerging the hide in a toxic slush of chromium salts and chemicals to create a light blue product that is supple and durable. This process of tanning is done usually twice to soften the leather to its desired texture. Chromium tanning also creates a stronger product that is more resistant to water and creates less shrinkage when in contact.

=== Environmental impact ===
The environmental impact of leather, especially at the tanning process, has a mass negative effect. The waste product of tanning can be broken down into two categories.

==== Water waste ====
An enormous amount of polluted water is discharged from the tanning process. Almost 90% of pollution of the leather industry comes from the tanning and pre tanning stages of production. As a base calculation, tanning one ton of hide creates 20 to 80 cubic meters of polluted water. Due to chemicals raising the pH levels in the water, a large amount of chemical oxygen demand (COD) and total dissolved solids (TDS). The water also shows an increase in chloride and sulphate levels. The process also uses a large amount of water, which is not environmentally friendly.

One example of poor disposal of wastewater can be seen in Hazaribagh, Bangladesh. Ironically Hazaribagh in Urdu translates to "a thousand gardens"; quite the contrary to what the situation is like. Despite the leather industry in Bangladesh being a 1 billion dollar industry, providing thousands of jobs to many, the environmental impact is grave. The use of chromium salts, acids and toxins have caused the Buriganga River, which runs along Hazaribagh, to turn black. An estimated 21,600 cubic meters of polluted water was disposed per day in 2005.

==== Solid waste ====
Tanneries produce a huge amount of solid waste. Generally 35–60% of the total amount of solid waste is organic matter. This consists of the flesh and organic body parts of the animal. Due to decomposition, a lack of composting or efficient disposal can cause a lot of disease and unsanitary waste. This affects groundwater systems and agricultural activities as the waste is usually dumped in landfills.

=== Health complications ===
The tanning industry not only causes detrimental environmental impact, it also creates many health complications for workers in countries without effective safety regulations and protection standards. Some of these countries are China, India and Bangladesh. The toxic exposure to the chemicals in tanneries causes skin and respiratory disease amongst workers due to the lack of safety equipment and training.

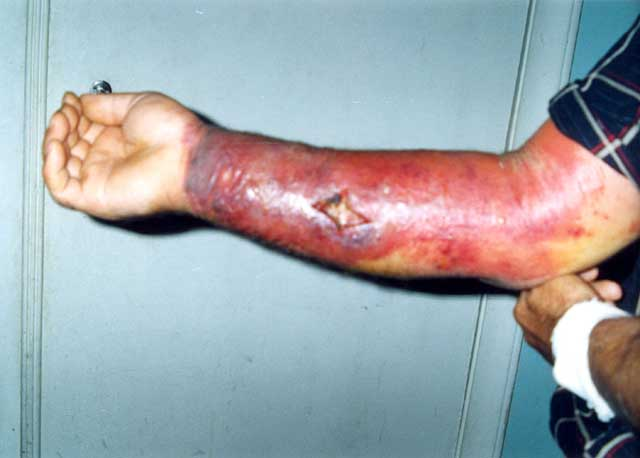
Skin reaction to anthrax

Tanneries that use chromium increase the chances of workers getting respiratory illnesses and can sometimes lead to lung, nasal or sinus cancer.

The raw hides are also a breeding ground for anthrax, a potentially deadly illness if left untreated. Chromium tanning also can severely destroy skin amongst workers. Due to unprotected handling, when the skin absorbs chromium it can leave the skin dry and cracked. The acidity of substances used in the tanning and liming stages can cause irreversible erosions in the skin. According to a 2001 report, around 90% of workers die before the age of 50 due to health complications in Hazaribagh, Bangladesh, a city well known for the low health and safety standards in its tanning industry.

== See also ==
- Crocodile skin
