= Singapore Crocodile Farm =

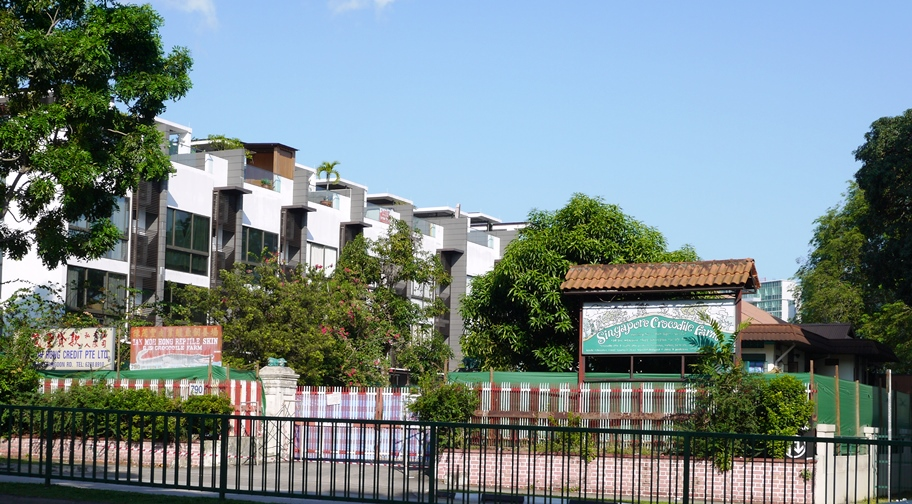
- Singapore Crocodile Farm at Upper Serangoon Road, Singapore. It closed in 2012.
- Interactive map of Singapore Crocodile Farm
- Town/City: 790 Upper Serangoon Road, Singapore 534660
- Country: Singapore
- Coordinates: 1°21′17.6″N 103°52′46.5″E
- Established: 1945; 81 years ago
- Disestablished: 2012; 14 years ago
- Owner: Tan Gna Chua
- Area: 1 acre (0.40 ha)
- Produces: Crocodile leather
- Status: Closed

The Singapore Crocodile Farm, formally the Tan Moh Hong Reptile Skin & Singapore Crocodile Farm and formerly Tan Moh Hong Reptile Skin Farm, was a crocodile farm formerly located at 790 Upper Serangoon Road in Singapore.

== Background ==
Following the end of World War II, the 1-acre (0.40 ha) facility was started in 1945 by entrepreneur Tan Gna Chua on his residential home premises at Upper Serangoon Road.

The farm began modestly with just 10 crocodiles in Tan's backyard but soon expanded into a 90,000 square-foot facility as Tan Moh Hong Reptile Skin Farm. Originally created to share Tan's passion for crocodiles, the farm also supplied skins to his tannery within its premises, produced items such as shoes, wallets, belts, and handbags which would also be exported overseas.

The farm was later opened to the public. In February 1972, it received much publicity in the media when Lord Louis Mountbatten, the 1st Earl Mountbatten of Burma, his wife Edwina, and family, paid a private visit to the farm.

Tan Gna Chua died in 2000 at an age of 85, leaving behind an estimated $30 million worth of assets, which caused legal disputes between the children of Tan Gna Chua's two wives.

The farm was eventually closed in 2012 with its former site consisted of 790 Upper Serangoon Road and another adjoined site being 1 Surin Road were sold in a tender conducted by Colliers International to the Nobel Design Holdings and Pinnacle Asset Group. The strata landed housing project known as One Surin was built in 2014 on these sites and was completed in 2017.
