= Yio Chu Kang =

- Subzone of Ang Mo Kio Planning Area

Name transcription(s)
  - Chinese: 杨厝港 (Simplified) 楊厝港 (Traditional); Yángcuògǎng (Pinyin); Iôⁿ-chhù-káng (Hokkien POJ)
  - Malay: Yio Chu Kang
  - Tamil: இயோ சூ காங் Iyō cū kāṅ (Transliteration)
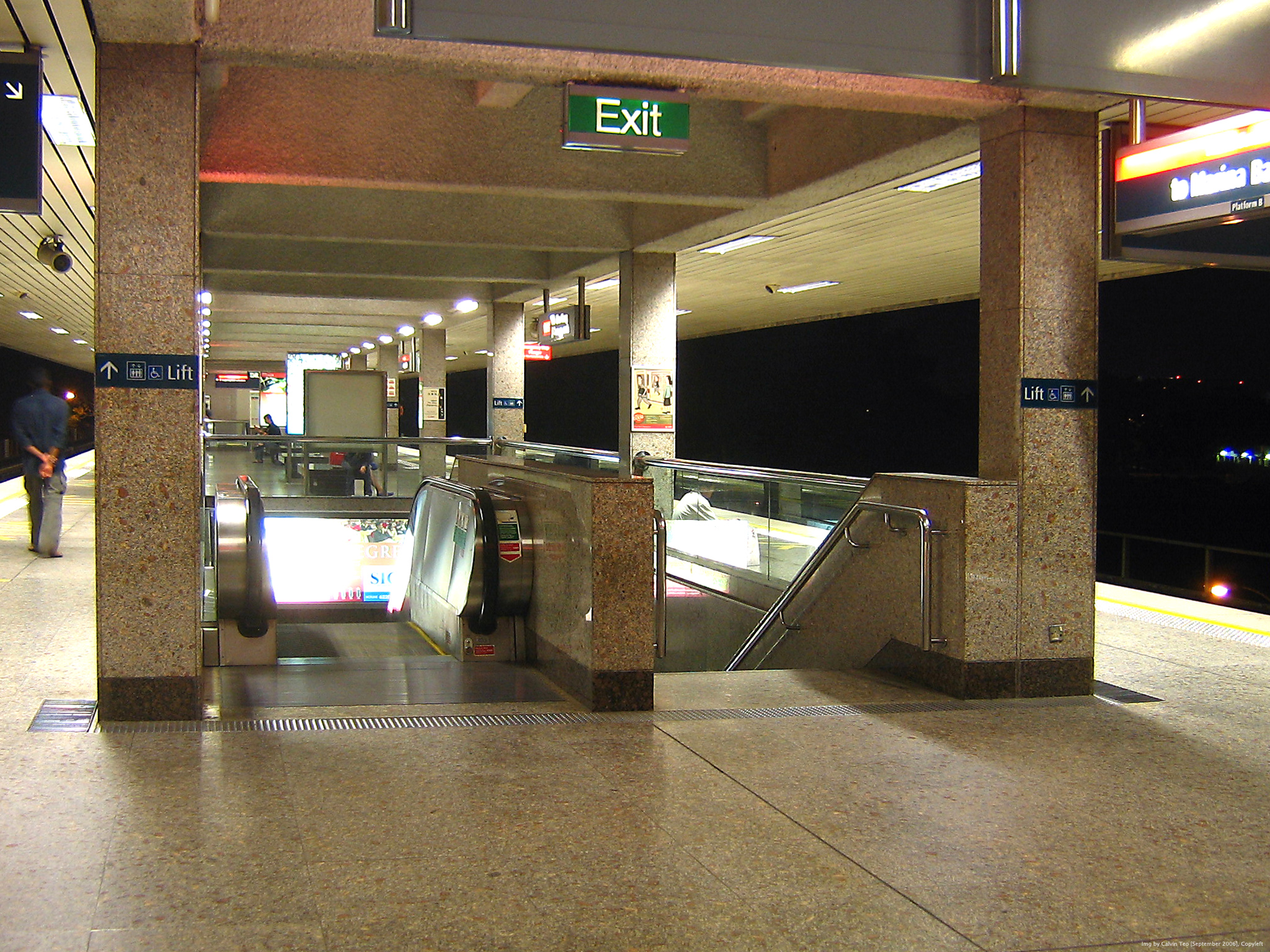
- Yio Chu Kang MRT station
- Interactive map of Yio Chu Kang
- Coordinates: 01°22′52″N 103°50′39″E
- Country: Singapore

Area
  - Total: 0.91 km^{2} (0.35 sq mi)

Population (2026)
  - Total: 540
  - Density: 590/km^{2} (1,500/sq mi)

Yio Chu Kang (IPA: /ˌjoʊ ˌtʃuː ˈkɑːŋ/ YOH CHOO KAHNG), alternatively spelt as Yeo Chu Kang, is a subzone of Ang Mo Kio in the northeast of Singapore.

== Background ==
The name Yio Chu Kang, similar to Choa Chu Kang and Lim Chu Kang, derives from the term "chu kang" (厝港, Teochew: cu3 gang2), meaning "back port". A chu kang was a settlement in backwater parts of rivers in Singapore which served as a port to ship out agricultural products, mainly gambier and pepper, grown on adjacent plantations under the Kangchu economic system in 19th century Johor and Singapore.

== Educational institutions ==
=== Primary schools ===
- Anderson Primary School

=== Secondary schools ===
- Presbyterian High School
- Yio Chu Kang Secondary School

=== Tertiary Institutions ===
- Nanyang Polytechnic
- Anderson Serangoon Junior College
- ITE College Central

== Other amenities ==
- Yio Chu Kang Stadium
- Chu Sheng Temple
- Swee Kow Kuan Temple
- Yio Chu Kang Community Club

== Transportation ==
Situated at the northern portion of Ang Mo Kio, Yio Chu Kang is served by bus services originating from Yio Chu Kang Bus Interchange, Seletar Bus Depot, Ang Mo Kio Bus Interchange and Yishun (85x services). Yio Chu Kang MRT station of the North–South Line also serves the area, providing residents a direct link to the relatively distant Central Area.

== Politics ==
Yio Chu Kang mostly forms the boundaries of the eponymous SMC which was first created in the 1980 election. In 1991, when Ang Mo Kio have new town developments, Yio Chu Kang was absorbed into the Ang Mo Kio GRC, where its Town Council was based in. It was briefly hived back into an SMC in 2006 which lasted for just one election, then reinstated into a SMC since the 2020 election taking in the Sembawang Hills and some of Lentor areas. The SMC had a minor change in the 2025 election where a polling district inside the Thomson Grove condominium was redistricted to the neighbouring Kebun Baru.

== See also ==
- List of Kangchu system placename etymologies
