= Society for the Prevention of Cruelty to Animals Singapore =

Singaporean animal welfare charity

- Named after: Royal Society for the Prevention of Cruelty to Animals
- Established: March 27, 1876; 150 years ago
- Founded at: Singapore, Straits Settlements
- Type: Animal protection
- Headquarters: 50 Sungei Tengah Road, Singapore 699012
- Location: Singapore, Singapore
- Affiliations: Royal Society for the Prevention of Cruelty to Animals
- Website: spca.org.sg

The Society for the Prevention of Cruelty to Animals Singapore is a registered animal welfare charity in Singapore.

== History ==
The Society for the Prevention of Cruelty to Animals (SPCA, to differentiate from the British RSPCA) was established in Singapore on 27 March 1876. A committee, consisting of W.H. Read and John Cameron, the editor of The Straits Times, was to oversee its activities with William Adamson acting as its Chair and D.E.A. Hervey as the Honorary Secretary. The society's mission was to "inquire into the present law and to suggest such amendments and additions to it as may seem necessary for the carrying out of the objects of the Society." A subscription for membership cost $3 per year, or $25 for lifetime.

In July 1878, the SPCA published its first annual report, highlighting the treatment of working animals:

No matter how small they may be, weak or strong, sick or well, they are employed in conveying loads frequently above their strength, as for instance a cart load of bricks, about 400 to the load, weighing...1 ton 8 cwt [1.4 metric tons]. They are often beaten throughout the journey, and goaded on with those favorite native methods of torture - twisting the tails or progging with a point in tender places.

By the mid-1880s, the SPCA held regular meetings among its members and actively addressed complaints involving the mistreatment of animals. Among its notable representatives was Inspector E.F. Paglar, who brought to court nine cases of animal abuse that resulted in the offender's incarceration in 1885. With the increasing involvement of municipal officials, including engineer James MacRitchie and coroner Alexander Gentle, both present at a meeting in July 1890, the Society began to debate the definition of cruelty in public with the stated goal of promoting awareness.

== Modern Days ==
After the Japanese occupation of Singapore, the RSPCA, as it was known then, was restarted by Miss Lucia Bach, an Englishwoman. She ran a boarding house and also took in unwanted stray animals.

In 1954, the RSPCA was set up formally and moved to Orchard Road, facilitated by the presence of an RSPCA from England to run the operation and train an inspector. Two additional staff members were hired as a telephone operator and a driver of its first official vehicle.

When Singapore ceased to be a crown colony in 1959, RSPCA was renamed the SPCA. In 1984, the SPCA moved to 31 Mount Vernon Road after the Government acquired the Orchard Road land.

The Singapore SPCA plays an important role in animal rescue. It is not government funded and depend on donations, charity organizations, memberships and money from selling of SPCA merchandise from the public.

The Singapore SPCA receives more than 400 unwanted, abandoned or abused animals. They also depend on volunteers who are willing to lend a helping hand to the SPCA.

== Objectives and services ==
The Singapore SPCA's two main objectives are to promote kindness to animals and birds, and to prevent cruelty to animals and birds.

The SPCA provides various animal welfare services to the community including investigation of cruelty complaints, a 24-hour emergency service for sick, injured and very young animals and an adoption programme.

== Financial information ==
The Singapore SPCA relies primarily on donations from the public to fund its operations.

In 2010, they received over S$2.2 million from various avenues such as cash donations, membership fees, fund-raising events and sales of souvenirs and pet supplies. In that same year, their total expenditure was over S$2.1 million.

In 2024, they generated S$5.65 million in income and their total expenditure was S$4.17 million.

== See also ==
- Animal Rights
- Cruelty to animals
- Humane Society
- Overpopulation (animals)
- List of voluntary welfare organisations in Singapore
