= Agriculture in Singapore =

Agriculture in Singapore is a small industry, contributing less than 0.5 percent of the country gross domestic product (GDP), as of 2010. There was a total of 153 land-based and 72 sea-based food farms in 2024, with value of total local food production estimated at S$231 million. Singapore also produces non-food agriculture items such as orchids, ornamental and foliage plants and ornamental fish for export and domestic markets. Singapore is a global exporter of quality cut orchids and ornamental fish.

In March 2019, the government of Singapore set the "30 by 30" goal which aims to produce 30% of its nutritional needs locally by 2030. In 2024, hen shell eggs, vegetable, and seafood farms contributed around 34%, 3%, and 6%, of Singapore's total food consumption respectively.

In November 2025, the government said it will revise its local production targets to produce 20 per cent of the country’s consumed fibre, such as leafy vegetables, and 30 per cent of protein, including seafood and eggs, by 2035. As of 2024, local consumption of Singapore-produced food items in the fibre and protein category are 8 percent and 26 percent respectively.

== History ==
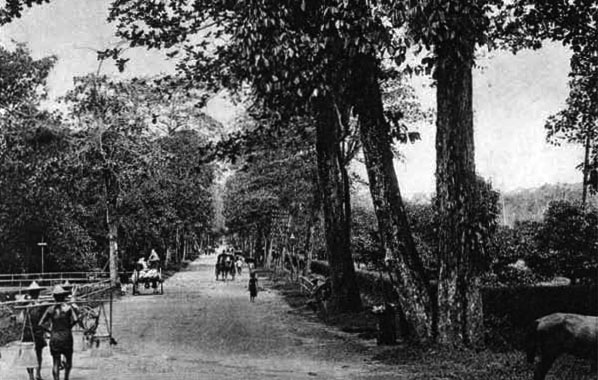
Orchard Road, c. 1900.

In 1987, there were officially 2,075 farms in Singapore, covering an area of 2,037 hectares (5,030 acres), an average of less than 1 hectare (2.5 acres) per farm.

Before modernised development, Orchard Road was a stretch of agricultural orchards. As with many other areas, the farms there soon began to disappear, and Singapore became more reliant on overseas imports. One major issue in 1984 was the health concerns with pig farms in Singapore, concerning the pollution of the environment.

== Major agricultural products ==
=== Food crops ===
Singapore's local food production focuses on hen eggs, vegetables, and seafood. Vegetables produced locally include leafy greens like bayam (Chinese spinach), choy sum, bok choy, kangkong (water spinach), beansprouts and some mushrooms. For seafood, commonly farmed species include Asian seabass (barramundi), red snapper, groupers, milkfish, and grey mullet.

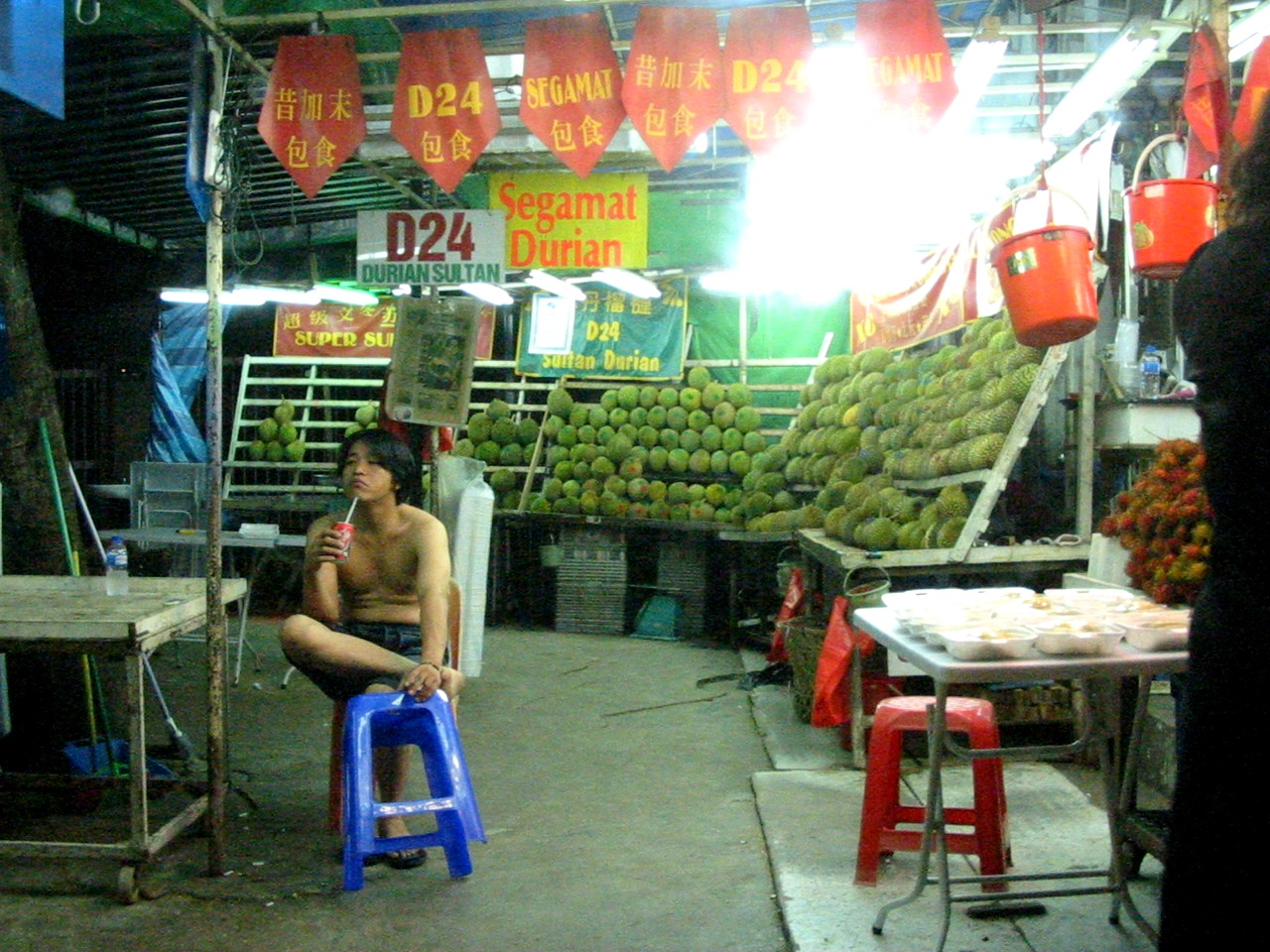
A durian stall in Singapore.

A small quantity of tropical fruits such as rambutans, and mangosteens are also farmed in Singapore.

=== Non-food crops ===
Singapore's non-food agriculture sector is a niche, high-value industry focused primarily on orchids and ornamental fish. Singapore is a global exporter of both items, and key export markets include Japan, the United States, Australia, and territories in Western Europe.

Notable companies and exporters include Qian Hu Corporation Limited (ornamental fish), Sunbeam Aquarium (ornamental fish) and Orchidville (orchid).

== Local Production & Food Security ==
About 90 percent of the country's food comes from overseas imports, making food security an important issue. The COVID-19 pandemic further highlighted the vulnerabilities to Singapore's food supply.

=== Local production ===
Agricultural activity in Singapore is primarily concentrated in the rural districts of Lim Chu Kang and Sungei Tengah. Lim Chu Kang, located within the north region of Singapore, is the country’s principal agricultural zone, housing farms engaged in food production, aquaculture, ornamental fish breeding, and agri-food technology development. Sungei Tengah, located within the Western Water Catchment area, a protected water catchment region in western Singapore, is another district that houses some of the country's agricultural activities. Parts of the area have historically been used for agricultural and farming activities due to its rural land use and low urban density. Together, these districts form Singapore’s principal agricultural zone, accommodating farms engaged in food production, aquaculture, ornamental fish breeding, and agri-food technology research and development.

In November 2023, indoor farm I.F.F.I's holding company, precision engineering firm TranZPlus Engineering, filed for insolvency. In April 2024, I.F.F.I vacated its farm at its 38,000 sq m facility at the Space@Tuas and left all its equipment. The farm officially closed in May. It was a former recipient of the 30x30 Express grant in 2020.

Singapore's Local Food Production Statistics
	2019	2020	2021	2022	2023	2024
Total Value Of Local Production (S$ million)	166	163	186	207	233	231
Local Production of Seafood (tonnes)	5,335	4,567	5,069	4,440	4,090	3,533
Local Production of Vegetables (tonnes)	24,296	22,793	23,506	19,881	16,915	16,391
Local Production of Hen Shell Eggs (mil pieces)	528	616	644	609	685	773

Source: Singapore Department of Statistics - Agriculture and Aquaculture

=== Targets ===
In March 2019, the government of Singapore set the "30 by 30" goal which aims to produce 30% of its nutritional needs locally by 2030. More land was tendered for agricultural use, accompanied by requirements and incentives for deployment of higher productivity technologies. To develop the agriculture and agri-technology sector, the following key sector-specific programs and schemes were pushed out between 2019-2021:

- 30x30 Express: $30 million competitive grant program launched by the Singapore Food Agency (SFA) in 2020, awarded to vegetable, fish and egg farms expanding farming capacity using high-tech and controlled environment farming methods
- Agri-food Cluster Transformation (ACT) Fund: $60 million fund introduced by SFA in April 2021 to support local farms in adopting technology and advanced farming systems along the farm-to-fork value chain
- Singapore Food Story R&D grant: S$144 million was set aside for researchers, institutions and companies seeking to develop and commercialize agri-tech solutions with a focus on controlled environment settings

Notwithstanding the above efforts, local production of food crops, with exception of hen shell eggs have declined. According to the annual Singapore Food Statistics published by the Singapore Food Agency, from 2019 - 2024:

- Hen shell egg production has increased from 528 million pieces to 773 million pieces
- Vegetable production has declined from 24.3 thousand tonnes to 16.4 thousand tonnes
- Seafood production has declined from 5.3 thousand tonnes to 3.5 thousand tonnes

In end 2025, after a year review of the "30 by 30" goal, new targets were set instead:

- Produce 20 per cent of the country’s consumption of fibre by 2035
- Produce 30 per cent of the country’s consumption of protein (comprises both eggs and seafood) by 2035

It was also reported that In 2024, eight per cent of fibre and 26 per cent of protein consumed in Singapore was produced domestically. However during June, it was reported that only three per cent of vegetables produced domestically. SFA clarified that the fibre category was reduced with fewer vegetable types and hence the new figure of eight per cent.

== Governance ==
From 1 April 2019, Singapore Food Agency took over food-related functions previously carried out by former Agri-Food & Veterinary Authority of Singapore, National Environment Agency, and Health Sciences Authority. From 1 April 2019, National Parks Board took over non-food, plant and animal related functions previously carried out by former Agri-Food & Veterinary Authority.

The Singapore Food Agency (SFA) is a statutory board under the Ministry of Sustainability and the Environment that oversees food safety and security in Singapore.

== See also ==
- Economy of Singapore
- List of countries with organic agriculture regulation
- Organic farming by country
