= Neil Humphreys =

British author (born 1974)

- Born: Neil John Humphreys; 5 December 1974 (age 51); Dagenham, London, England
- Education: Sydney Russell School
- Alma mater: Manchester University
- Occupations: Author, Journalist, Radio host, Podcaster
- Notable work: Notes From an Even Smaller Island, Marina Bay Sins, Abbie Rose and the Magic Suitcase, Princess Incognito
- Children: 1
- Website: www.neilhumphreys.com

Neil John Humphreys (born 5 December 1974) is a British author and columnist based in Singapore. He has written 30 books.

Brought up in Dagenham, London, England, Humphreys migrated to Singapore in 1996, left for Australia in 2006 and came back to Singapore in 2011. He worked as a humour columnist, first at TODAY and then The Straits Times and The New Paper. Humphreys continues to write for newspapers, magazines and websites in Singapore, Malaysia, Japan, Australia, and the UK. His humour, football and lifestyle columns have appeared in FourFourTwo, Esquire, The New Paper, The Age, The Straits Times and TODAY. He now writes for Yahoo and hosts an award-winning football podcast.

Humphreys is currently working on an Abbie Rose and the Magic Suitcase TV series and his Inspector Low crime novels are also being developed for TV .

== Career ==
Humphreys began as a speech and drama teacher, teaching at primary and secondary schools across Singapore, including Victoria School.

Humphreys was a humour columnist with local newspaper Today. He contributed to its sports section, mostly with news related to the English Premier League, and its entertainment section, with regular movie reviews. He later wrote for The Straits Times. He now writes for Yahoo.

But he was best known for his humorous columns poking fun at various facets of life in Singapore, and revealing aspects of his childhood in working-class London. He once said that he speaks with a Cockney accent.

== Migration ==
Neil Humphreys left Singapore for Australia with his wife in 2006. He lived in Victoria for five years. In 2007, he started writing for The Straits Times, ARENA Singapore, Tiger Airways' in-flight magazine and Young Parents.

In August 2011, Humphreys returned to Singapore and kicked off a new humour column with The New Paper. He also released a new book, Return to a Sexy Island, humorously describing how Singapore had changed while he was away.

== Personal life ==
Humphreys is married. He writes about his wife frequently in his columns and books. They have a daughter. Humphreys' mother lives in Kent, England.

== Works ==
=== Books ===
- Notes From an Even Smaller Island (2001)
- Scribbles from the Same Island (2003)
- Final Notes from a Great Island (2006)
- Complete Notes From Singapore The Omnibus Edition (2007)
- Be My Baby: on the Road to Fatherhood (2008)
- Match Fixer (2010)
- Premier Leech (2011)
- Return to a Sexy Island: Notes from New Singapore (2012)
- Secrets of the Swamp (2013)
- Marina Bay Sins (2014)
- Saving a Sexier Island: Notes from Old Singapore (2015)
- The Hunt for the Green Boomerang (2015)
- Rich Kill Poor Kill (2016)
- Abbie Rose and the Magic Suitcase (2012–2018)
- Princess Incognito series (2018–2023)
- Bloody Foreigners (2021)
- The Pet Adventure (2022)
- Lost Women (2023)

=== TV ===
- Singtel Mio Football TV (2012–2014)
- Return to a Sexy Island (2013)
- Eleven Sports' The Social (2017)
