= Crocodile skin =

Skin or hide of a crocodile

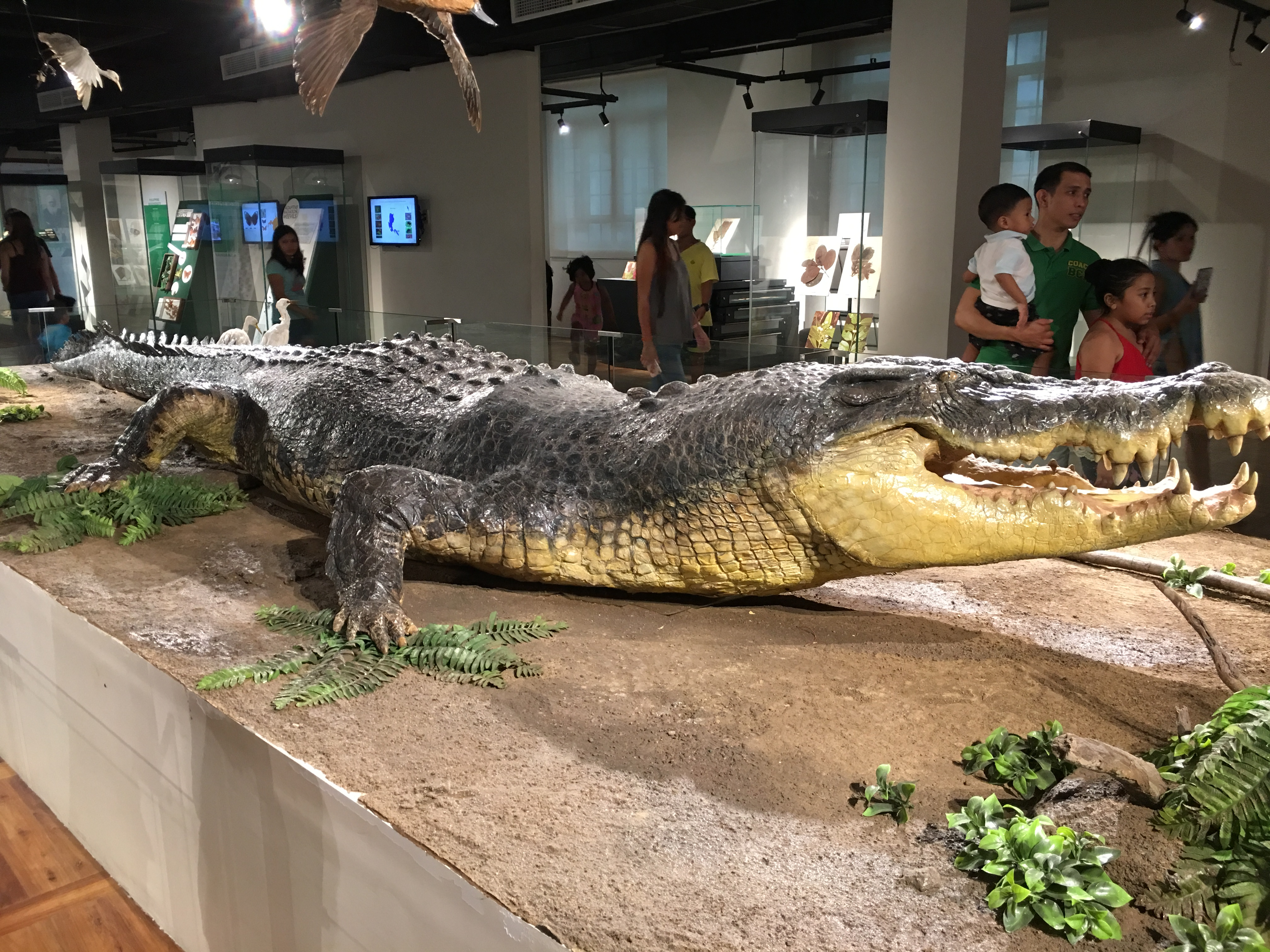
Taxidermied skin of Lolong, the largest crocodile ever held in captivity

Crocodile skin either refers to the skin of a live crocodile or a leather made from dead crocodile hide. It has multiple applications across the fashion industry such as use for bags, shoes, and upholstery after being farmed and treated in specialist farms and tanneries.

== Crocodile leather ==
Crocodile leather is the processed hide of one of 23 crocodile species in the world. Crocodile leather is an exotic leather which as a group, makes up less than 1% of the world's leather production. It is rare compared to other hides such as sheep or cow and requires high levels of craftsmanship to prepare it for use in the consumer industry. Crocodile leather is considered a luxury item utilized by high fashion brands such as Hermes, Louis Vuitton Moet Hennessy (LVMH) and Gucci. As a material, crocodile leather is rare and expensive because of limited numbers of crocodiles, their relatively small size and the scarcity of dependable farms and tanning facilities to process and prepare the product for market.

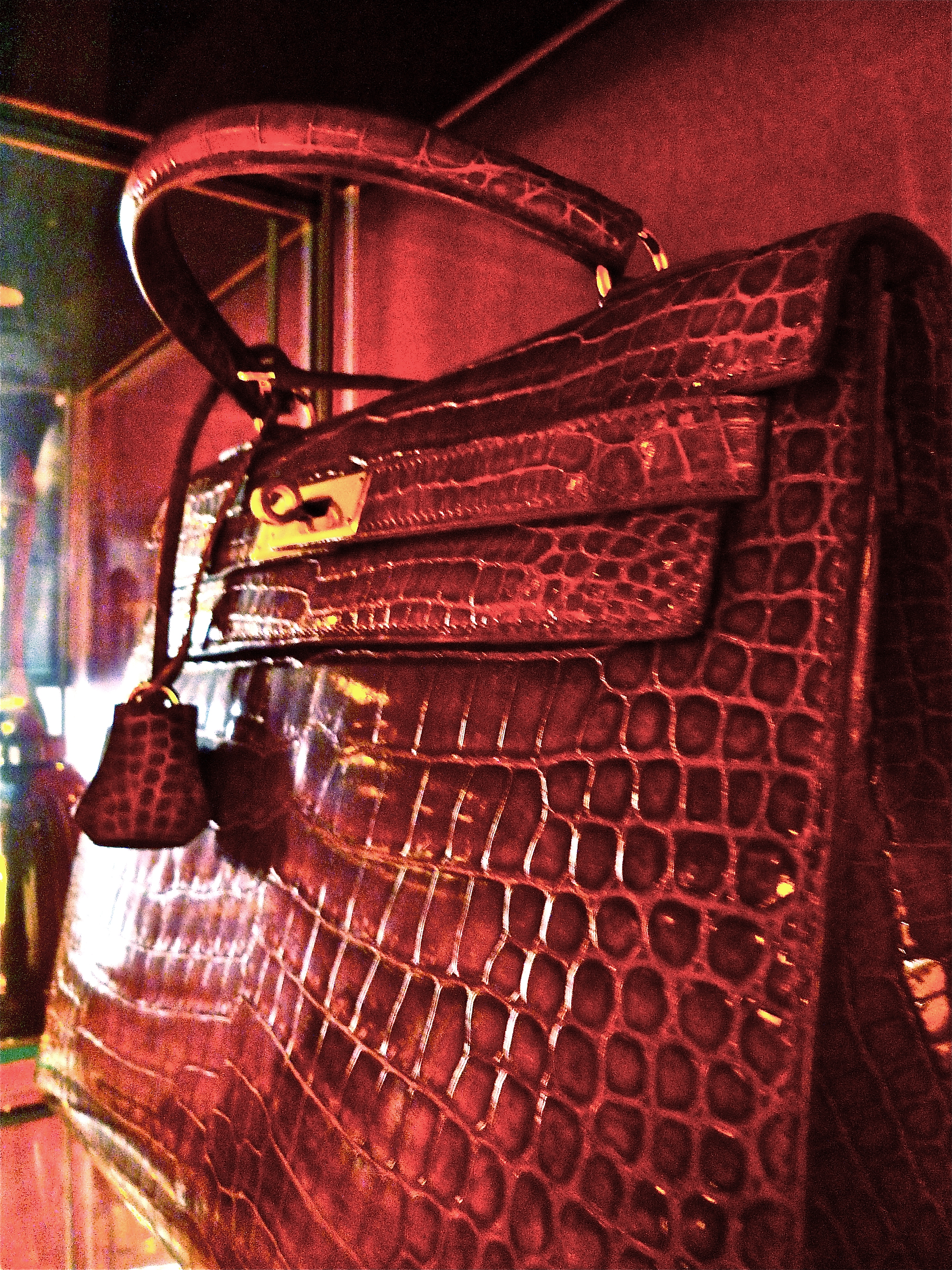
Red Crocodile Kelly Bag

== Applications and uses ==
Crocodile skin is primarily used in the production of handbags and other luxury items such as shoes, belts, wallets, upholstery, and furniture. For these products, Freshwater, Saltwater, Nile and Caiman are used because of the superior quality of skin which when tanned has an aesthetic finish. Not all these skins are valued the same. As one of the largest crocodile species, the Australian Saltwater Crocodile has a reputation for having the most desirable and high-quality hide. This makes it more popular than the smaller Caiman skins which, as a more common species, is a cheaper option. The value of a skin is dependent on what it will be used for. Freshwater Crocodile, particularly from New Guinea, is known for its flexibility which allows processors to skive it down to a thinness suitable for clothing whereas Nile crocodile, mostly available across Africa, is durable, making it desirable for heavy-duty items such as footwear and belts.

== Farming ==
Crocodiles are either farmed or wild-caught. In Northern and Western Australia crocodile farms carry out ranching which includes captive breeding and harvesting of eggs from the wild. Eggs are collected and landowners sell the eggs to local farms to breed. In 2018 this method also became legal in Queensland.

On a crocodile farm, crocodiles are grown and prepared for slaughter before their skin is removed, treated, and sent to be tanned in specialist tanneries and used in the manufacture of commercial goods.

1. Ranching – this is the collection of wild eggs. Collection usually occurs in February and March.
2. Hatching – the eggs are incubated and protected to ensure the highest yield.
3. Growth – the crocodiles are grown to certain sizes dependent on what the skin will be used for. For example, most bags will require a 40 cm belly skin which will require a crocodile of generally 1.5 years old or 1.2 m long. The requirements vary depending on what is fashionable at the time, for example, if there is a trend for small handbags then a farm will reduce the growth stage and instigate slaughter earlier as smaller skins are required by the fashion industry. It is a case of supply and demand; if crocodile skin suits are "in fashion" then crocodile farmers will need to provide the fashion industry with larger skins suitable for such production.
4. Stunning – Once the crocodiles have reached the desired size, the crocodile is stunned with a rod and its eyes are covered to calm it. They are then sent to abattoirs where skins and meat are removed for sale.
5. Slaughter – Humane slaughter is carried out by the severing of the spinal cord.
6. Disinfection – According to food-safety guidelines the skin is disinfected.
7. Chilling – Before skinning the carcass is left in a cold room. This often takes place overnight.
8. Skinning – Skin is carefully removed.
9. Meat Processing – meat is removed and packaged according to food safety requirements.
10. Skin Processing – the processing of the removed skin involves short and long term preservation, grading and measurement and storage until dispatch.

The main farm income is in crocodile skin for the fashion industry. It is important the skin is of good quality to achieve the highest revenue possible. Preservation is essential as quality of skin reduces substantially in warm conditions where the farms tend to be situated. To add value to skins, some farms include fleshing at the stage of short term preservation. Fleshing is usually carried out by tanners and is the trimming, scraping and removal of remaining muscle tissue using sharp equipment and high power water jets. It is often considered risky for farms to complete the fleshing process as the skin may be damaged, a costly mistake. 1 skin costs $12 in labor, not including operating or capital costs. Therefore, fleshing is usually carried out by tanners.

== Value, quality and measurements ==
The skin is the most valuable part of a crocodile, followed by the meat and other body parts such as teeth. Value is decided in two ways: size and grade. Greater width increases the value of the skin and is measured across the third raised scute. The grade is measured on a scale of damage to the skin and value is deducted by 25% at each level. Therefore, skin value can drop significantly if the quality is not maintained by careful handling.

The value of first-grade skin per cm is $9 (US), a 40 cm of skin therefore costs $360. For every imperfection, value decreases which is why crocodile farmers take precautionary measures such as covering corners of enclosures with plastic, to keep their crocodiles in good condition. Crocodiles are put into smaller groups to prevent fights and spread of infections are known to lead to scarring and damage of skin which will affect the value of leather.

The value of a skin is dependent on how much it is desired by fashion houses such as Louis Vuitton, Yves Saint Laurent and Hermes. Premium skins are usually transported to countries such as France, Italy and the United States of America where the most reputable tanneries treat the skins according to the designer's wishes and make them ready for manufacture into commercial goods such as bags, shoes and accessories. In Australia, (both a producer and manufacturer of crocodile hide) businesses like Di Croco offer custom products to customers and also use lesser skins and by-products to minimize waste.

Quality can be improved up to the point of slaughter and from here only maintained or reduced. Skin must be preserved carefully as after slaughter there is a loss of immune response and it becomes susceptible to microbial contamination such as scale slip, staining and discoloration and biological damage, e.g. bacterial or fungal infection. In short term preservation, a 60% brine solution is used for up to five days. In long term preservation, a commercial biocide is required which allows the skin to be kept for up to four months. The skins are kept in sealed individual bags, though not vacuum packed, to minimize exposure, prevent creasing and simplify handling. Farmers and tanners use specific methods of folding or rolling skins to prevent creases forming across the scales.

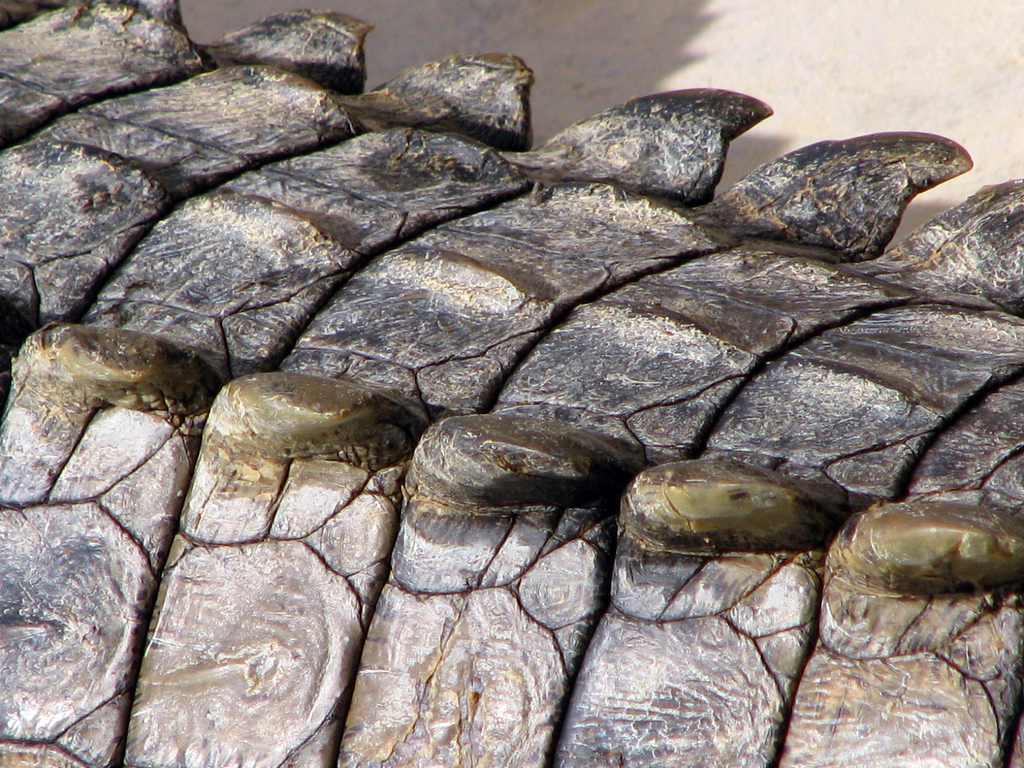
The rough-textured scutes of crocodile hide present in the back cut.

There are 2 main cuts of crocodile skin:

1. Back Cut – Scaly cut with a rough texture and mainly used in trimmings.
2. Belly Cut – Highly popular cut due to smooth texture and close, small scale structure which makes it pliable and suitable for many items such as handbags and clothing.

The largest width of the belly is measured to gauge the value of the hide. When designers are purchasing crocodile leather, they must take into consideration the measurements are for the overall size of the hide and not a pattern width. As a result, it can take several skins to produce a single item.

== Treatment after farming and production ==
Development programs were set up to support the growth of crocodile populations during harvest in the 1960s and 1970s in the Americas and Rhodesia. Papua New Guinea put similar management programs in place which made the trading of crocodile skin economically and commercially viable as it prevented over hunting and depletion in numbers. Maintenance of these farms relies on skin-producing countries to export their products elsewhere for tanning and manufacture.

Often, it is impossible to tell if a skin has been preserved adequately until after tanning as there may be no signs of biological damage. A damaged skin resulting in a dull, discolored or scuffed finish which ultimately devalues the leather.

Australian Saltwater Crocodile is one of the most sought after skins because it is flexible which makes it good for handbag production. Bonier hides of Caiman crocodiles are more difficult to dye and work with, making them a less popular option. For items such as bags, suits or trousers, large panels of skin are required. With large areas of leather on display, damaged leather is obvious which is why cautions are taken to ensure high-grade skins come out of the crocodile farms. Small bags require a hide of 30 to 34 cm. Larger bags need skins of 40 to 50 cm. Manufacturers should use the maximum amount of hide to avoid waste. Scraps are used for straps, gussets and interior details. It is necessary for the designer to mark the skin with preparatory sewing lines using a rotatory tool to thin the line where the stitches will run. This reduces the risk of the needle hitting calcium deposits which may break the needle.

It takes an average of two artisan days to make a crocodile skin handbag. Timing depends on the glazing technique used on the hide as certain glazes affect the pliability of the leather, making it stiffer and prone to cracking. Longer, more complicated process is required when the leather has been treated like this as the leather cannot be turned inside out in the traditional way.

== Legalities ==
The crocodile skin trade is legally complicated because it is important that the leather is sourced reliably from farms where crocodiles are treated in humane conditions. Unregulated commercial hunting has resulted in a decline of many crocodile populations so governments have put protection over many reptiles. CITES is an international agreement between 164 countries to protect endangered species from extinction. Established in 1973, it stands for "Convention on International Trade in Endangered Species of wild fauna and flora". Legally imported crocodile skin must come from reputable farms with CITES certification to prove legal possession. Any uncertificated skins are confiscated by customs and sale of an inherited (pre-CITES) or illegally imported skin is a criminal offense.

The laws on crocodile trade are different around the world. In America, it is legal to import sustainably sourced crocodile leather as long as it complies with the restrictions imposed by CITES. Crocodile leather trade for Freshwater Siamese Crocodile with Thailand, Vietnam or Cambodia is forbidden even if the skin is accompanied by a CITES certificate. In certain cases, illegal trade occurs when buyers are unaware of restrictions so companies or businesses purchasing crocodile hide must be sure of the origin of the skin they are purchasing.

== Trade ==
Crocodile leather trade was established in the Caribbean, Mexico and Central America when it became a popular material in the 1800s. Since then, demand for skins has increased to the extent that hunting and production spread to Africa, Asia and Australia, where the majority of crocodile skins are sustainably sourced today.

In the Northern Territory, crocodile farms generate $107 million per year. This is a crucial form of income for a community lacking viable industry. Crocodile farming is valued as providing 264 jobs (2017) as well as encouraging harmony within communities with Indigenous and local people who carry out egg hunting and crocodile rearing.

Crocodile farming is not limited to the production of skins for the fashion industry. Tourism and on-farm breeding help maintain the state of farms and educate the public about the role of crocodile farming in certain communities. In the Northern Territory tourists can visit Crocodylus Park and Crocosaurus Cove to learn about the crocodiles and the trade.

== Conservation ==
Within certain societies, the crocodile trade is extremely important. In 1945–1971 Northern Australians generated significant income at the expense of the crocodile as uncontrolled trade severely impacted the populations of both saltwater and freshwater crocodiles. Full protection over the Australian Saltwater Crocodile was established in 1971 to allow the species to recover. When crocodile numbers increased, co-habitation with local people became a problem, and fatal and non-fatal attacks on people and fishing boats were reported in 1979/1980. In response, the Northern Territory established an 'incentive-driven conservation strategy' which encouraged people to protect crocodiles through commercial activity such as farming, tourism, and ranching. The Saltwater Crocodiles are seen as a commercial resource by communities who generate wealth and employment through the crocodile industry. This also promotes crocodile conservation which would otherwise be difficult because of their predatory nature.

Brands who use crocodile skins are encouraged to support conservation efforts. Australian brand Croc Stock and Barra use unwanted sections of skin to handcraft luxury items and ensure waste is limited. Other brands such as Roje Exotics American Leathers claim to use leather that is the byproduct of the international exotic cuisine industry which also ensures fewer skins are wasted within the system.

== Animal welfare ==
The Management Program within the Northern Territory maintains that the crocodiles are farmed in a humane way. It makes assessments on farming limits and population dynamics to ensure the numbers of Saltwater Crocodile are maintained and never reach the lows of 1972 again.

== See also ==
- Kangaroo industry
- Alligator leather
