= Lim Chu Kang =

Planning Area in North Region, Singapore

- Planning Area

Other transcription(s)
  - Chinese: 林厝港; Líncuògǎng (Pinyin); Lîm-chhù-káng (Hokkien POJ)
  - Malay: Lim Chu Kang
  - Tamil: லிம் சூ காங் Lim cū kāṅ (Transliteration)
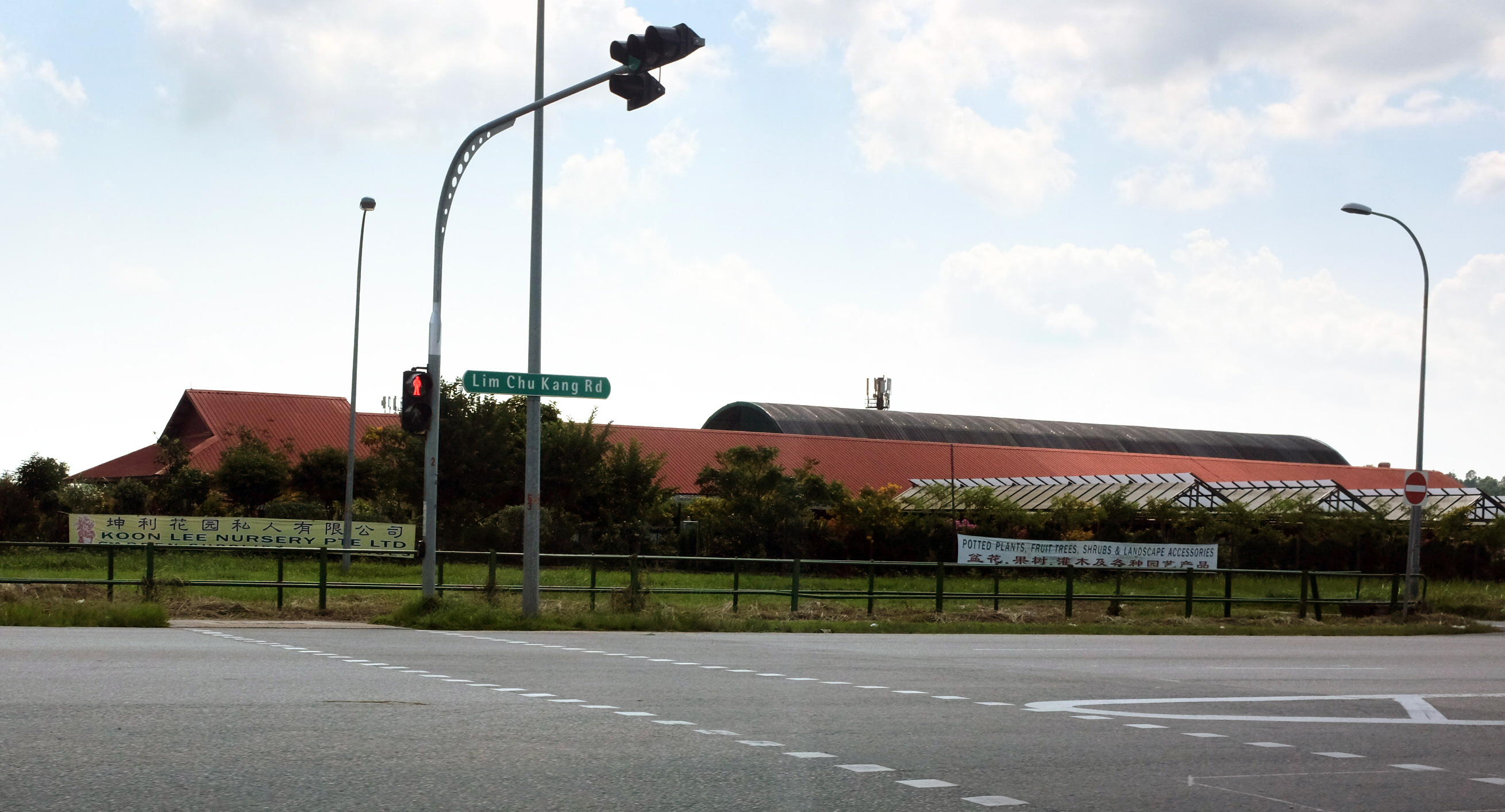
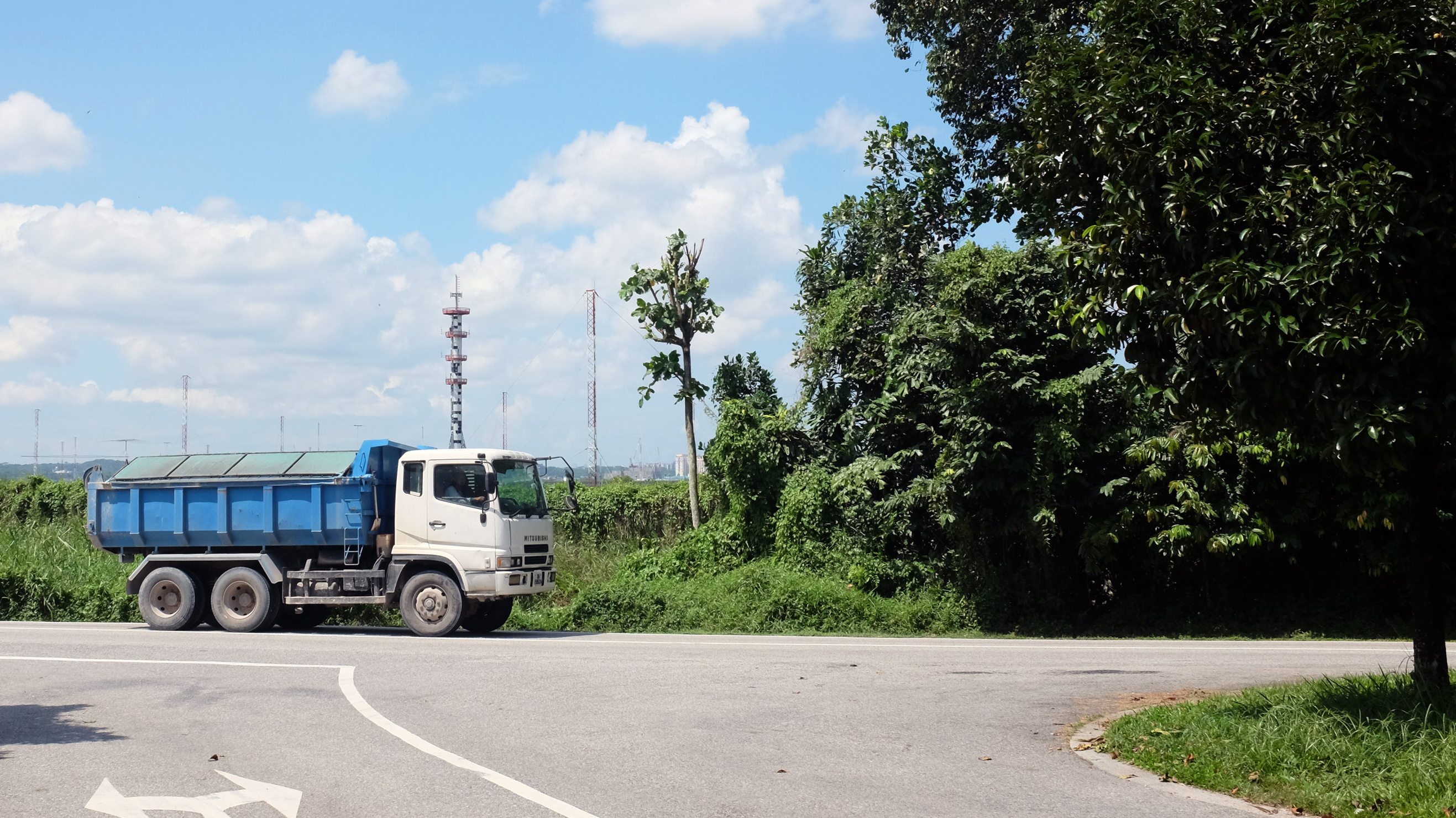
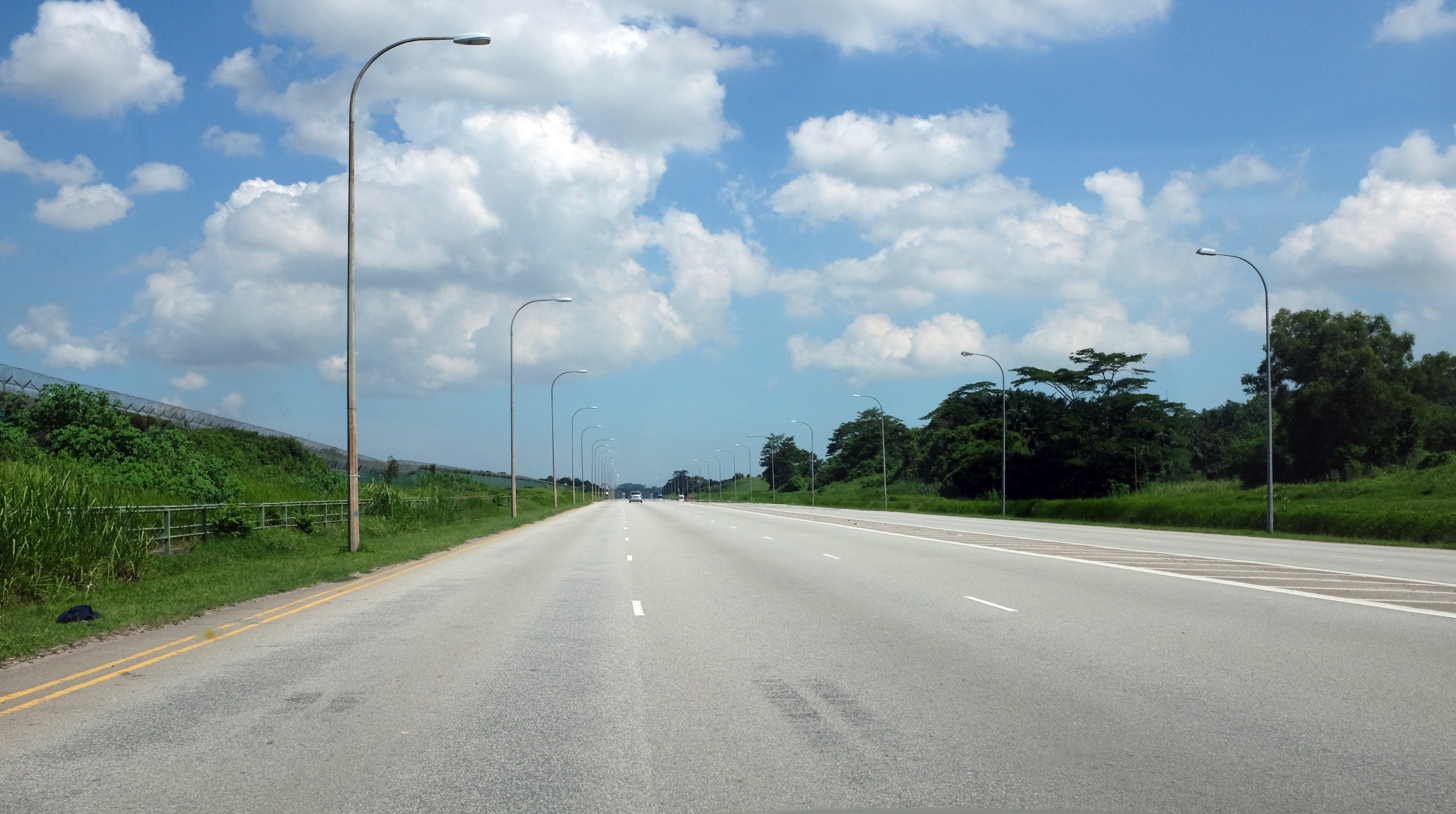
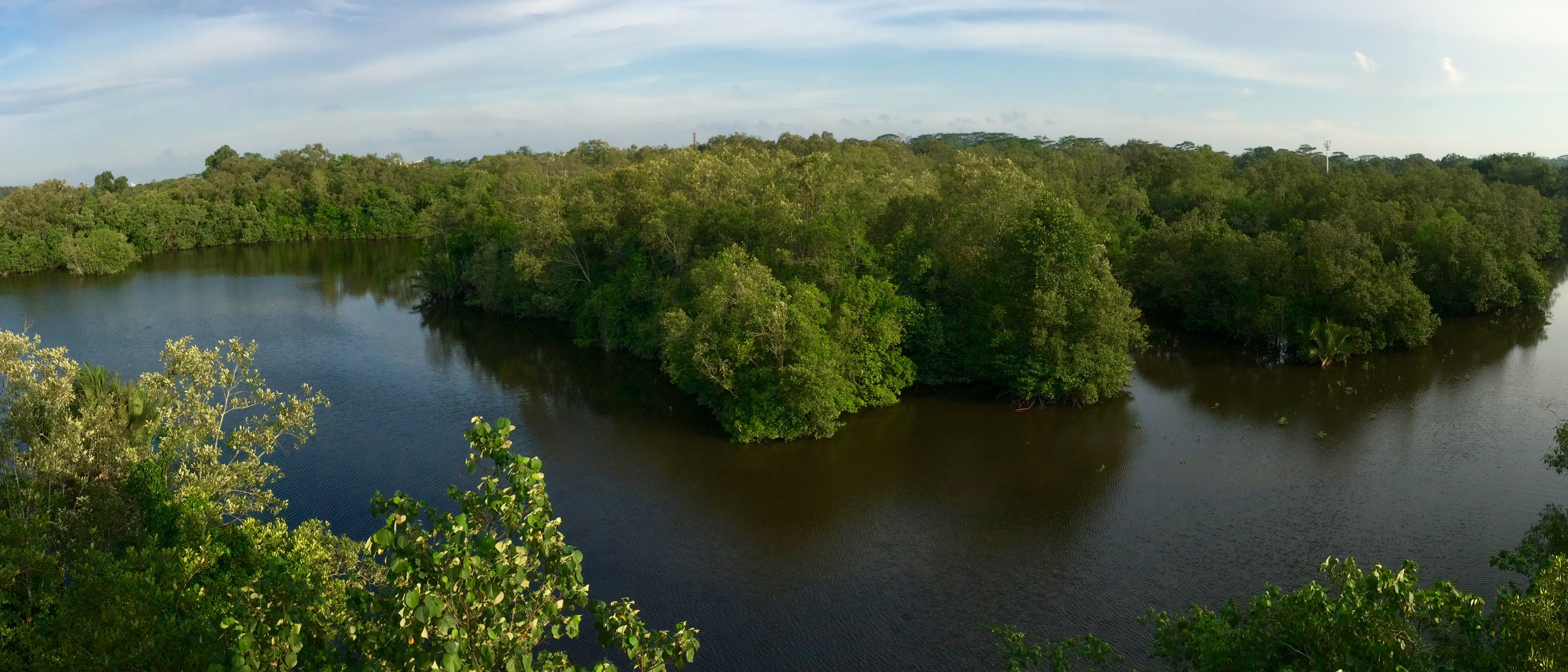
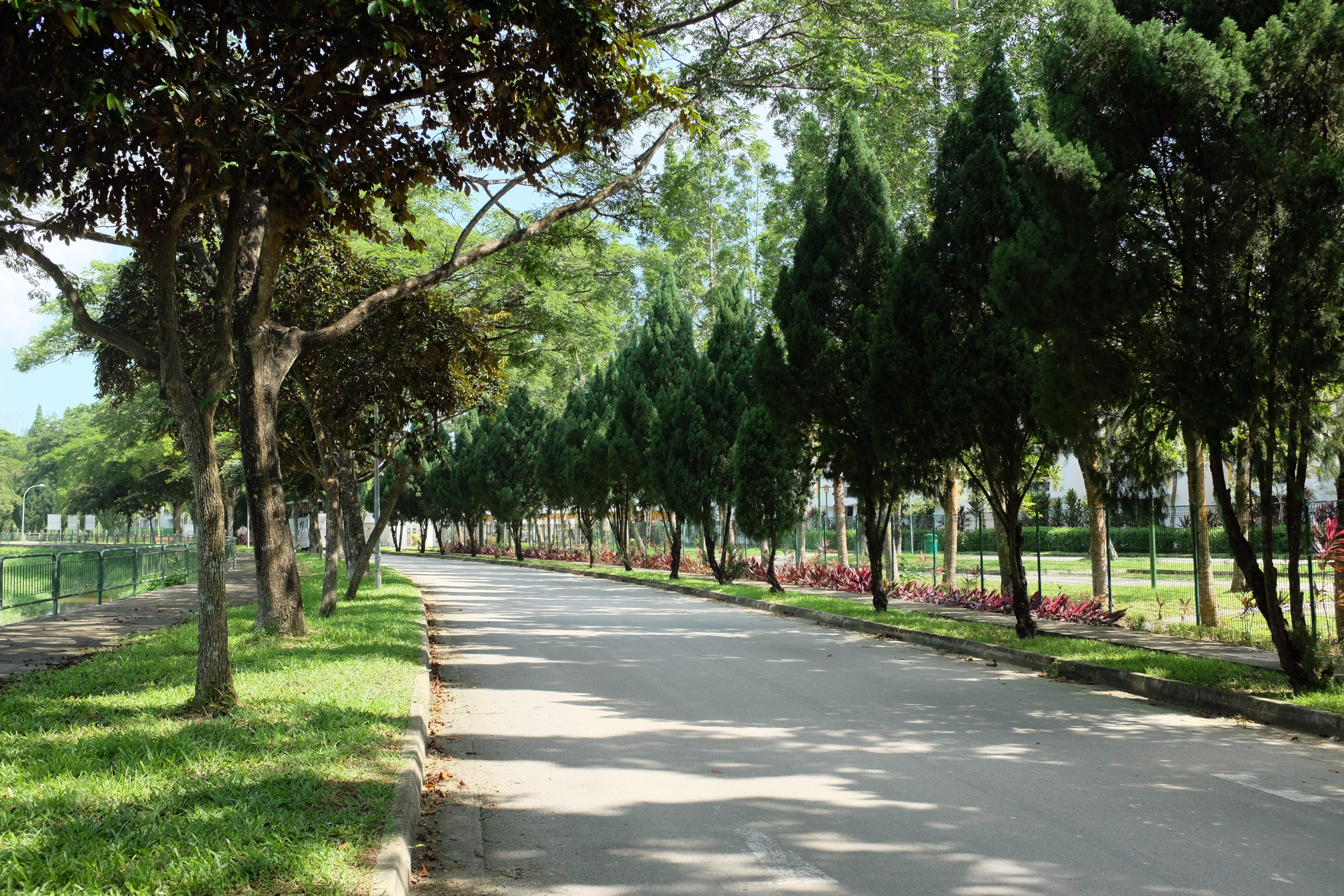
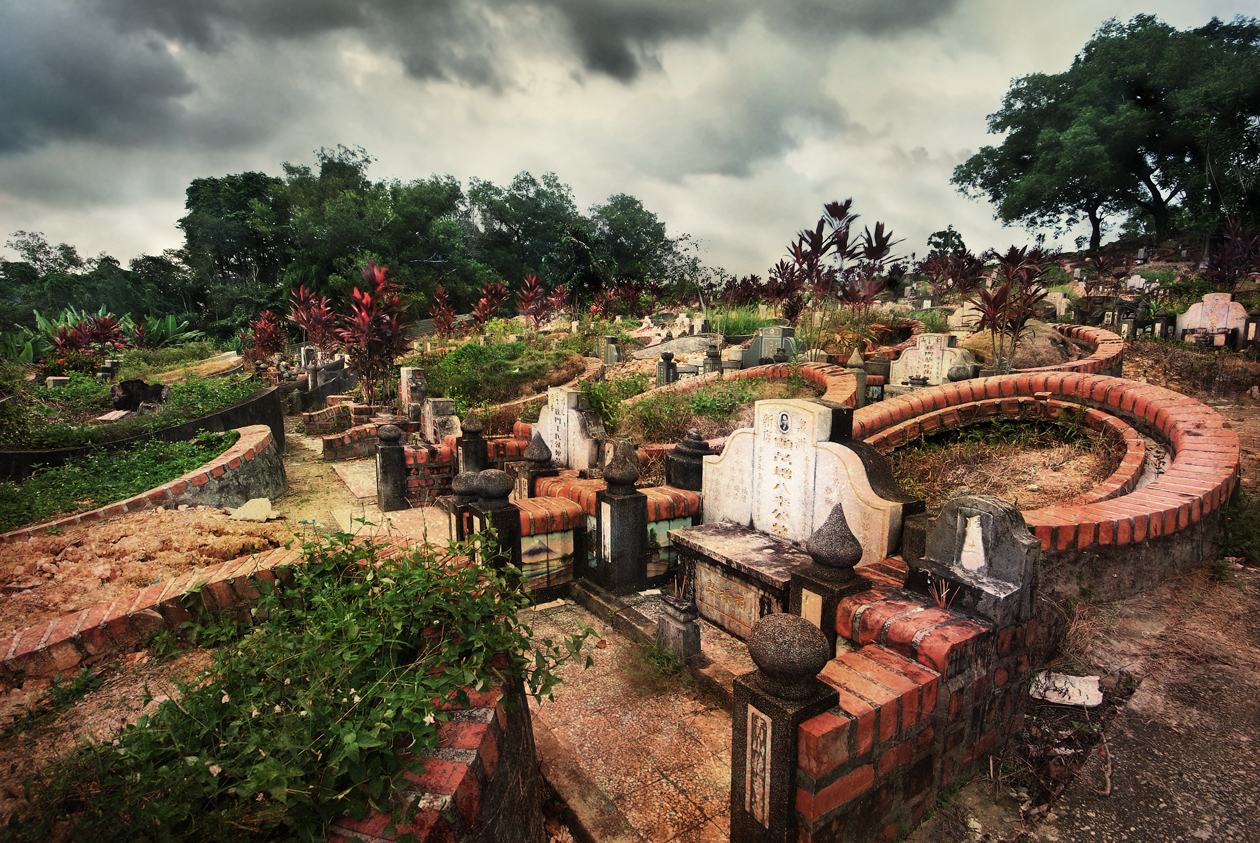
- From top left to right: Koon Lee Nursery, Kranji Transmitting Station, former Lim Chu Kang Road, Sungei Buloh Wetland Reserve, Chinese Cemetery Path 4, gravestones in Choa Chu Kang Chinese Cemetery

- Location of Lim Chu Kang in Singapore

- Location of Lim Chu Kang within Singapore
- Coordinates: 01°25′N 103°42′E
- Country: Singapore
- Region: West Region
- CDC: South West CDC
- Town councils: Chua Chu Kang Town Council
- Constituencies: Chua Chu Kang GRC

Government
  - Mayor: South West CDC: Low Yen Ling
  - Members of Parliament: Chua Chu Kang GRC: Zhulkarnain Abdul Rahim

Area
  - Total: 17.5 km^{2} (6.8 sq mi)
  - Rank: 14th

Population (2026)
  - Total: 20
  - Rank: 47th
  - Density: 1.1/km^{2} (3.0/sq mi)
  - Rank: 47th
- Postal district: 24
- Postal sector: 71

Lim Chu Kang (IPA: /ˈlɪmˈtʃuːˈkɑːŋ/ LIM-choo-KAHNG), often abbreviated as LCK, is a planning area in the North Region of Singapore. It is bordered by the Straits of Johor to the north, the Western Water Catchment to the south and west, and Sungei Kadut to the east.

Lim Chu Kang is one of the few remaining rural areas in Singapore. Unlike most other planning areas, it has remained largely undeveloped and is characterised by agricultural land, forested areas and low-density land use.

The area is home to farms, nurseries, fish hatcheries and livestock facilities that contribute to Singapore's local food production. It has been identified for agri-food development under Singapore's plans to strengthen local food production and improve food resilience.

== History ==
=== Early years ===
Lim Chu Kang Village was founded by Neo Ao Tiew (traditional Chinese: 梁後宙; simplified Chinese: 梁后宙; Pe̍h-ōe-jī: Niô͘ Āu-tiū; 1884 - 1975), a Chinese immigrant from Fujian who was the sheriff of the village. "Lim" was taken from Lim Chwee Chian who was the kangchu, or leader, of the area. The village is on the banks of the Sungei Kranji and was controlled by the Lim clan. Neo Tiew also set up a primary school and health centre in the village. Neo Tiew Road is named after him. The area was originally noted for its numerous pepper and gambier plantations. Later there were rubber plantations, e.g. Namazie-Cashin rubber estates.

=== Japanese occupation of Singapore ===
Lim Chu Kang was one of the locations where the Imperial Japanese Army first landed on the north-western coastline on 8 February 1942 during the Invasion of Singapore of the World War II, catching the defending 22nd Brigade Australian soldiers by surprise. The battle was fought over the night between the Imperial Japanese Army and Australian soldiers, which saw some 360 Australian soldiers killed despite having inflicted heavy casualties on the Japanese soldiers.

=== Ama Keng Village ===
Ama Keng Village (亞媽宮村) was one of the three villages in the Lim Chu Kang, together with Neo Tiew and Sungei Gedong. It takes its name from the Mazu, the goddess of the sea in 1900. In the 1950s, the government developed the bustling farming site to serve as the main food production centre. In 1980s, residents of the Ama Keng were resettled and all eventually moved out to Jurong West, Choa Chu Kang and Yew Tee. After the last resident left, on 10 April 2002, the SAF took possession of the entire Ama Keng for military training use. On 27 September 2012, an SAF serviceman died during training in the camp. After the removal of the military training area in Tengah by 2016, it became the largest training ground for the Lim Chu Kang and Keat Hong camps.

In the 1960s and 1970s, Ama Keng was well-served by shops, a police station as well as a maternity and child welfare centre. All these were closed down by 1990. The Ama Keng English School was founded in 1951 and was moved to Choa Chu Kang in 1990 and renamed to South View Primary School. The old school building became a workers' quarters and military training ground.

=== Ama Keng Chinese Temple ===
The Ama Keng Chinese Temple (亞媽宮) in Lim Chu Kang was built in 1900 to worship Mazu, the holy mother, a goddess of peace and happiness. Ama means "grandmother" in Teochew and Hokkien, and keng means "temple". The "incense ashes" of this temple were brought in from Wak Hai Cheng Bio Temple (粵海清廟), the oldest Teochew temple in Singapore. The first temple was made of attap. The temple was renovated in 1943 with a zinc roof and timber. In 1965, it was redeveloped with a tiled roof, and the renovations cost S$16,000. The temple held wayang performances a few times a year. In the late 1980s, the government acquired the temple's land for military purposes. The temple committee, residents and devotees attempted to petition against the acquisition without success, and the temple was eventually demolished. All of the Ama Keng Road was eventually closed down during COVID-19 pandemic and expunged the road.

=== Neo Tiew ===
Neo Tiew is named after Neo Ao Tiew (梁後宙), a prominent Chinese businessman. Neo is credited with the development of the Lim Chu Kang area, where he built roads, houses and a seaport. He was also the founder and sheriff of Lim Chu Kang Village. In 1967, the British colonial government named a 3.5km stretch of road "Neo Tiew Road" or "Neo Tiew Lane" in recognition of his contributions to the area.

On 17 February 2011, most parts of Neo Tiew became a military training area.

=== Sungei Gedong ===
In the 1960s, Sungei Gedong Road was lined with shophouses and cinemas. A major plan by the government to move residents into HDB flats have seen the decline of the small town. A small HDB estate which was opposite Lim Chu Kang Road was built in the early 1980s, but had been cleared by the late 1990s and expanded the Sungei Gedong Camp's military training area in 2000s.

On 11 July 2001, SAF took possession of the entire Sungei Gedong for military training area.

=== Lim Chu Kang Bus Terminal ===
In the 1980s, Lim Chu Kang Road End Bus Terminal was served by Services 172 (to Shenton Way Bus Terminal and later shortened to loop at Jalan Anak Bukit) and 206 (to Jurong Bus Interchange and later amended to Boon Lay Bus Interchange.)

On 3 January 1993, route 172 was amended to Boon Lay Interchange. On 18 July 1993, new service 175 was introduced from Lim Chu Kang to Upper Bukit Timah Road (Loop) replacing route 206 which was withdrawn. In 2005 service 175 was shortened to Bukit Panjang, amended to loop at the Lim Chu Kang Road End and renumbered service 975. The bus stop is renamed as Police Coast Guard.

=== BBC Far Eastern Relay Station ===
In 1978 the BBC Far Eastern Relay Station began broadcasting radio programmes addressing the largest audiences in Asia of the BBC World Service from Kranji. Closure of the site was announced in July 2023.

== Today ==
Today, Lim Chu Kang is still largely rural and is located in close proximity with the Western Water Catchment. Lim Chu Kang is served by two main roads known as Lim Chu Kang Road and Old Choa Chu Kang Road. As this area is still undeveloped, its land use primarily consists of military training areas, agriculture, farms, the only remaining cemeteries in Singapore (due to exhumations in others to make way for new developments) and a major cinerarium. There are also side-roads, like Jalan Sungei Poyan and Jalan Bahtera.

The area will not be used for residential purposes in the near future or in the Land Use Plan 2030. Rather, it will largely retain its agricultural and military value. In 2017, it was announced that approximately 106 hectares of surrounding land — an area roughly the size of 75 football fields was going to be acquired to make way for the expansion of Tengah Air Base, which will accommodate some of the assets and facilities from Paya Lebar Air Base, scheduled to be vacated and relocated by 2030. Murai Farmway, Murai Urban Training Facility, Ama Keng (entire military training area) and more than 50,000 graves was affected by the acquisition. The SAFTI Live Firing Area boundary was trimmed by 30 per cent. The 62 farms in the western part of Lim Chu Kang was cleared progressively from April 2020 to December 2022, to make way for military training areas. In June 2025, a newly realigned Lim Chu Kang Road was opened to replace the previous route which was decommissioned at the same time to make way for the expansion of the Tengah Air Base.

Various types of farms where sustainable agriculture is practiced such as vegetable, goat and crocodile farms give city dwellers an insight on nature. It has also been an increasingly popular exploration for tourists in recent years, due in part to its close proximity to the Kranji MRT station.

=== Lim Chu Kang Rural Centre ===
In 1979, a Housing Development Board estate was constructed in Neo Tiew. In addition to public housing units, a wet market and an old playground were also constructed in this estate. In 2002, the entire estate was sold back to the government in an en-bloc sale; its residents moved to newly built housing units in Jurong West. The remains of the old housing estate are currently used by the Singapore Armed Forces for their Fighting in Built-Up Areas (FIBUA) training from 2004, which has restricted access and only accessible from the Sungei Gedong Camp (TRMC) Operations Room. In 2012, the site was used for the shooting of a war scene in the film, Ah Boys to Men.

== Agriculture in Lim Chu Kang ==
Agricultural activity in Singapore is primarily concentrated in the Lim Chu Kang area, located in the northwestern region of the country. This district serves as the nation's main agricultural zone, housing a diverse range of farms engaged in food production, aquaculture, and agri-technology.

Despite Singapore's limited land availability, Lim Chu Kang plays a significant role in supporting local food resilience initiatives. The area is home to vegetable farms, egg production facilities, fish farms, and goat farms, many of which employ modern, high-efficiency farming techniques such as vertical farming, hydroponics, and automated systems. These innovations align with Singapore's “30 by 30” goal, which aims to produce 30% of the country's nutritional needs locally by 2030.

The farms in Lim Chu Kang are regulated and supported by the Singapore Food Agency (SFA), which oversees food safety and agricultural development. In recent years, the government has also introduced initiatives to modernize the sector, encouraging sustainable practices and the adoption of agri-tech solutions.

Notable farms in the Lim Chu Kang area include a mix of traditional family-run operations and technologically advanced enterprises, reflecting the broader transformation of Singapore's agricultural landscape.

=== Notable farms ===
Most of Singapore's agricultural industry are concentrated within the Lim Chu Kang area. Below is a list of notable farms located within the area.

Vegetable and crop farms

- Bollywood Farms, an organic farm and educational centre established in 2000, focusing on sustainable agriculture and public outreach. It is known for producing organic vegetables and promoting farm-to-table practices.
- Yili Farm, founded in 1996, this farm specialises in vegetables and mushrooms, supplying local supermarket chains. It combines traditional soil-based farming with modern practices and contributes significantly to local produce supply.
- Fire Flies Health Farm, an organic farm producing a range of leafy vegetables and herbs, known for its environmentally sustainable practices and proximity to natural wetlands.
- Green Circle Eco Farm, a chemical-free farm cultivating a wide variety of crops while emphasising recycling and sustainable resource use.

Livestock and dairy farms

- Hay Dairies Goat Farm, is Singapore's only goat farm, producing fresh goat milk and offering educational farm visits.
- Viknesh Dairy Farm, a family-run dairy farm known for fresh cow milk production and traditional livestock farming practices.

Aquaculture and specialty farms

- Qian Hu Fish Farm, is a major ornamental fish farm that also engages in aquaculture activities and public education through farm tours and workshops.
- Jurong Frog Farm, is Singapore's only commercial frog farm, specialising in the breeding of American bullfrogs for consumption and educational purposes.
- Long Kuan Hung Crocodile Farm, is the last remaining crocodile farm in Singapore, involved in the breeding and processing of saltwater crocodiles for meat and leather products.

== See also ==
- List of Kangchu system placename etymologies
