= Charles Joseph Pemberton Paglar =

Singaporean surgeon and politician (1894–1954)

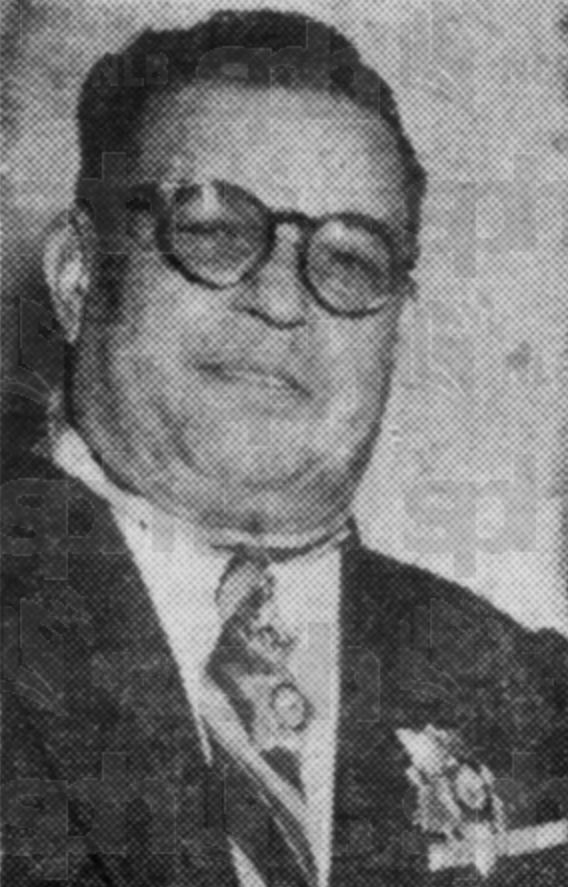
- Paglar in 1951

Member of the Legislative Council for Changi Constituency
- In office 10 April 1951 – 9 December 1954
- Preceded by: Constituency established
- Succeeded by: Lim Cher Kheng (as legislative assemblyman)

Personal details
- Born: 1 September 1894 Alor Gajah, Malacca, Straits Settlements
- Died: 9 December 1954 (aged 60) Singapore General Hospital, Colony of Singapore
- Resting place: Bidadari Cemetery
- Party: Progressive Party
- Spouses: Kathleen Shelley Paglar (m. 1919; div. 1940) Mani Lim Geok Neo (after 1940) Baby Quek (until 1947) Emily (m. 1947)
- Children: 5
- Relatives: Rex Shelley (nephew)

Dato Dr. Charles Joseph Pemberton Paglar (1 September 1894 – 9 December 1954) was a Singaporean surgeon, gynaecologist, politician, philanthropist, and leader of the Eurasian community of Singapore. He was the personal physician and a close friend of Sultan Ibrahim of Johor. During the Japanese occupation, he was appointed the head of the Eurasian Welfare Association, which had been established by the Japanese. This led to his indictment of treason by the British following the end of the occupation. However, the case was later withdrawn and he was acquitted of all charges.

It is believed that, not long after he was acquitted, Paglar successfully convinced Sultan Ibrahim to support the formation of the United Malays National Organisation (UMNO) in May 1946. For his service to the Sultan, he received the Order of the Crown of Johor. Paglar successfully ran for the Changi seat of the Legislative Council of Singapore in 1951. He served in various positions in several boards, clubs and associations, and was a prominent sports patron. Thousands attended his funeral in December 1954.

== Early life and education ==
Paglar was born in Alor Gajah, Malacca on 1 September 1894 to a British father from Wigan and an Indian mother. Orphaned at a young age, he was adopted by Alexander John Francis Paglar, a prominent Eurasian businessman in Malacca of German descent. He received his early education at a convent in Penang. He later returned to Malacca and began attending the St. Francis' Institution. He began attending the King Edward VII College of Medicine in Singapore after receiving the Diamond Jubilee Scholarship.

== Career ==
After graduating from college in 1917, he remained in Singapore and began working at the Singapore General Hospital as an assistant house surgeon. He served as the medical staff sergeant of the field ambulance unit of the Military Hospital on Pulau Blakang Mati, now known as Sentosa, during World War I. In the 1920s, he set up a private practice in Joo Chiat and established the Paglar Pharmacy on North Bridge Road. In 1926, he left for Edinburgh to study at the Royal College of Surgeons. He graduated with an honours in surgery and midwifery in the following year. He did post-graduate work in Java, Syria, France and England. He also did post-graduate work in gynaecology in Germany, Scotland and Lebanon. He was made the personal physician of Sultan Ibrahim of Johor in 1930 after curing an illness that had left the latter bedridden for several months. He advised the Sultan on the planning and construction of the General Hospital in Johor Bahru. Another client of his was prominent businessman Ong Boon Tat. He was struck off the medical register for "professional misconduct" by the local medical council in 1932. In July 1933, he appealed the decision but was rejected by the Supreme Court. However, he was reinstated on 28 November 1934 following a successful appeal with the General Medical Council in London. He then established the Paglar Surgery on Coleman Street and the Paglar Clinic and Maternity Hospital on Joo Chiat Place. The hospital eventually became the Parkway East Hospital.

In 1937, he accompanied Sultan Ibrahim at the Coronation of King George VI, during which he received the King George VI Coronation Medal, and attended the Afternoon Garden Party at Buckingham Palace. In September 1938, he resigned as the Sultan's personal physician, but stated that he was "always ready to go back to His Highness" if the Sultan was in need of his services. He was also a founding member of the Family Benefit Society. He began volunteering with the Medical Auxiliary Service (MAS) in 1939. In the days before Singapore fell to the Japanese, he was the surgeon-in-charge at the MAS-operated Yock Eng Depot and Casualty Station emergency hospital on Tanjong Katong Road, which was housed in the Yeok Eng School. While there, he provided free treatment for war victims in Tanjong Katong. His daughter Ethel helped ferry casualties to the hospital before being evacuated to Australia with her husband, Stanley Lee, a Royal Naval Reserve officer. Although Paglar could afford to evacuate, he chose to stay in Singapore to look after his patients.

=== Japanese occupation ===
Following the fall of Singapore to the Japanese, Paglar was made the president of the Japanese-controlled Eurasian Welfare Association. This made him a polarising figure within the local Eurasian community as some began to see him as a "collaborator of the enemy." As the association's president, he was involved in the resettlement of local Eurasians to the failed Bahau settlement. At Emperor Hirohito's birthday celebration, he made a speech in support of the Japanese. He also served as the director of the MAS during the occupation. He made several personal contributions to the Bahau Fund for the Bahau settlement. He frequently gave public speeches in support of the Japanese. On 7 December 1943, the Japanese appointed him the Eurasian Representative of the Consultative Council. During the war, he obtained medical supplies through his friendship with Mamoru Shinozaki, as well as his Japanese patients, which he used to treat local patients. He also made nearly weekly unescorted trips to the Bahau settlement, travelling through Guerilla-controlled roads, to deliver medical supplies. A cousin of his, Donald Paglar, accompanied him on several of these trips as his assistant.

==== Arrest and trial ====
On 8 September, Paglar, along with 97 other suspected collaborators with the Japanese in Malaya, including leader of the Chinese community in Singapore Lim Boon Keng, Selangor Supreme Court Judge Yong Shook Lin and the president of the Japanese-established Oversea Chinese Association, Choo Kia Peng, were arrested by the British. Although several of the detained, including Lim, were released in December and January, Paglar remained in police custody for preliminary inquiries. He was incarcerated at the Outram Road Prison. Commissioner J. C. Cobbett announced on 24 December that he had gathered enough evidence to bring a charge of Treason against Paglar. A Preliminary Inquiry was to be held from 16 to 18 January 1946. During the inquiry, all of the prosecution witnesses, including Shinozaki, had spoken in Paglar's defence. However, Cobbett announced that he believed that Paglar had a case to meet and that he would frame a charge. He also rejected a bail offer of $2,000,000, which was contributed to by members of the Chinese, Indian and Arab communities of Singapore.

Paglar was committed to stand trial on a charge of treason before the Supreme Court. He appeared in court on 30 January and declared that he was "not guilty" of the charges against him However, another attempt to obtain a bail was rejected. His trial began on 13 February. He claimed trial and the case was adjourned to 16 March, and he was granted bail with two sureties of $10,000. The case was later adjourned sine die. He reappeared at the Supreme Court on 23 March, where he was acquitted of all charges. On the same day, the treason cases against lawyer S. C. Goho and journalist Abdul Samad bin Haji Ismail were also withdrawn.

=== Post-war career ===
Following the occupation, Paglar reopened his clinic. While he was still incarcerated, he continued to treat patients in his clinic, and a 'court' had to be set up there as he was unable to attend regular court due to his work in the clinic. Not long after his acquittal, he was approached by Dato Onn Jaafar, who was looking to establish the United Malays National Organisation (UMNO) in opposition Malayan Union. Jaafar hoped that Paglar would persuade Sultan Ibrahim to support the formation of the UMNO. Paglar was apparently successful as the UMNO formed in May at the Pan-Malayan Malay Congress in Johor Bahru. He was given the sixth membership badge of the UMNO. In August 1946, he ran for the position of president of the Singapore Recreation Club but lost to Dr. W. A. Balhetchet, the former Medical Officer in charge of Tan Tock Seng Hospital. However, following Balhetchet's retirement due to ill health, Paglar was appointed the club's president, a position which he continued to hold until his death in December 1954. He received the Order of the Crown of Johor for his service to the sultanate, and was conferred the title of Dato’ Paduka Mahkota Johor. In the early 1950s, he became a founding member of the Adult Education Board, and established a vernacular school on Wing Loong Road to serve the local Tamil population. He also built a mosque in Punggol to serve the Malay villages in the area and was involved in founding both the Yio Chu Kang Youth Club and the Katong Boys' Club, which he hoped would prevent youths from becoming "loafers". In 1948, he served as the vice-president of the Singapore Boy Scouts Association. He served as the association's president from 1949 to 1951. In 1950, he was made a justice of the peace. He also served as the director of the Chinese YMCA and the vice-president of the Eurasian Association and the China Society.

Paglar was also a prominent sports patron. He supported the Singapore Table Tennis Association, the Singapore Amateur Boxing Association, the Singapore Amateur Weight Lifting Federation and the St John Brigade, and helped fund the construction of a badminton hall on Guillemard Road. He served as the president of the hall's Fund Committee. He served as the vice-president of the Singapore Olympic and Sports Council. He was also a supporter of the Malayan Football Association. In 1951, he was elected the president of the Singapore Amateur Athletic Association. In October 1953, when the Singaporean table tennis team was unable to pay for return passages to Singapore from Tokyo, Paglar donated $1,000 to the team.

In August 1951, he arrived in Manila on a three-week visit to the Philippines and began giving local doctors and officials conferences on tuberculosis. While on the trip, he also visited local hospitals and tuberculosis sanatoriums to study the local methods of combatting tuberculosis. He also met with local scout officials. In the same year, he became a member of the Order of the Brotherhood of St. John of Jerusalem. In 1953, he attended the Coronation of Queen Elizabeth II, making him the first Malayan to have been present at the crowning of two British monarchs. During the coronation, he also received the Queen Elizabeth II Coronation Medal. In 1954, he received both the Brotherhood of Saint John of Jerusalem Long Service Medal and the Boys Scout Organizations Medal of Merit. He was the deputy leader of the Singapore contingent to the 1954 Asian Games. He was also a founding member and the president of the Singapore People's Education Association.

==== Political career ====
Paglar contested the Municipal North-East Constituency seat of the Legislative Council in the 1948 Singaporean general election as an independent. He stated that he would "champion the cause of the poor and fight for the welfare of Eurasians", support an income tax based on an "equitable rate", provide better housing for the poor, tackle the tuberculosis problem and support the introduction of a state lottery. He came in fourth, behind Mohamed Javad Namazie, John Laycock and M. K. Chidambaram and ahead of R. C. H. Lim, V. P. Abdullah and Lim Chuan Geok, with 13.0% of the votes.

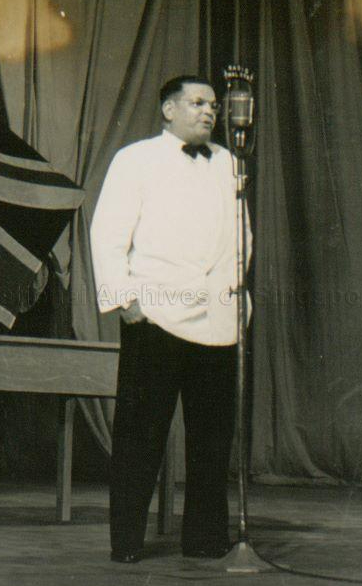
Paglar speaking during the 1951 general election.

Paglar joined the Progressive Party and was elected a member of the Legislative Council of Singapore in the 1951 Singaporean general election representing the Changi district. He continued to serve in this position until his death in 1954. As a legislative councillor, he often came to the aid of squatters who were to be evicted. In July, he criticised the government's decision to evict 20,000 Kampong residents, mainly squatters and farmers, and providing them with compensation but not alternative land and accommodation, calling it "sabotage" and stating that it would destroy the colony's "rice bowl". The evicted were from various communities across Singapore, including Kampong Chantek in Bukit Timah, Kampong Amber near Katong, Geylang Serai, Kampong Siglap and Pulau Tekong Kechil. He and Dr. W. J. Vickers, then the Director of Medical Services in Singapore, were previously successful in giving the residents an extension of the time for the eviction. He later suggested that the evicted be resettled in large plots of unused land in Changi, and stated that the cultivation of alternatives to rice, such as millet, should be encouraged. In February 1952, he established a committee with 180 squatter families who had been evicted from their homes in Yio Chu Kang. The committee aimed to arrange a settlement with the Serangoon Garden Estate Company, who were then the owners of the land. Most families wished to settle around the property or to be provided with alternative accommodation. In March, he urged the government to set up a committee consisting of one Land Officer, one Social Welfare representative, one member of the Chinese Secretariat, three to four members of the District Committee and a representative of the Legislative Council to investigate the position of the squatters in Yio Chu Kang. In September 1953, he criticised the government's decision to resettle squatters in Bedok without testing to see if the land there was suitable for food production, calling it a "wastage of public funds", as many of the resettled claimed that the land in Bedok was unsuitable for food production.

In July 1951, he urged the government to build a sanatorium to house tuberculosis patients. In March 1952, he suggested that the elections law be amended such that only those born within the colony should be allowed to run for a seat in the council. In July, he urged the government to register all opium addicts within the colony and to provide them with the drug on a diminishing scale. He advocated for the establishment of a clinic to take care of opium addicts in August. In February 1954, he was part of a select committee which sought to amend the Land Acquisition Bill to introduce a ten per cent tax on landlords for all land sales. He had previously spoken out against landlords who were using questionable methods of evicting residents. He advocated for the lowering of income tax for philanthropists, and the exemption of all contributions to charities from tax. He also advocated for lowering the cost of rice in the colony to the cheapest possible price. He advocated for the provision of "prompt and sufficient relief" to farmers who had been affected by a major flood in Bedok in October 1954. From 1948 to 1951, he advocated for the introduction of a state lottery, believing it to be an efficient way to fund various social welfare, education and medical plans and other public services within the colony, citing the success of the New South Wales state lotteries as evidence. He also suggested that the government allow people across British Malaya to participate in the Federation of Malaya state lottery as tickets for the lottery were not selling as quickly as initially expected. He pushed for the introduction of a minimum wage.

== Personal life and death ==
Paglar married four times and had five children. He married his first wife, Kathleen Shelley Paglar, in January 1919, and she gave birth to their first daughter in December of that year. They adopted their second daughter in June 1937. She filed for divorce in August 1940, accusing him of committing adultery. After their divorce, she moved to Sumatra, where she was incarcerated by the Japanese. He obtained her release, after which she lived with him and his family in Joo Chiat for a while before moving elsewhere. He also spent a year obtaining the release of Sandy Hope, a friend of his. Following his release, Paglar made Hope his personal secretary, thus providing the latter with protection from the Kempeitai. He had two sons and three daughters, including Renée Paglar, a dancer who was frequently featured by the Japanese during the occupation. He married his fourth wife, Emily, in 1947 when she was 24. She was a nurse at his clinic and regularly visited him when he was being held at Outram Prison. Prominent Eurasian novelist Rex Shelley was his nephew.

Paglar's hobbies included hunting, and he frequently went abroad on hunting trips. On several occasions, he arranged hunting parties in response to reports of tiger sightings in Singapore. He also owned a bungalow in Pulau Ubin. He was a close friend of Sultan Ibrahim, who frequently referred to him as "Charlie" and consulted him on matters unrelated to medicine.

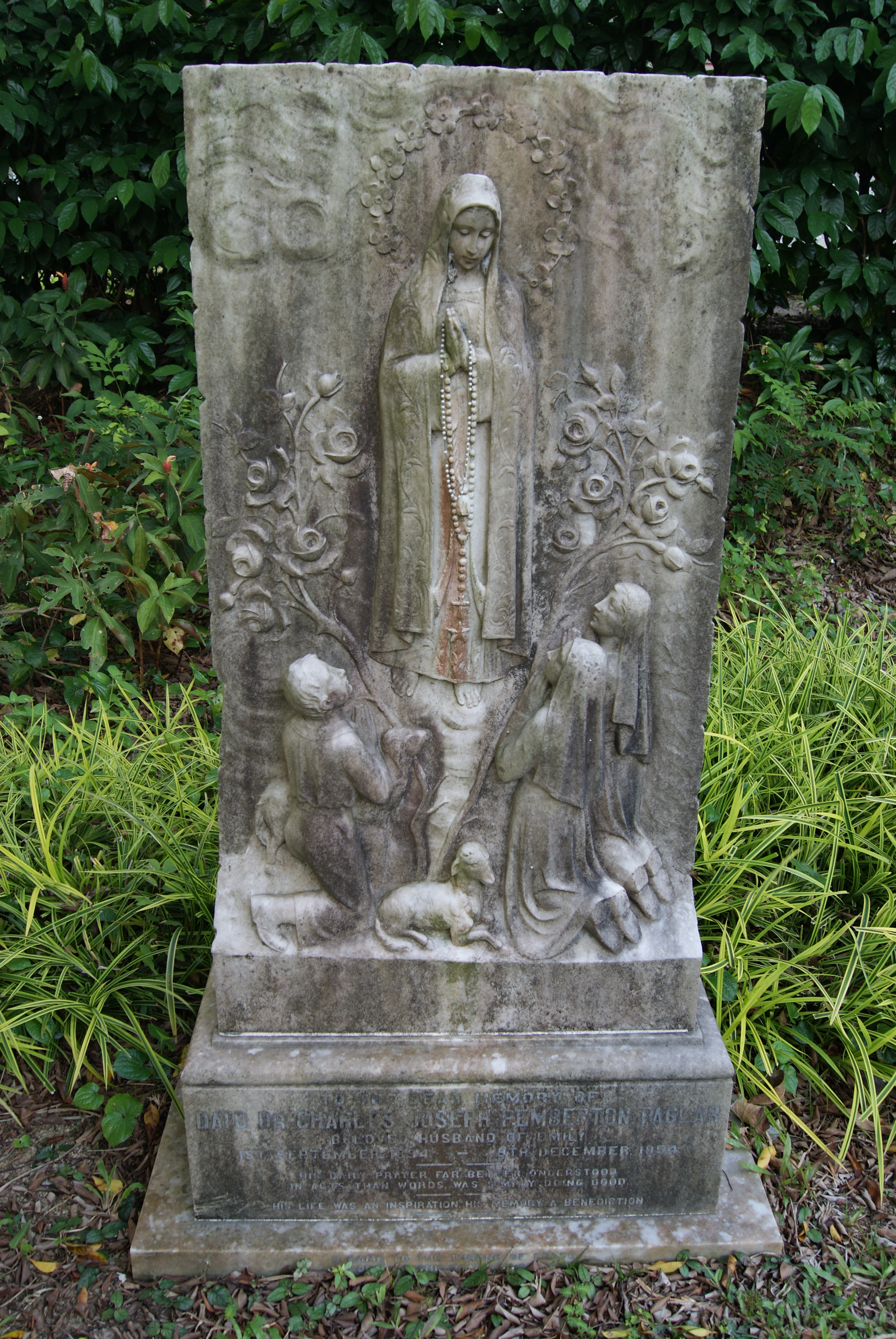
Paglar's gravestone

Paglar died of a heart attack in his sleep on 9 December 1954 at the Singapore General Hospital, two days after he had suffered a stroke. His funeral, which was held at the Bidadari Cemetery on 12 December, was attended by more than 4,000 people. William Goode, Colonial Secretary of Singapore, was present at the funeral, where he gave a speech on the behalf of then Governor of Singapore John Fearns Nicoll.

His family received messages of condolences from Nicoll, President of the City Council of Singapore T. P. F. McNiece, business magnate Loke Wan Tho, city councillors Yap Pheng Geck and Philip Williams, legislative councillors Lim Yew Hock, H. J. C. Kulasingha, Thio Chan Bee, C. F. Smith and C. R. Dasaratha Raj, war heroine Elizabeth Choy, acting-Director of Commerce and Industry J. B. Clegg, Director of Medical Services R. H. Bland and Commissioner of Police Nigel G. Morris. Also present were the Tengku Mahkota of Johor, several state officials of Johor, various representatives of the Eurasian community of Singapore, Dato Syed Ahmad bin Mohammad Alsagoff representing Sultan of Pahang Abu Bakar, senior police officers and members of the Johor Military Forces, Director of Education R. M. Young, representatives of various sports organisations and the leaders of seven countries participating taking part in the Third Asian Table Tennis Games. Over 400 wreaths were placed at the funeral. The cortège, which included buses, cars and hundreds of people travelling on foot, was reportedly 3 km long. Members of the legislative council wore black ties to a council meeting on 14 December in honour of him. On 6 August 1955, the Singapore Boy Scouts Association opened the Paglar Cabin at the Jurong Park Scout Camp, named in memory of Paglar.

His son, Eric, began collecting information for a biography of Paglar but died in 2005 without completing the manuscript. Shelley began writing the biography in 2008 but died in August 2009, leaving the final chapter unfinished. The book was then completed by other relatives of Paglar, as well as several members of the Eurasian Association. On 18 January 2010, the biography, titled Dr Paglar: Everyman's Hero, was launched by President of Singapore S. R. Nathan at the Eurasian House in Tanjong Katong. Emily, then 87 years old and living in Perth, was present at the book launch.
