= A River of Roses =

1998 novel by Rex Shelley

- Author: Rex Shelley
- Language: English
- Publisher: Times Book International
- Publication date: 1998
- ISBN: 981-204-772-7 (first edition)

A River of Roses is the fourth novel by Singaporean Eurasian writer Rex Shelley, first published in 1998 by Times Book International. The novel was awarded the Dymocks Singapore Literature Prize in 2000.

== Plot summary ==
The novel is a saga about four generations of the Eurasian Rosario family, who have Malay and Portuguese blood in them. ("Rosario" is Portuguese for "rosary", or rosa, i.e., "rose" and rio, i.e. "river", which form the title.) It follows the exploits of Alfonso Rosario, an illiterate fisherman born in 1870 who was later promoted to be the Regidor of a Malayan village. The novel then moves on to his grandchildren Antonio and Philippa, who shift from Malacca to Singapore. Finally it ends in 1966–7, when his great-grandson Ignatius Rosario enrolls in the country's first junior college and is then enlisted into the first intake of Singapore's military National Service. Some characters from his earlier novels re-appear as minor characters in this instalment, for example Vicky Viera from Island in the Centre, and Gus Perera and Ah Keh from People of the Pear Tree.
