= Kampong =

Term for Southeast Asian traditional village

A kampong (this term is in Za'aba Spelling, kampung in modern Malay) is a type of village in Austronesian Southeast Asia, including Brunei, Indonesia, Malaysia, Philippines and Singapore. The term applies to traditional villages, especially of the indigenous peoples living in this region.

This term has also been used to refer to urban slum areas or enclosed developments and neighborhoods within towns and cities. The design and architecture of traditional kampong villages have been targeted for reform by urbanists and modernists. These villages have also been adapted by contemporary architects for various projects.

== Etymology ==
The word kampung or kampong is derived from Malay and is commonly translated into English as "village". In Singapore, the traditional spelling kampong continues to be used, while the spelling kampung is standard in Malaysia and Indonesia. In Brunei, both spellings are interchangeable.

The English word "compound," when referring to a development in a town, is thought to be derived from kampong.

== Brunei ==
In Brunei, the term kampong (also kampung) primarily refers to the third- and lowest-level subdivisions below districts (Malay: daerah) and mukim (subdistricts). Some kampong divisions are villages in a social sense as defined by anthropologists, while others may only serve for census and other administrative purposes. Others have been incorporated into the city limits of the capital, Bandar Seri Begawan, or into nearby towns.

A kampong is generally led by a ketua kampung or village head. Infrastructure-wise, it typically has a primary school and a balai raya or dewan kemasyarakatan, the equivalent of a community centre. Because many kampongs have predominantly Muslim residents, each may also have a mosque for the Jumu'ah or Friday prayers and a school providing the Islamic religious primary education compulsory for Muslim pupils in the country.

In Brunei, kampong and kampung are considered to be correct spellings, and both alternatives are common in written media and official place names. For example, Keriam, a village in Tutong District, is known as Kampung Keriam by the Survey Department but Kampong Keriam by the Postal Services Department, both being government departments.

== Cambodia ==
The term kampong, although widely used in Cambodia, is only used in the matter above in regards to settlements by the Chams. The most notable example is Kampong Cham.

== Indonesia ==
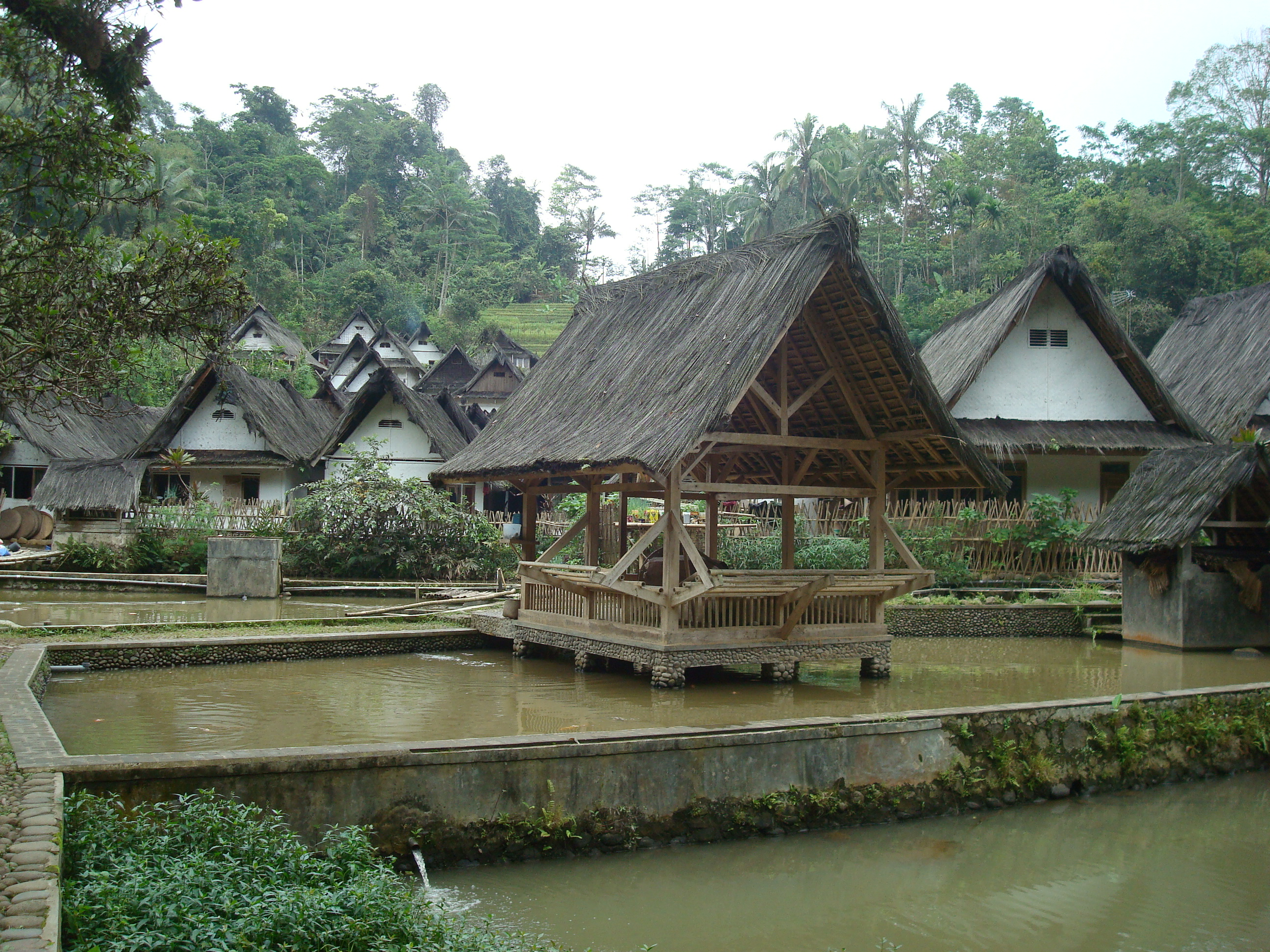
Traditional houses and pond pavilion of Kampung Naga, a traditional Sundanese village in West Java, Indonesia.

In Indonesia, kampung generally refers to a hamlet, which is considered the opposite of the Indonesian kota ("city" in English). However, most Indonesian cities and towns initially consisted of a collection of kampung settlements. There are four typologies of kampung. They are: inner city kampung, which has very high density and is inhabited by 100,000 people per square kilometer; mid-city kampung, which is inhabited by 20,000–40,000 people per square kilometer; rural kampung, which has very low density; and squatter kampung, where people are scattered in metropolitan areas.

Kampung also usually refers to a settlement or compound of a certain ethnic community, which later became incorporated into a place name. Some examples include: the Kampung Melayu district in East Jakarta; Kampung Bugis (Buginese village); Kampung Cina (also known as Pecinan), which refers to a Tionghoa village or could be equivalent to Chinatown as well; Kampung Ambon (Ambonese village); Kampung Jawa (Javanese village); and Kampung Arab (Arab village).

On the island of Sumatra and its surrounding islands, the indigenous peoples have distinctive architecture and building features, including longhouses and rice storage buildings in their kampungs. Malays, Karo, Batak, Toba, Minangkabau, and others build communal housing and tiered structures.

The term kampung in Indonesia could refer to a business-based village as well—for example, Kampung Coklat (lit. "the Chocolate village") in Blitar, East Java, which mainly produces and sells chocolate products (bars, candies, powders, coffee, cocoa butter, etc.) from the local cacao farmers; Kampung Seni (lit. "the Arts/Performances village") in various places across Indonesia where local artisans make and sell their crafts; and Kampung Batik (lit. "the Batik village") which mainly produce and sell batik, offering batik-making courses and training. In 2009, several Kampung Batik, in collaboration with the other official entities such as the Batik Museum in Pekalongan, Central Java, were recognized by UNESCO regarding the "Education and training in Indonesian Batik intangible cultural heritage for elementary, junior, senior, vocational school and polytechnic students" as part of the Masterpiece of Oral and Intangible Heritage of Humanity in Register of Good Safeguarding Practices List. The kampungs in Indonesia have attracted global tourists as well, such as Kampung Panglipuran in Bali, which was awarded as one of the world's cleanest villages in 2016.

== Malaysia ==
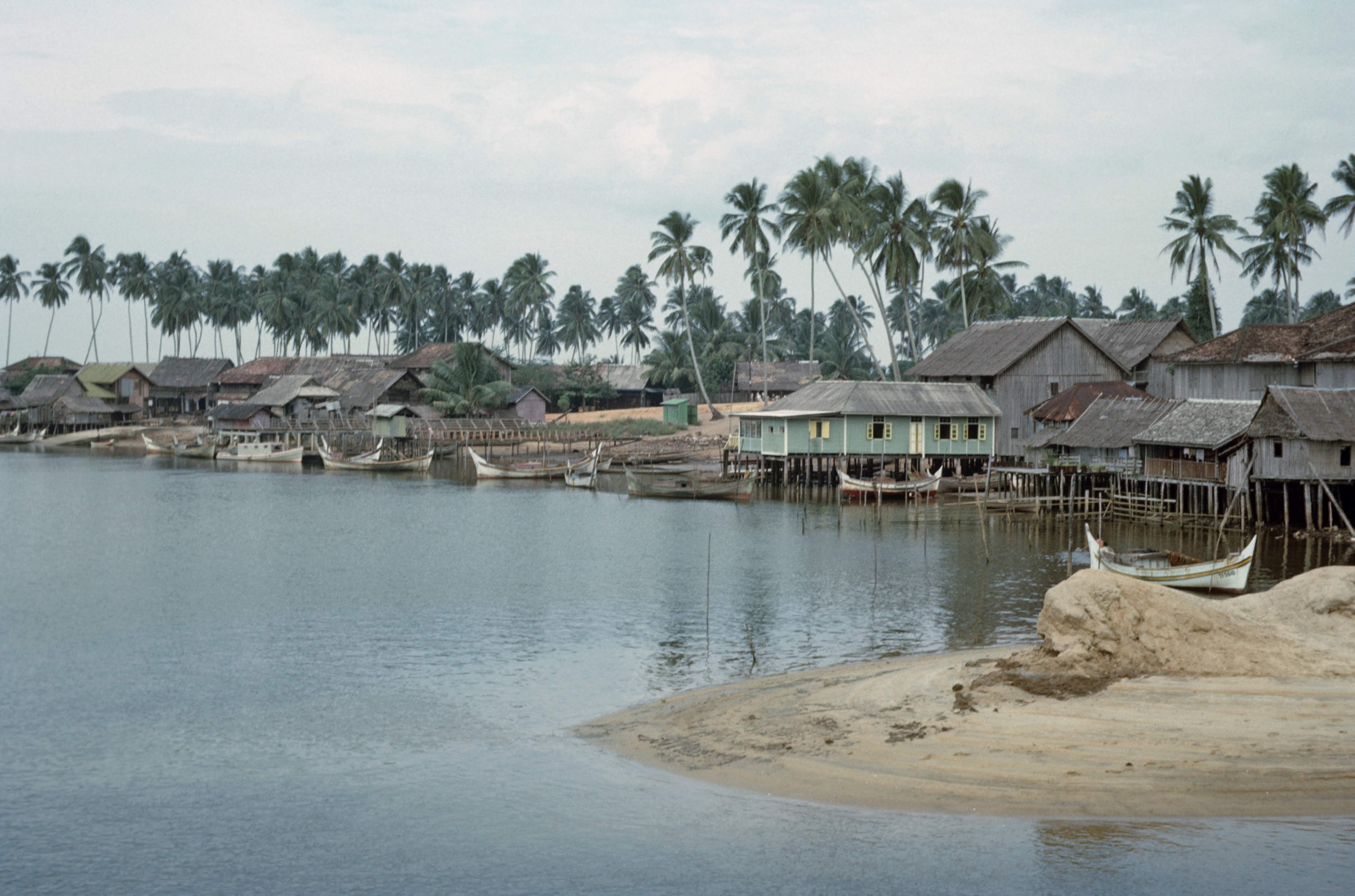
Riverside kampung on the road from Kuantan to Dungun in 1964.

In Malaysia, a kampung is defined as a locality with 10,000 or fewer people. Since historical times, every Malay village has operated under the leadership of a penghulu (village chief), who has the power to hear civil matters in his village (see Courts of Malaysia for more details). A Malay village typically contains a mosque or surau, paddy fields or orchards, and wooden Malay houses on stilts. It is common to see a cemetery near the mosque. Dirt roads are more common than paved roads for village people to travel between kampongs.

The British introduced the Kampung Baru ("New Village") programme as a means of encouraging Malays to adapt to urban life. This is distinct from the new villages established for the Chinese population under the Briggs Plan in 1950, which functioned as internment camps intended to separate suspected Malayan National Liberation Army (MNLA) guerillas of the Malayan Communist Party (MCP) from their rural civilian supporters during the Malayan Emergency.

Malaysia's long-serving prime minister Mahathir Mohamad lauded urban lifestyles in his 1970 book The Malay Dilemma and associated kampong village life with "backward traditionalism". He also had the kampung setinggan (squatter settlements) cleared and new buildings constructed to house their residents in proper housing.

== Philippines ==
In the Philippines, especially in the southern part which is dominated by Moro Muslims, the word kampung was also adopted, but in a Hispanized form, becoming campo. This name itself was originally the influence of the Malayanized Muslim powers that had triumphed in the south of the Philippines, such as the Sultanate of Sulu, Sultanate of Maguindanao, Sultanate of Buayan, and Sultanates of Lanao. Especially the Sultanate of Sulu, because it is close to the spread of Malay culture, its influence is very noticeable, in terms of vocabulary, in this case the word kampung. An example of a place called kampung is a barangay in Zamboanga City, namely Campo Islam or Kampung Islam (lit. 'Islamic Village').

== Singapore ==
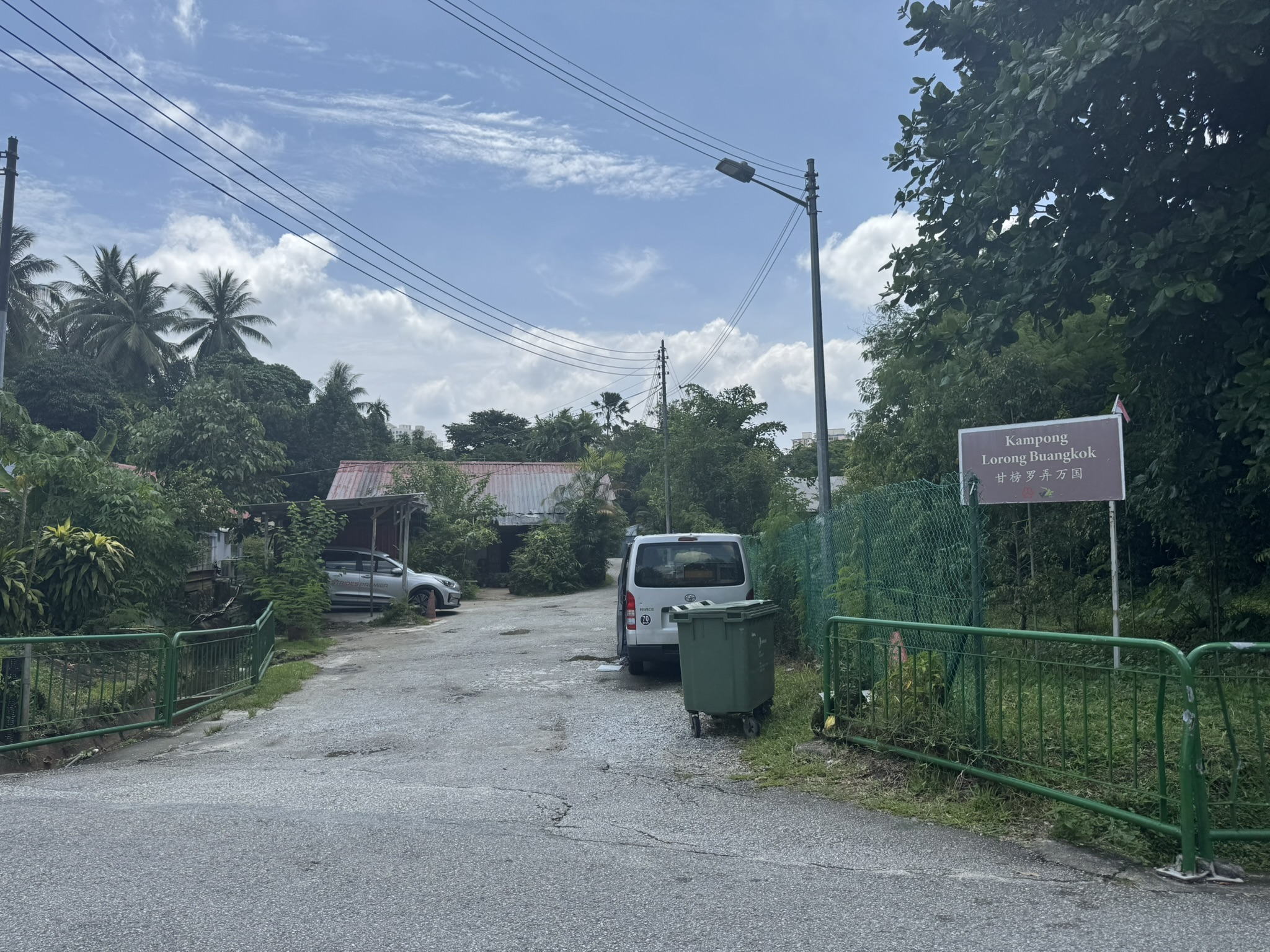
Entrance to Kampong Lorong Buangkok

Traditional kampongs were once widespread across Singapore, but few survive today, mainly on outlying islands such as Pulau Ubin. During the 20th century, many kampongs were located on the mainland. These kampongs were often overcrowded and considered unhealthy and unpleasant places to live, with numerous kampongs lacking proper sanitation.

The Singapore Improvement Trust (SIT), established in 1927 by the British to manage infrastructure and later public housing, struggled to keep up with demand and was slow to address Singapore's housing needs. Conditions only began to improve after the 1959 general election, when the People's Action Party (PAP) under Lee Kuan Yew came to power and the government formed the Housing and Development Board (HDB) to tackle the housing situation.

Following the Bukit Ho Swee fire in 1961 and the rapid modernisation after the independence of Singapore in 1965, almost all kampongs across Singapore were removed and new towns were established. In the subsequent decades, Singaporeans were resettled into public housing, and today around 80 percent of the population lives in high-rise apartments.

Before its conversion into a military area, Pulau Tekong had several kampongs, and others were also found on the Southern and Western Islands. Although most have disappeared, traces remain in the form of former mosques once serving kampong communities, and historic districts such as Kampong Glam retain the name. The best known surviving example is Kampong Lorong Buangkok, one of the last kampongs on the mainland.

== See also ==
- Barangay
- Mukim
- Rural area
- Village
- Favela
