= Ciptagelar =

Sundanese hamlet in West Java, Indonesia

Coordinates: 6°48′09″S 106°29′54″E

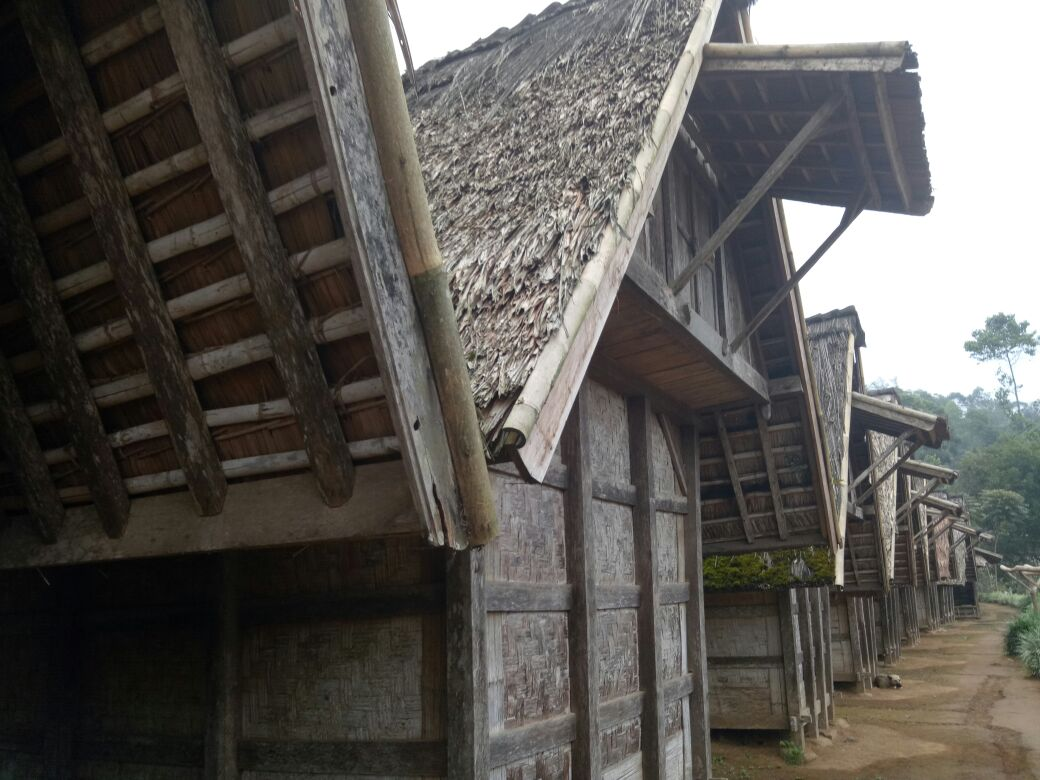
Traditional Sundanese houses in Ciptagelar

Ciptagelar (Indonesian pronunciation: [t͡ʃɪpt̪aɡəˈlar]) is a traditional Sundanese hamlet in Sukabumi Regency, West Java. Founded in 1368, the hamlet is the largest village of the Kasepuhan community which retains traditional Sundanese social structure and strictly adheres to adat (customary law) to this day. The village is also known for its Sundanese style houses which value simplicity and harmony with nature.

== Geography ==
Ciptagelar is located in Sirnaresmi village, Cisolok district of Sukabumi Regency. It is deep in the hinterland area of Mount Halimun and Mount Salak which is part of the Mount Halimun Salak National Park. The village is also surrounded by other mountains such as Mount Surandil, Mount Karacang, and Mount Kendang.

The village is situated at an altitude of 1,050 meters above sea level and has a temperature ranging from 20 to 26 degrees Celsius.

== Community ==
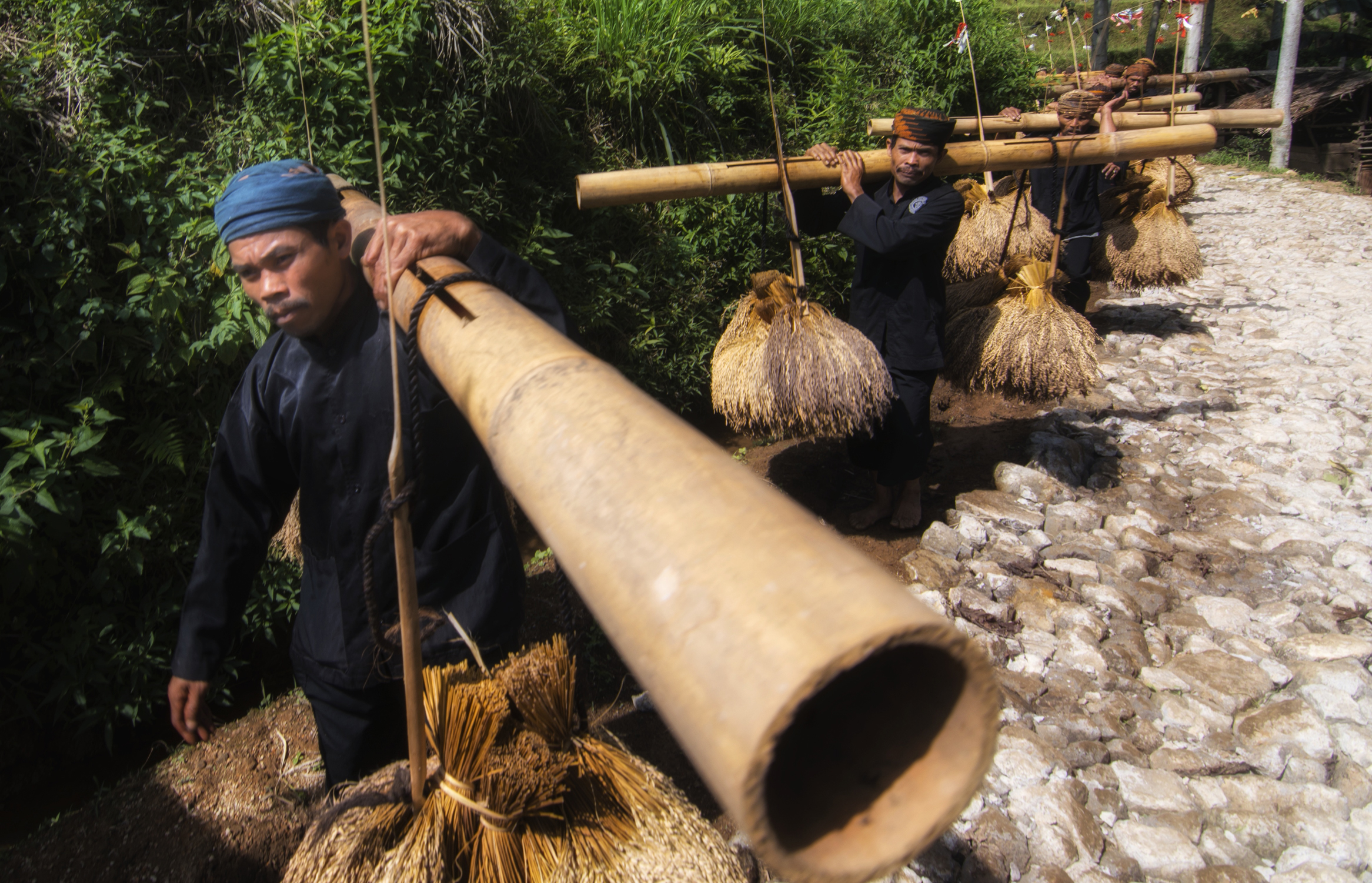
Ciptagelar farmers carrying rice paddy after harvest

The community of Ciptagelar is known as Urang Ciptagelar. Kasepuhan is a traditional Sundanese society based on the customs and habits of elder generations. The word kasepuhan itself comes from the word sepuh with the prefix 'ka-' and the suffix '-an' which in Sundanese language means kolot or "old." Literally, kasepuhan can be interpreted as the residence of elders or those who are elders. Within the society, the orders (wangsit) by the ancestors (karuhun) regulate their rituals and traditions.

The community of Kasepuhan Ciptagelar spreads across three districts around the border area of Banten and West Java Provinces, including Lebak Regency, Bogor Regency and Sukabumi Regency. Ciptagelar is the largest village of the Kasepuhan Ciptagelar community. Houses in the village are made of wood, covered with bamboo booths, and roofed with dried palm fronds.

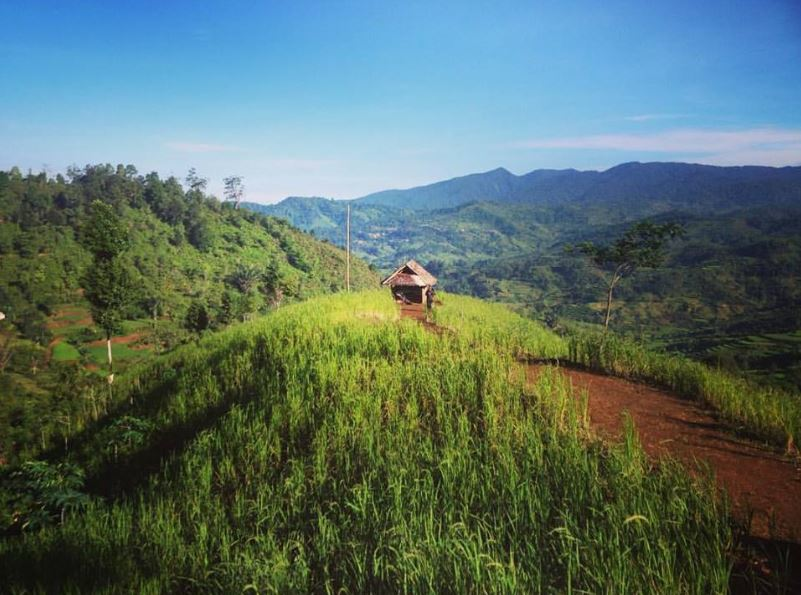
Dry rice cultivation in Ciptagelar

The majority of villagers in the Kasepuhan Ciptagelar community work as farmers, especially those who live in the Mount Halimun National Park area. A small proportion of them works as traders, breeders, laborers, and employees. As for land cultivation, the residents of Kasepuhan Ciptagelar use traditional farming methods and systems. They plant rice once a year by observing astronomical signs, and they never use chemical fertilizers, tractors, or rice mills. It is prohibited to sell rice or paddy, and this makes Kasepuhan Ciptagelar able to achieve food self-sufficiency for the subsequent years after the harvest.

The people of Kasepuhan Ciptagelar believe that humans have the duty to maintain the balance of nature because the order and balance of the universe is something absolute. Any disaster is the result of disturbances in the balance of nature.

The existence of the traditional village in Ciptagelar has been widely recognized by the people of West Java, mainly because of farming traditions such as Seren Taun which is the highlight of the annual rice planting ritual. The event also presents arts such as the art of Jipeng, Topeng, Angklung Buhun, Wayang Golek, Ujungan, Debus, and Pantun Buhun.

== Introduction of modern technology ==
In the modern era, the village of Ciptagelar also begun to introduce modern technologies. Among them is the establishment of a TV station known as Ciptagelar Television or CIGA TV which was founded in 2008. Ugi Sugriwa Raka Siwi, the leader of Ciptagelar village, stated that the villagers need to obtain information from the outside world. At the same time, the TV station airs local content such as farming period, which is rarely shown on national TV stations. The villagers are happy with the introduction of TV with locally focused content.

The village of Ciptagelar also owns its own radio channel known as Radio Swara Ciptagelar. While the radio station has obtained a license from the Sukabumi Regency, 60% of the content must be locally related.

According to the Ministry of Education and Culture, the village of Ciptagelar already uses modern technology such as turbine generators and solar panels. However, they maintain the tradition of farming rituals without the use of modern tools, in order to keep the synergy between the surrounding nature.
