= Seren taun =

Sundanese rice harvest festival

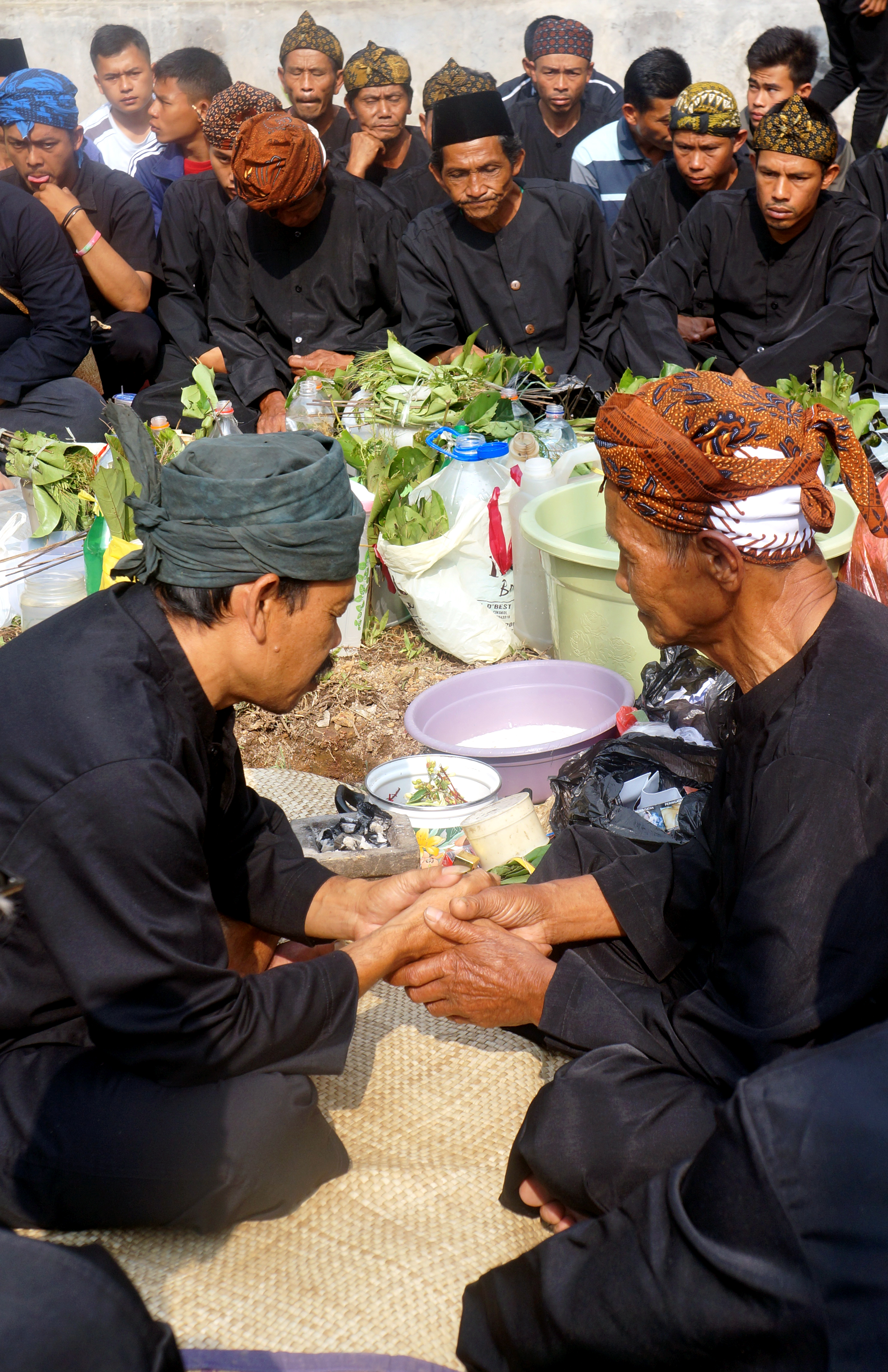
Seren Taun at the village of Malasari, Bogor Regency

Seren Taun is an annual traditional Sundanese rice harvest festival and ceremony. The festival was originally held to mark the new agriculture year in the Sundanese ancient calendar as well as thanks giving for the blessings of the abundance rice harvest, and also to pray for the next successful harvest. Seren Taun demonstrates the Sundanese agricultural way of life, and is held in high regard in Sundanese traditional villages, as the festival draw thousands Sundanese villagers to participate as well as Indonesian or foreign visitors.

There are several traditional Sundanese villages that hold this annual festival, the notable villages are:

- Cigugur village, Kuningan Regency, West Java
- Kasepuhan Banten Kidul, Ciptagelar village, Cisolok, Sukabumi, West Java
- Sindang Barang village, Pasir Eurih, Taman Sari, Bogor, West Java
- Kanekes village, Lebak, Banten Province
- Kampung Naga, Tasikmalaya, West Java

== Etymology ==
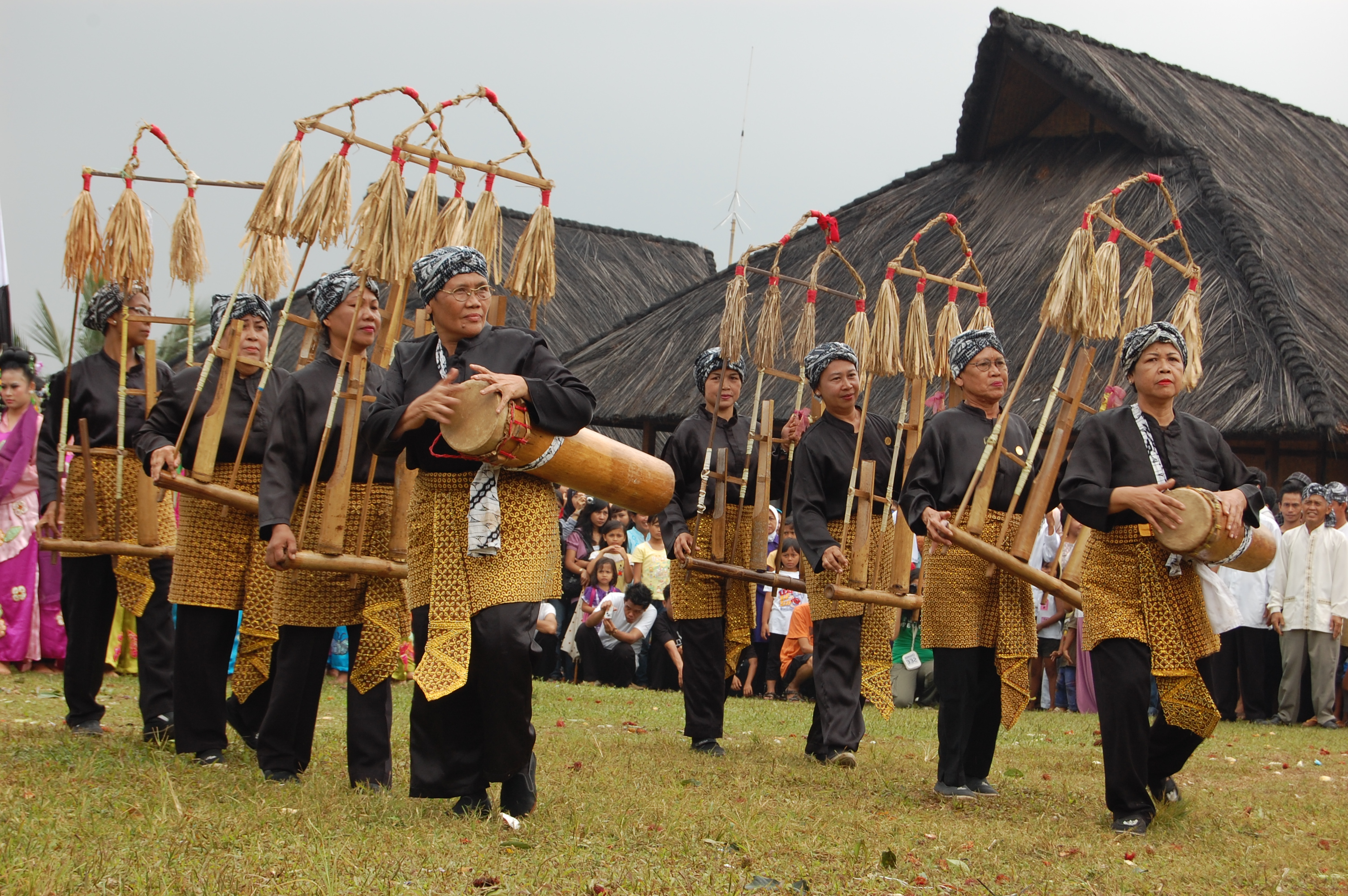
Seren Taun ceremony in a traditional village in Bogor performing angklung buncis bamboo musical instrument.

"Seren Taun" is derived from Sundanese language seren that means "to give" and taun which means "year". Seren taun means the last year has given way to the new year, which means the transition between agriculture years. In Sundanese agriculture community, Seren Taun is the festival to express gratitude and thanksgiving to God for the blessing of rice harvest abundance, as well as to pray for the successful rice harvest in the next agriculture cycle.

Another specific definition of Seren Taun is to give the rice harvest and present it to community leaders to be stored in communal barns (Sundanese: leuit) There are two kinds of leuit: the main barn and the secondary barn. The main barn is held in high importance and considered sacred; it can be called leuit sijimat, leuit ratna inten, or leuit indung (mother barn). The secondary barns are called leuit pangiring or leuit leutik (small barn). Leuit indung contained the sacred rice seed, the pare ambu or pare indung (mother rice seed) covered in white cloth, and pare bapa or pare abah (father rice seed) covered in black cloth. Leuit pangiring (secondary barns) are rows of barns to store the offering rices when the main barn is already full.

== History ==
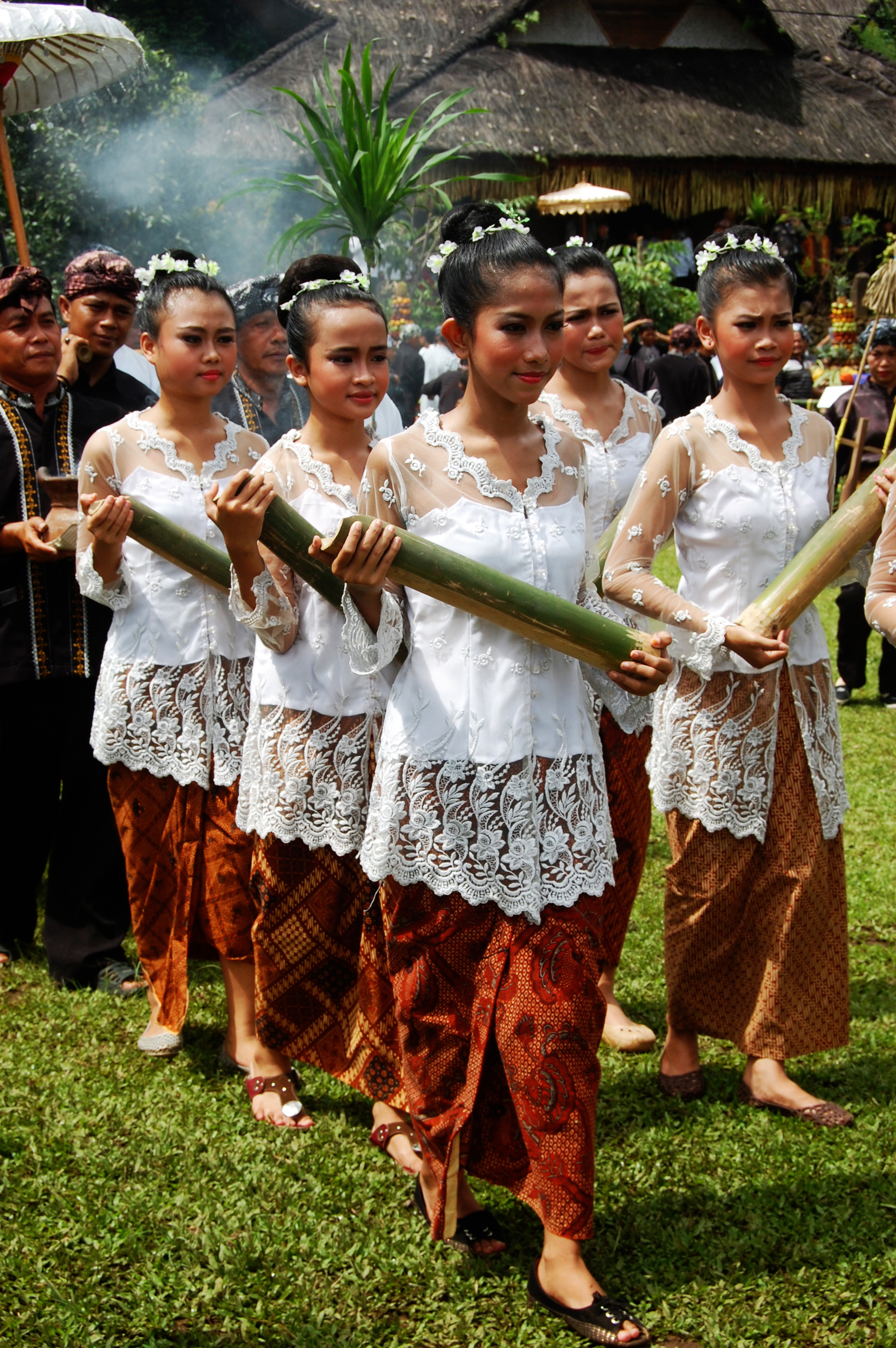
Sundanese girls participating in Seren Taun ceremony in Bogor Regency.

According to historical records as well as local traditions, Seren Taun is held annually since the era of Sunda Kingdom. The ceremony was started as a dedication to Nyi Pohaci Sanghyang Asri, the goddess of rice in ancient Sundanese beliefs. Ancient Sundanese religion was influenced by animism and dynamism that revered the spirit of karuhun (ancestors) as well as unseen natural power identified as hyang, and it is also influenced by Hinduism. Since ancient times Sundanese are agricultural community that revered natural power that give fertility in plants and animals, this natural divine power is identified as Nyi Pohaci Sanghyang Asri, the goddess of rice and fertility. According to Sundanese beliefs her husband is Kuwera, the god of wealth. Both are symbolize in Pare Abah (father rice) and Pare Ambu (mother rice), signify the union of man and woman as the primordial symbol of fertility and family happiness. There are two kinds of harvest ceremony in Sunda Kingdom; Seren Taun Guru Bumi that is held annually and Seren Taun Tutug Galur that is held only once every eight years. Seren Taun Guru Bumi held in Pakuan Pajajaran capital and various villages, while the Seren Taun Tutug Galur or also called Kuwera Bakti only held in Pakuan.

Seren Taun annually held in Sunda Kingdom and ceased after the fall of Sunda Pajajaran kingdom. Several decades later the ceremony revived in Sindang Barang, Kuta Batu and Cipakancilan village, and continued until it ceased in the 1970s. After 36 years pause, the ceremony was revived again in 2006 at Sindang Barang cultural village, Pasir Eurih, Sari, Bogor. The Seren Taun Guru Bumi celebrated again to revived cultural identity of Sundanese people.

In Cigugur, Kuningan, Seren Taun is held every 22 Rayagung, the last month of Sundanese calendar. The ceremony is concentrated in pendopo Paseban Tri Panca Tunggal, the residence of prince Djatikusumah, constructed in 1840. The adherents of native Sunda Wiwitan belief still celebrate this annual harvest festival, such as Kanekes (Baduy) people, Kasepuhan Banten Kidul, and Cigugur. Today most of Sundanese are Muslim, however this tradition still survives and is celebrated although the prayer is now conducted in an Islamic way.

== Rituals ==
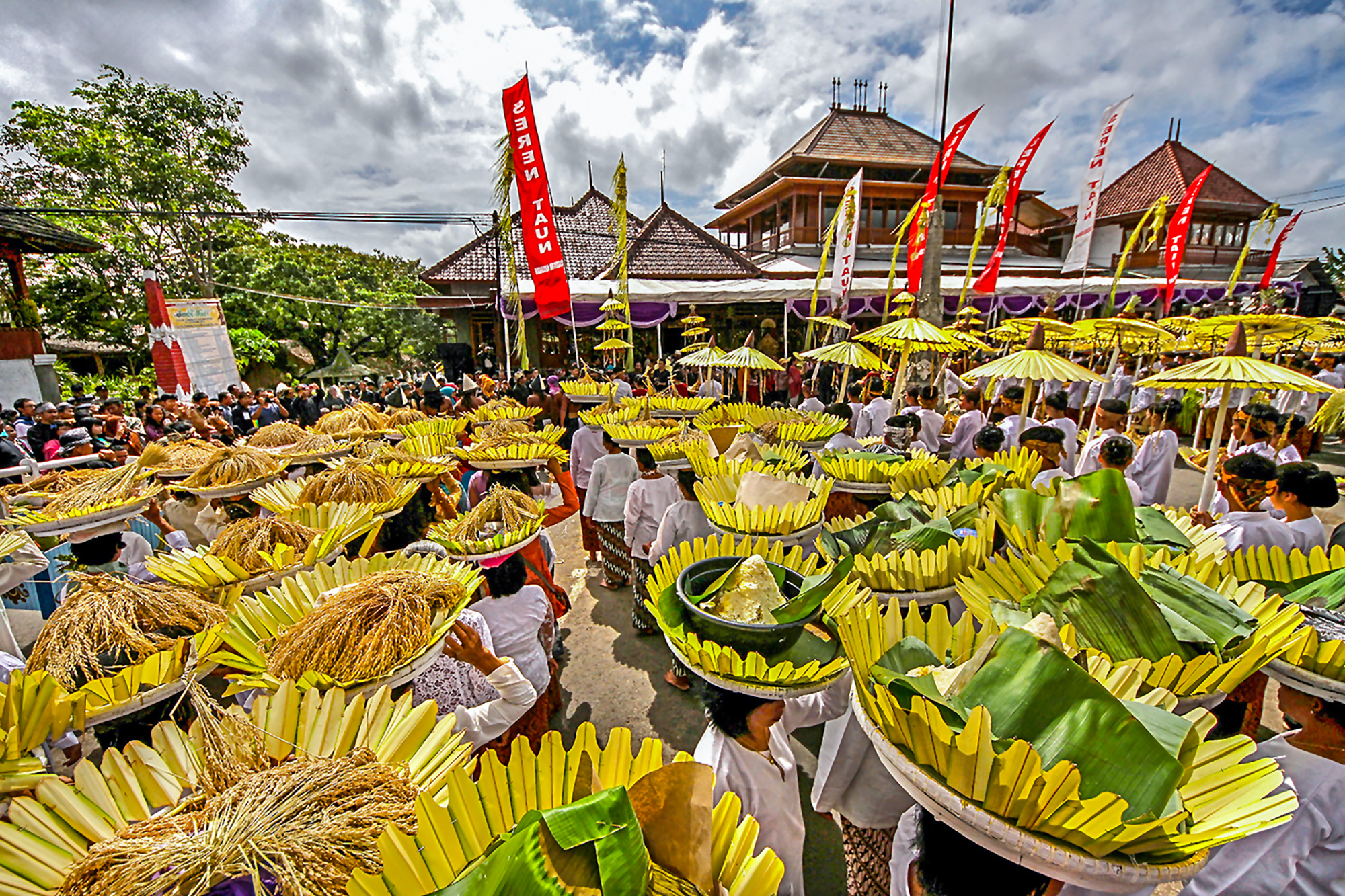
Trays containing tumpeng and rice during Seren Taun ceremony in Kuningan.

The Seren Taun rituals are different and varied among each villages, however the main ritual is the procession to presenting the rice to community leader. This rice are put into main leuit (rice barn) and secondary rice barns. The community leader later gave indung pare (mother of rice) that already blessed by the villages leaders to be planted in the next agriculture cycle.

In some villages the rituals usually started with the collections of waters from several sacred water springs. Usually the water are collected from seven water springs in small jars to be united in one large water vessel, the water is blessed through prayers and considered sacred. The sacred water is later sprinkled upon people present in the festival, it is considered potent and would bring good luck and good fortunes for the people. The next rituals is sedekah kue, people brought traditional cakes, delicacies and also tumpeng on wooden palanquin. The cake later is fought among villagers as it is believed to bring good luck, and the tumpeng rice is distributed among the people to be consumed together. The slaughtering of water buffalo might also become the part of rituals, the meat is later distributed to the poor families in the village. Later in the night the wayang golek performance is held in the village main communal building.

The main ritual of seren usually started in 08.00 in the morning, started with ngajayak procession (procession to bring and presenting the rice), continued with three mass performances; buyung dance, angklung baduy and angklung buncis angklung music performance, usually performed during seren taun in Cigugur. The ritual started with prayer to express gratitude to God for the abundance of harvest. Ngajayak main ritual is the presenting of rice from villagers to community leader to be stored in main barn, the rest is stored in secondary barns. Some of the rice is later rhythmically pounded together by women using wooden mortars and pestles. Some of blessed rice seed is placed in pavilion called Pwah Aci Sanghyang Asri (Pohaci Sanghyang Asri), and this rice seed is sought and fought by villagers as it is also believed to bring good fortune.

In Cigugur, Kuningan, Seren Taun is started on 18 Rayagung. Several traditional Sundanese cultural performances is also demonstrated, such as pencak silat, Sundanese dances, nyiblung (water music), suling rando, tarawelet, karinding, and suling kumbang of Baduy people.
