= Kasepuhan Banten Kidul =

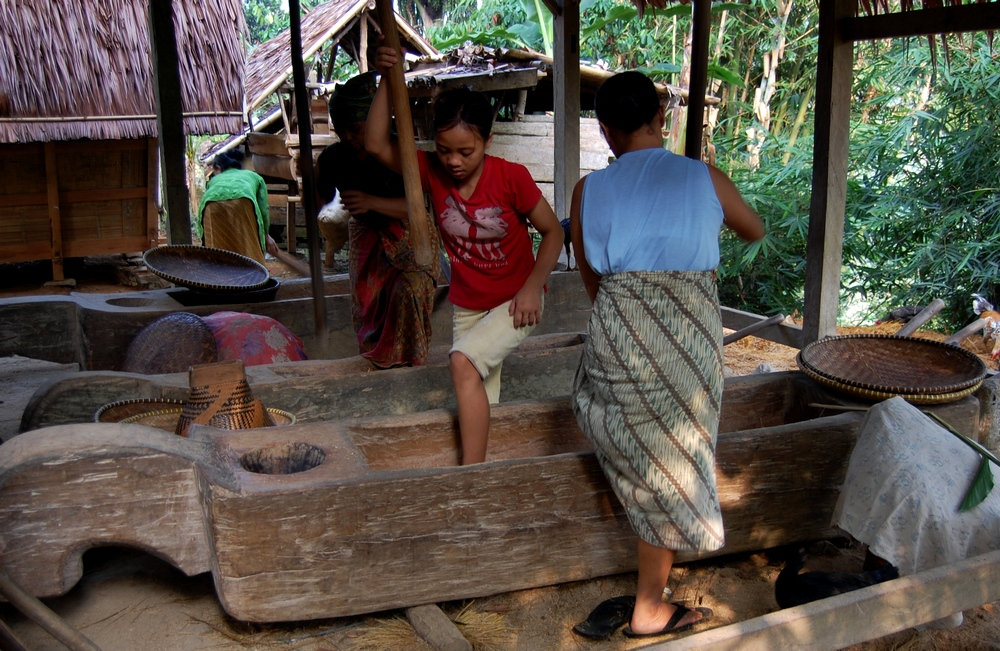
Pestling rice in the traditional fashion at Sirnarasa village

The Kasepuhan Banten Kidul (English: Kasepuhan of South Banten) are a traditional Sundanese community of approximately 5,300 people. They live in the southern part of Mount Halimun Salak National Park, in the Indonesian province of West Java. The national park is located within the borders of the Sukabumi Regency, Bogor Regency, and Lebak Regency (in southern part of Banten province).

Their main village is Ciptagelar in the Cisolok district (kecamatan) in the western part of the Sukabumi Regency. As of 2008 the head of the community was Abah Ugi, who inherited his position from his father, Abah Anom. Other well-known villages are Cibedug, Citorek, and Sirnaresmi.

== Economy ==
They primarily live via agriculture, split in two categories: huma (dry rice cultivation) and sawah (wet rice cultivation). The dry system is the original way. The Dutch introduced the wet system.

About 85% of Kasepuhan agricultural land is sawah, 10% consists of ladang, and 5% kebun. They emphasise eco-friendly techniques. The surrounding land is mostly forest. The three forest categories are Leuweung Tutupan (forbidden forest), Leuweung Titipan (forbidden forest), Leuweung Garapan (cultivated forest).

== Culture ==
The main ritual of Kasepuhan community is Seren Taun, or rice harvest thanksgiving. The festival marks the new agriculture year. Seren Tuan festival is also celebrated by other Sundanese traditional communities in other areas, such as Sundanese community in Cigugur, Kuningan.

== See also ==
- Ciptagelar
- Baduy people
