= The Shrimp People =

1991 novel by Rex Shelley

- Author: Rex Shelley
- Language: English
- Publisher: Times Books International
- Publication date: 1991
- ISBN: 981-204-292-X (first edition)
- Dewey Decimal: 823
- LC Class: PR9570.S53 S54

The Shrimp People is a 1991 novel by Eurasian Singaporean writer Rex Shelley. The book won National Book Development Council of Singapore (NBDCS) Book Award in 1992.

== Plot ==
The novel tells the story of Bertha Rodrigues, the youngest child of police inspector James Rodrigues and Mary Gomez, a housewife. Their family is Eurasian, descended from the Portuguese. Bertha is a gifted hockey player who becomes embroiled in the espionage activities of Indonesia: the Indonesians are determined to upset the political unity of Singapore and Malaya after the 1962 Singaporean national referendum. The book then moves to a surprising conclusion.
