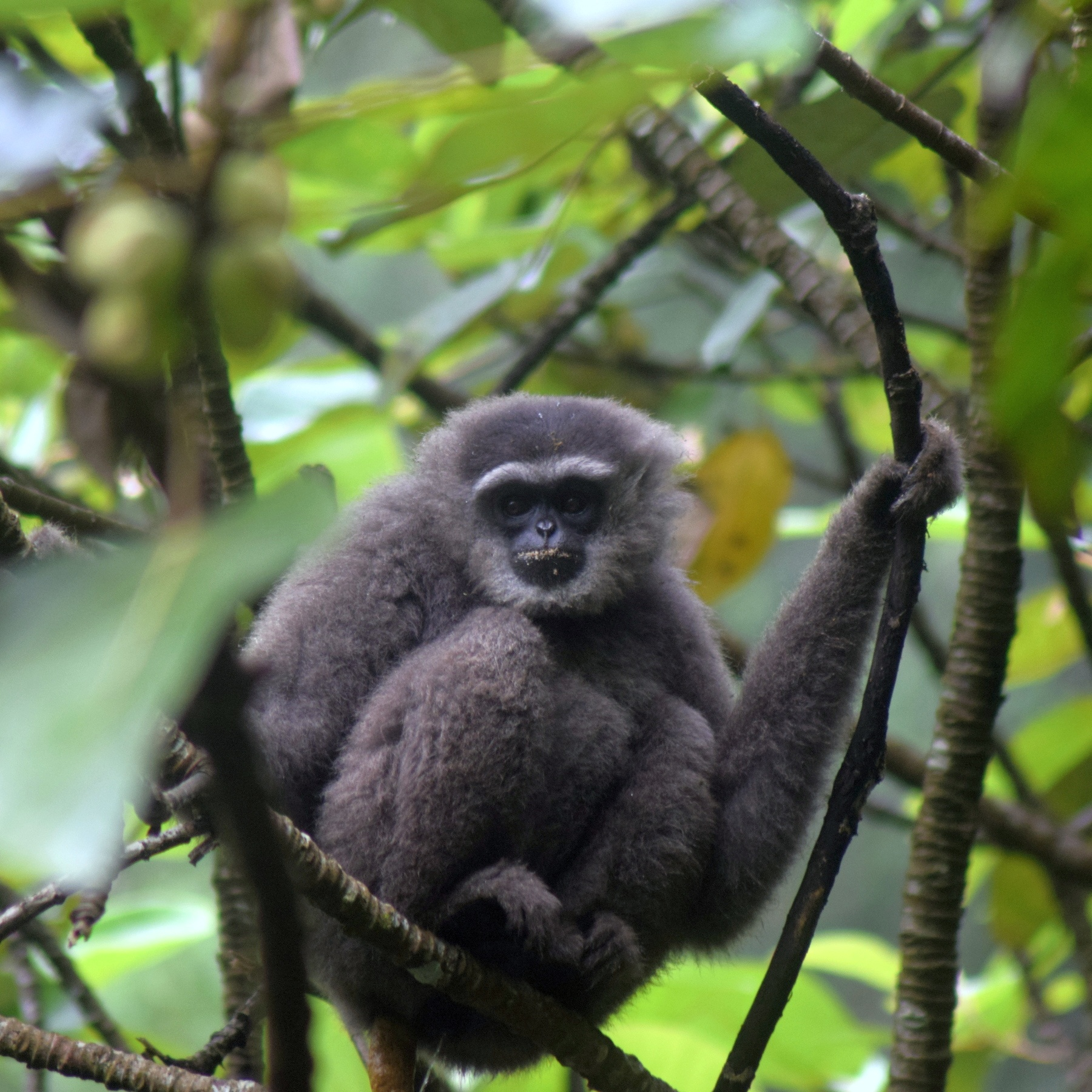
- A silvery gibbon foraging in a Ficus tree. Photograph taken in Mount Halimun Salak National Park

Conservation status
- Endangered (IUCN 3.1)
- CITES Appendix I

Scientific classification
- Kingdom: Animalia
- Phylum: Chordata
- Class: Mammalia
- Infraclass: Placentalia
- Order: Primates
- Superfamily: Hominoidea
- Family: Hylobatidae
- Genus: Hylobates
- Species: H. moloch

Binomial name
- Hylobates moloch (Audebert, 1798)
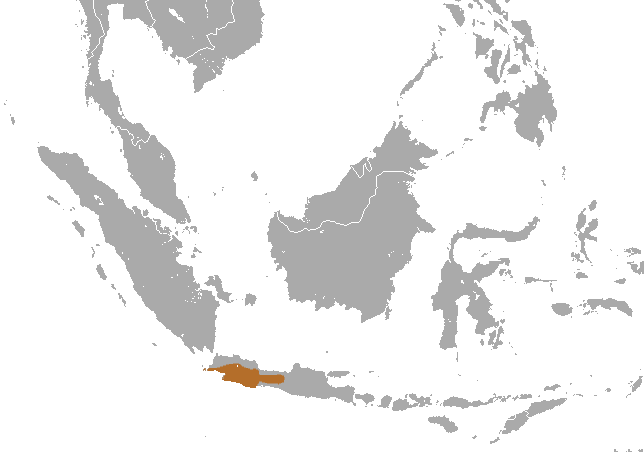
- Silvery gibbon range

= Silvery gibbon =

Species of ape

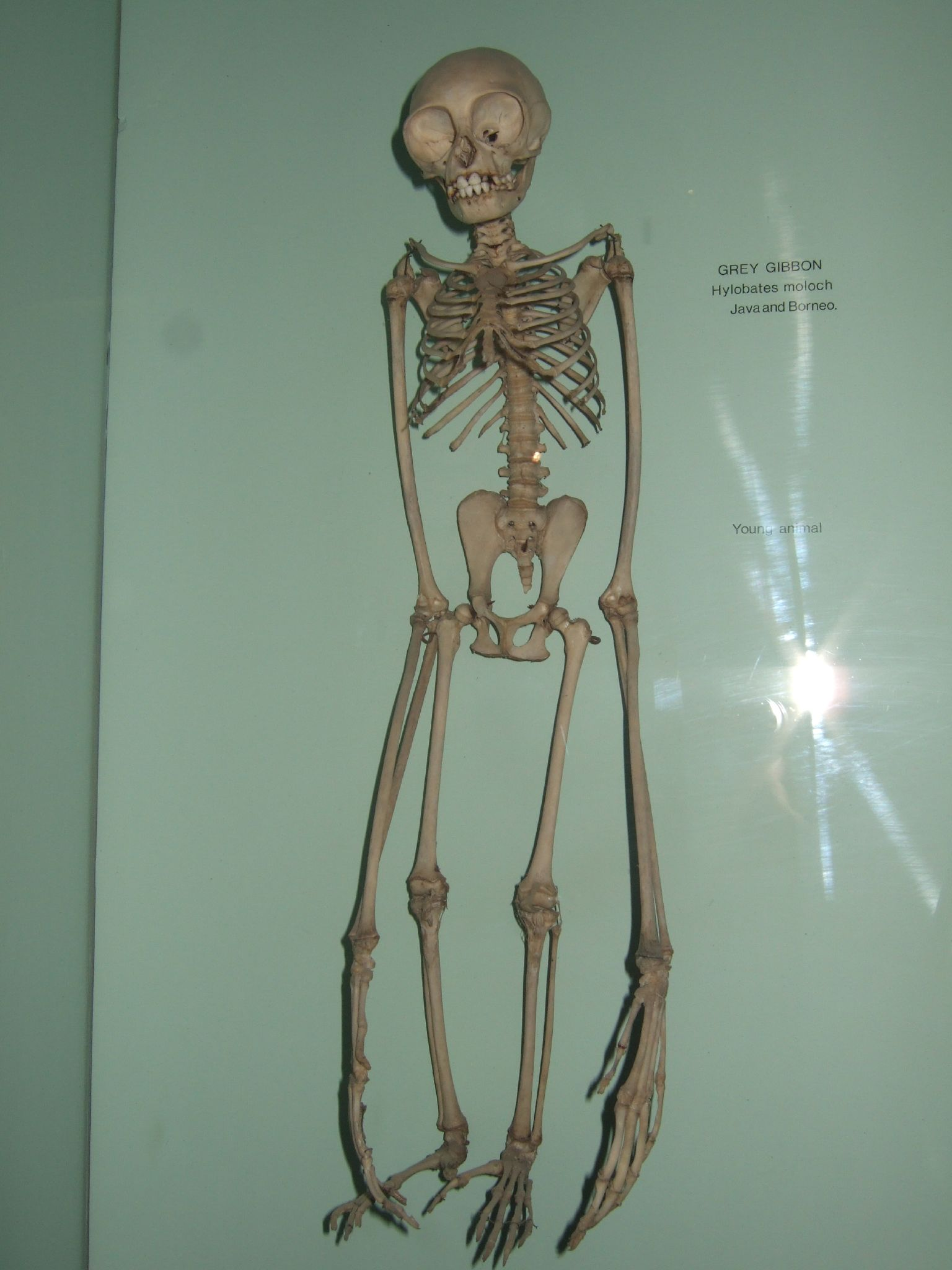
skeleton

The silvery gibbon (Hylobates moloch), also known as the Javan gibbon, is a primate in the gibbon family Hylobatidae. It is endemic to the Indonesian island of Java, where it inhabits undisturbed rainforests up to an altitude of 2,450 m (8,040 ft). It has been listed as Endangered on the IUCN Red List since 2008, as the wild population is estimated to comprise less than 2500 mature individuals.

Its coat is bluish-grey, with a dark grey or black cap. Like all gibbons, the silvery gibbon lacks an external tail, has dorsally placed scapulae, and reduced flexibility in its lumbar region. It has long, curved fingers and very long forelimbs relative to its hind limbs. On average, it reaches 8 kg (18 lb) in weight. It is diurnal and arboreal, climbing trees skilfully and brachiating through the forests. Brachiation is possible because of its mobile wrist joints, full rotation of the upper arm, and the ability to lock elbows in suspension. Its diet consists of fruits, leaves, and flowers.

Every three years, on average, the female gives birth to a single young, after a gestation of seven months. The offspring is nursed for about 18 months and lives with the family group until it is fully mature at about eight to ten years old.

== Behaviour and ecology ==
Like all gibbon species, the silvery gibbon lives in pairs and stakes out territory that the pair strongly defends; it has relatively small territories of about 42 acres (17 hectares). Females sing to declare their territory several times a day, and if strangers are spotted, the male screams in an attempt to scare them away. The majority of the solo song bouts or scream bouts are produced by females. The female vocal bouts occur after 0500 hr, with the vocal bout activity peaking around 0600 hr. In contrast, the male vocal bouts primarily occurred before 0500 hr was created in the style of a chorus, with a minimum of three participants. There are choruses around every 8.5 days. It took place sooner and lasted longer than female solo song fights. The majority of male songs begin in the dark, between 0355 and 0440 hours. The males are usually very aggressive toward others.

== Threats and conservation ==
The silvery gibbon ranks among the most threatened primates. It is listed as Endangered on the 2009 IUCN Red List, with the population appearing more stable than in a 2004 assessment of the species being Critically Endangered, which suggested there was a 50% chance of the silvery gibbon becoming extinct within the next decade. Habitat destruction on densely populated Java continues to reduce the natural range of the species. Many gibbons are also lost to the illegal pet trade when adults are hunted so their young can be sold in the markets as pets.

There are less than 2,000 silvery gibbons in the wild on eight sites that are considered to be genetically viable for the continuation of the species. There are also a dozen small, non-viable populations. Mount Halimun Salak National Park sustains the largest population of ca. 1,000 gibbons. Other large populations of several hundred are found in the Gunung Ciremai National Park and Gunung Gede Pangrango National Park. In the latter, there is a Javan Gibbon Centre that rehabilitates ex-captive gibbons.

Several zoos operate silvery gibbon breeding programs. Despite these efforts, the future survival of this species is in question.
