= Sundanese traditional house =

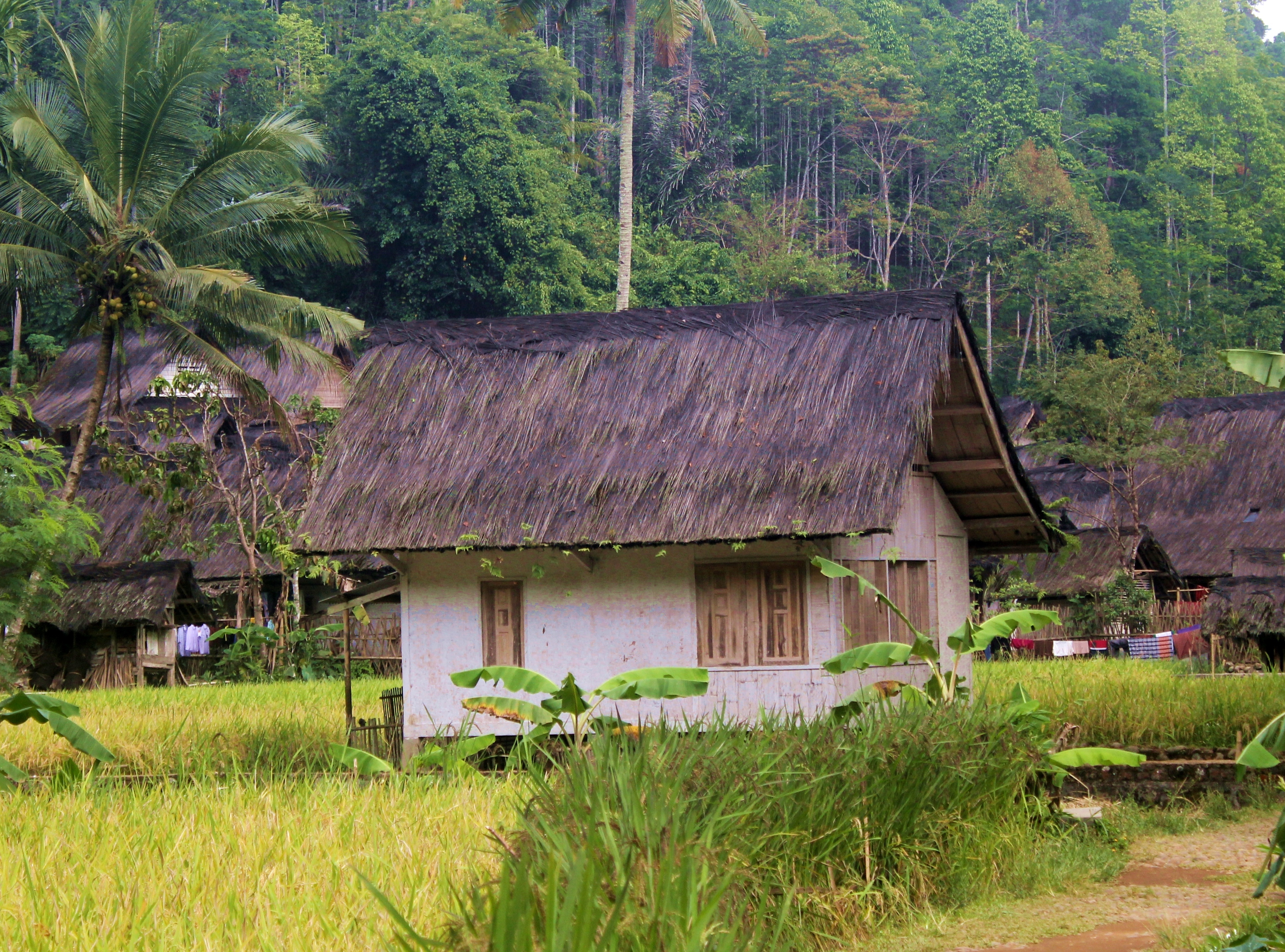
A traditional Sundanese house with Tagog anjing shape in Kampung Naga village, Tasikmalaya.

Sundanese traditional house refers to the traditional vernacular houses of the Sundanese people, who predominantly inhabited the western part of Java island, Indonesia. The architecture of a Sundanese house is characterized by its functionality, simplicity, modesty, uniformity with a little detail, its use of natural thatched materials, and the quite faithful adherence to harmony with nature and the environment.

== Form and materials ==
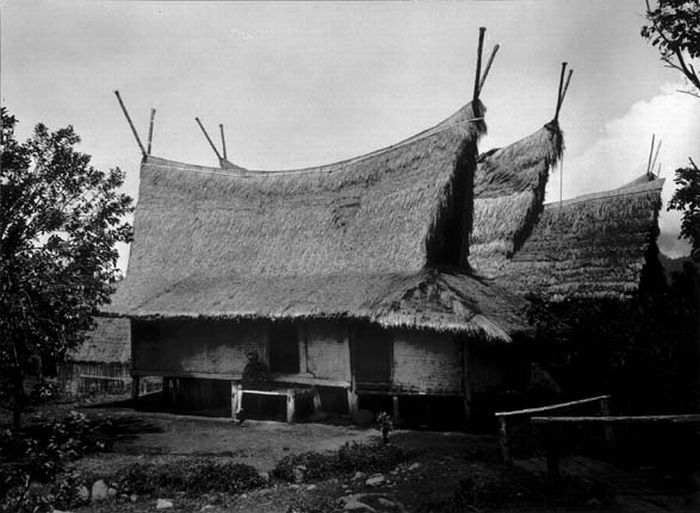
A traditional Sundanese house with Julang ngapak roof and Capit Gunting ornament in Papandak, Garut circa 1920s.

The Sundanese traditionally maintain the knowledge of their ancestors and their traditional lifestyles in close harmony with nature, which extends to their construction methods, using local materials such as timber, stone, bamboo, thatched materials, and palm leaves.

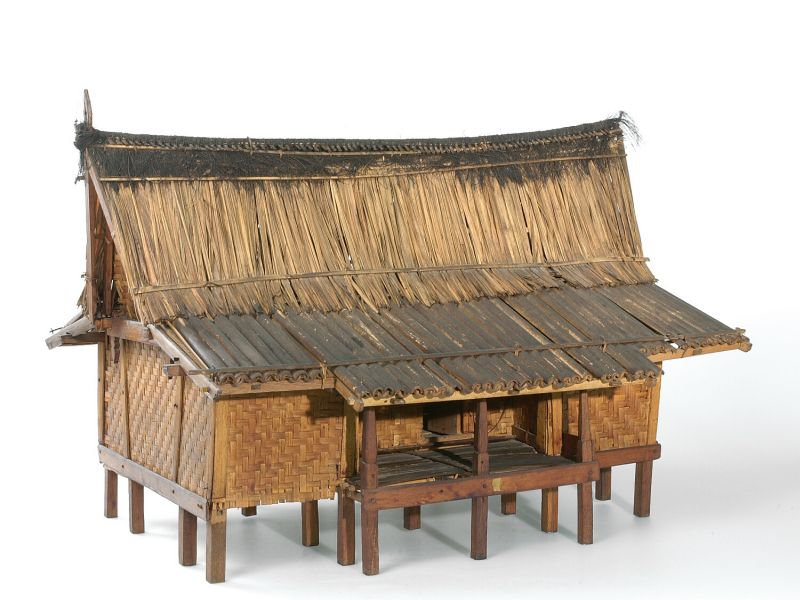
A model of Julang ngapak form of Sundanese traditional house

Sundanese traditional houses mostly take the basic form of a gable roofed structure, commonly called kampung-style roof, made of thatched materials (ijuk black aren fibers, hateup leaves or palm leaves) covering wooden frames and beams, woven bamboo walls, and its structure is built on short stilts. Its roof variations might include hip and gablet roof (combination of gable and hip roof).

The more elaborate overhanging gablet roof is called julang ngapak, which means "bird spreading wings". Other traditional Sundanese house forms including Buka Pongpok, Capit Gunting, Jubleg Nangkub, Badak Heuay, Tagog Anjing, and Perahu Kemureb. The ornamentation commonly includes the "o" or "x" shaped roof edges that called capit gunting, which is very similar to a certain "x" design of Malay houses' roof.

Next to houses, rice barn or called leuit in Sundanese, is also an essential structure in traditional Sundanese agricultural community. Leuit is especially important during Seren Taun harvest ceremony.

== Layout ==
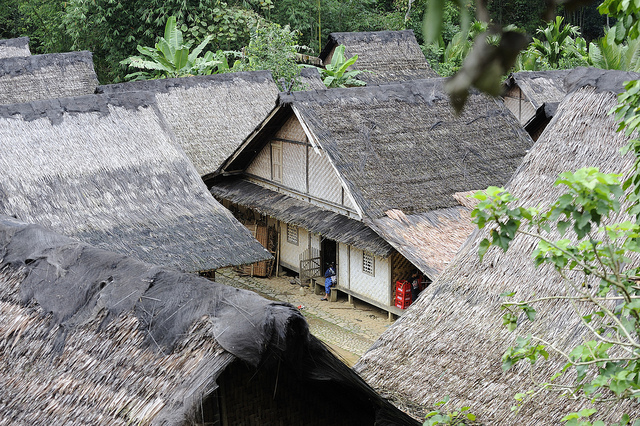
Sulah nyanda of the Baduy

Compared to Javanese houses, Dayak longhouses or Minangkabau houses, Sundanese traditional houses are much smaller, consisting of only three parts or rooms for a single nuclear family. A more traditional house of the Baduy people, a sub-ethnic of the Sundanese people, is called Sulah Nyanda. It is commonly regarded as the blueprint of common Sundanese traditional houses. It is made from wooden frame, woven bamboo wall, and dried palm leaves roof.

The traditional Sulah Nyanda house is divided into three parts: sosoro (front), tepas (middle) and imah (rear) rooms. Each room functions according to the family requirements.

The veranda-like front of the house, commonly called the sosoro, serves as a guests' reception area. This is because guests are usually not allowed to get into the house. Other functions including a place to relax and weave for women. The front is shaped to the side with an opening gap as the entrance.

The middle room is called tepas, used for sleeping quarter and family meetings. While at the back of the house or commonly called as imah used as a place to cook and store the produce of fields especially rice. Each room is equipped with holes on the floor for air circulation.

== History ==
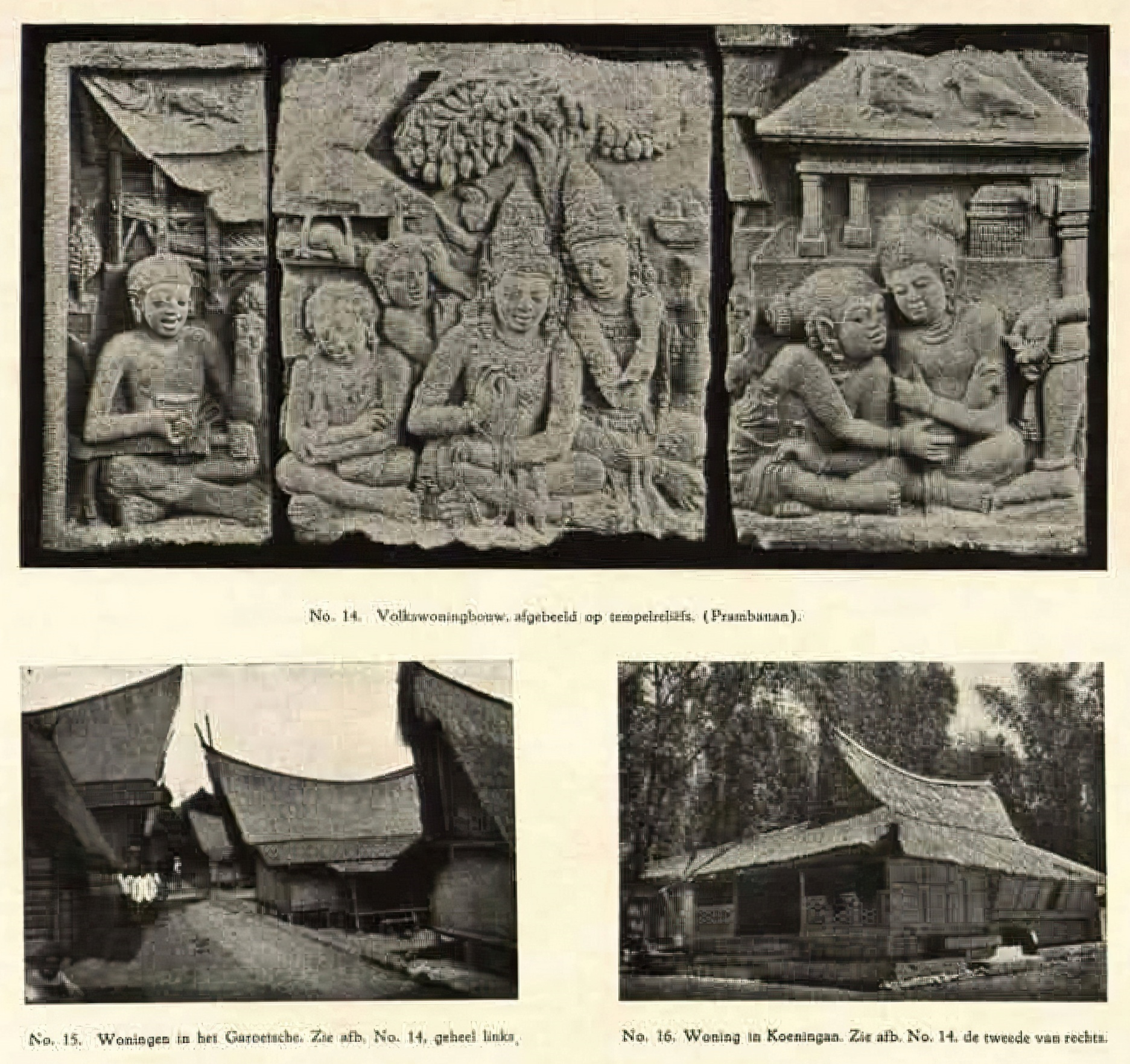
The bas-reliefs on the 9th century Prambanan temple depicting vernacular architecture, compared to the structures of traditional Sundanese houses in Garut and Kuningan of the 1920s that are similar to it.

Sundanese house architecture reflects the culture of the Sundanese people. Unlike Javanese houses, which adhere to such social hierarchy reflected in the stratification of roof types in their houses, Sundanese houses are more egalitarian with a touch of uniformity; the common similarly designed small-sized houses clustered together in their kampung (village). This layout can be found in numbers of Sundanese traditional villages.

The houses of the Baduy people are examples of traditional Sundanese architecture that still strictly adheres to traditional life, rules and taboos. The Baduy people are well known for their hermit-like self-imposed isolationism which rejects the modern way of life and outside influences. For example, it is forbidden for them to apply masonry technique, such as using earthenware or terracotta tiles for roof, nor using bricks, sand and cements as building materials. It is also forbidden for them to excessively alter the terrain or level the topography.

Examples of Sundanese traditional houses can be found in numbers of Sundanese traditional villages, such as Kampung Naga in Tasikmalaya Regency; Kampung Ciptagelar on the southern slopes of Mount Halimun, Sukabumi Regency; Kampung Urug; and Kampung Sindang Barang in Bogor Regency.

After the era of Javanese expansion during the Sultan Agung of Mataram era in the 17th century, the Sundanese began to adopt Javanese architectural themes more extensively. Thus, the limasan, joglo, and tajug pyramidal roof more commonly appeared in Sundanese settlements and principalities. Nevertheless, traditional Sundanese architecture was still commonly abundant in rural western Java.

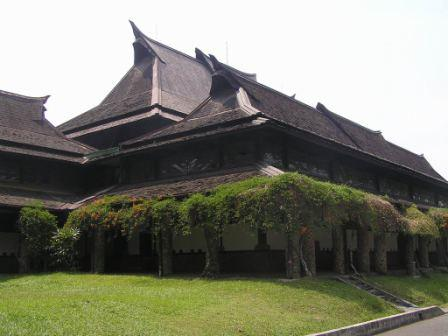
West hall of the Bandung Institute of Technology

The era of European colonialism of the Dutch East India Company and Dutch East Indies after the 17th century brought European architectural techniques, including stone and brick masonry. There was gradual adaptation started in this era to create a colonial architecture in Preanger. Yet, the architectural influence went both ways, as numbers of colonial architecture began to adopt native architecture including Sundanese traditional styles. The Halls of the Tecnische Hogeschool in Bandung, now the Bandung Institute of Technology, designed by Henri Maclaine Pont, has its roof inspired by vernacular architecture of Indonesia, with influences possibly derived from Sundanese Julang Ngapak roof.

Today, there is a steady decline in the number of traditional Sundanese houses, as modern families began to adopt and construct houses in modern style and techniques. More concrete masonry houses were erected in Sundanese cultural areas, and those of truly traditional wooden and bamboo structure, with thatched roofed Sundanese houses, were only left in rural areas.

== See also ==
- Indonesian architecture
- Rumah adat
- Dutch Indies country houses
