= Mount Halimun Salak National Park =

National park in Indonesia

- Taman Nasional Gunung Halimun Salak
- IUCN category II (national park)
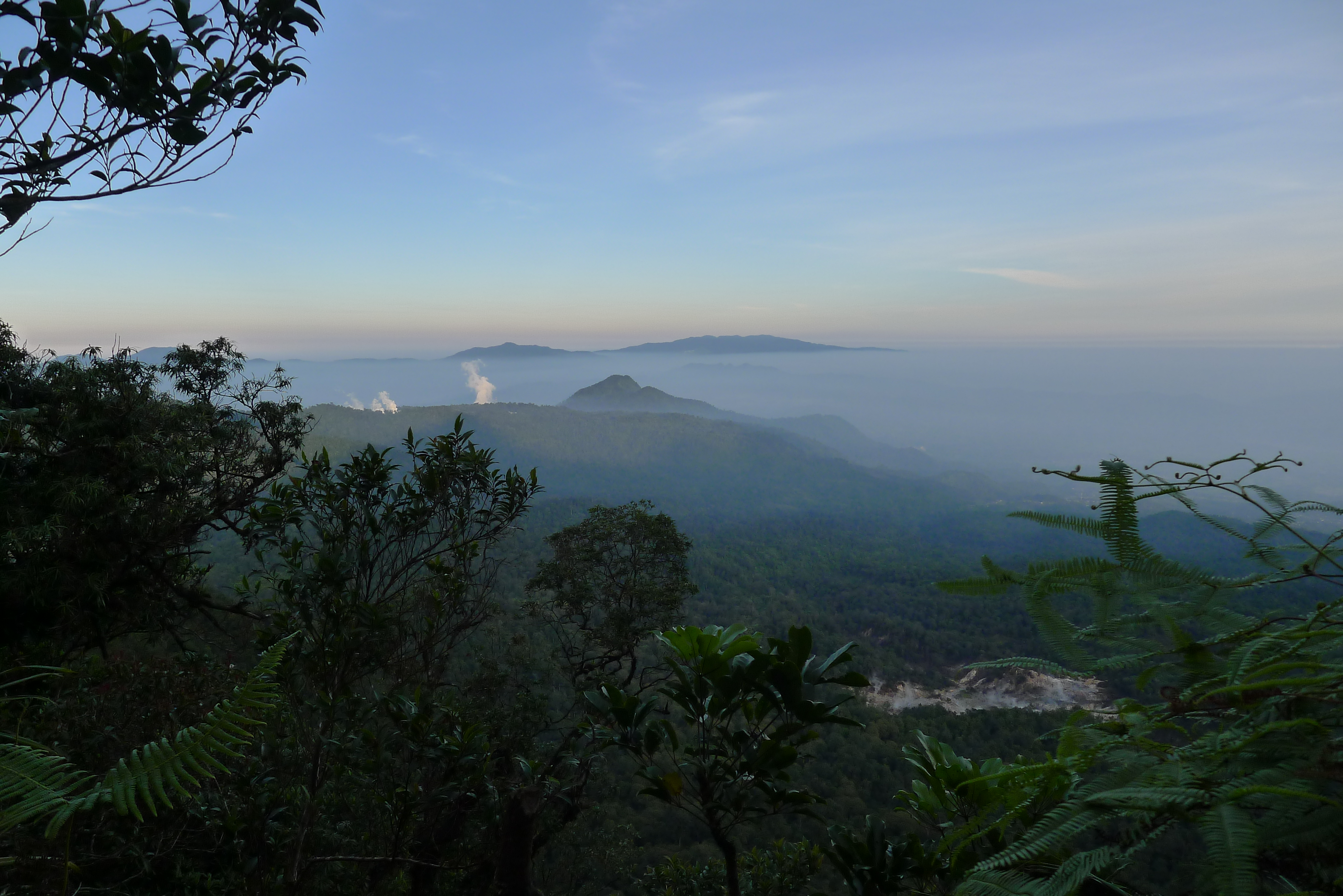
- Volcanic activity of Gunung Salak Kawah Ratu (right) seen from ascent to summit Salak 1.

- Location within Java
- Location: West Java, Indonesia
- Nearest city: Sukabumi
- Coordinates: 6°48′S 106°29′E
- Area: 40,000 hectares (99,000 acres; 400 km^{2})
- Established: February 28, 1992
- Visitors: 7,000 (in 2006)
- Governing body: Ministry of Environment and Forestry
- Website: halimunsalak.org

Mount Halimun Salak National Park is a 400 km^{2} conservation area in the Indonesian province of West Java on the island of Java. Established in 1992, the park comprises two mountains, Mount Salak and Mount Halimun with an 11-kilometer forest corridor. It is located near the better known Mount Gede Pangrango National Park, but the national park should be accessed from Sukabumi, 2 hours drive to the administration post and then 2 hours drive (30 kilometers) again to Cikaniki post gate.

The park contains water catchment areas shielded from urban populations and agricultural areas to the north, as well as several endangered animals and rare birds.

== Geography ==
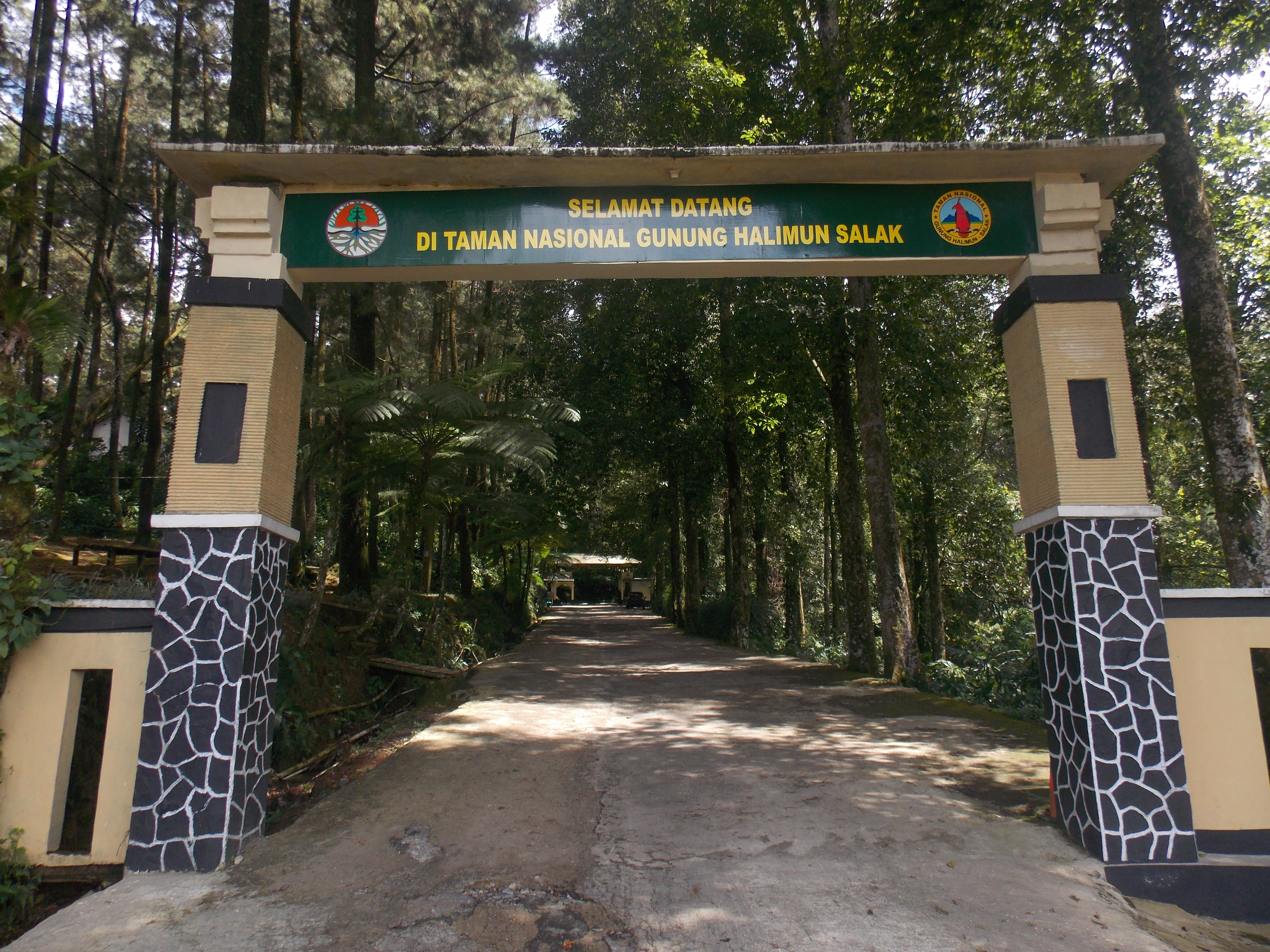
The gate to the national park at Mount Bunder.

Its mountain tops reach 1,929 metres and are often mist-shrouded, while its valleys are thought to hide much that remains to be discovered. Mount Salak is a critical water catchment area for its very high rainfall. The park is an amalgamation of two important ecosystems at Halimun and Mount Salak, connected by an 11-kilometer forest corridor.

=== Communities in the park ===
The Kesepuhan traditional community is a group of around 5,300 people living in the park's southern part. Their main village is Ciptagelar.

== Ecology ==
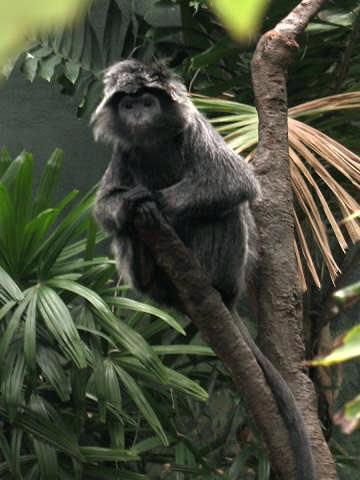
Mount Halimun NP is one of few remaining secure habitats of Javan lutung

The lower zones hold secure populations of the endangered silvery gibbon. Mount Halimun is its most secure habitat, but its range is restricted to a thin ring around the park as the species is not found above 1,200 metres. Javan lutung (Trachypithecus auratus), and other endemic species are evident; about half of its 145 known bird species are rarely seen elsewhere in Java.

Chevron Pacific Indonesia which has a 10,000-hectare geothermal concession, used 3 percent of its area for its power station facilities, has been involved in some conservation activities such as set camera traps.

3 animals are known to breed:

- Silvery gibbon rose from 54 in 2008 to 61 in 2013
- Javan hawk eagle rose from 10 in 2008 to 16 in 2011, but declined to 11 in 2013
- Javan leopard rose significantly from 6 in 2008 to 18 in mid-2014

== See also ==
- Banten
- Cihara River
- Ciletuh-Palabuhanratu Geopark
- Cimandiri River
- Cisadane River
- Mount Perbakti
- Palabuhanratu Bay
- Ujung Kulon National Park
