= Parkway East Hospital =

- Parkway Pantai
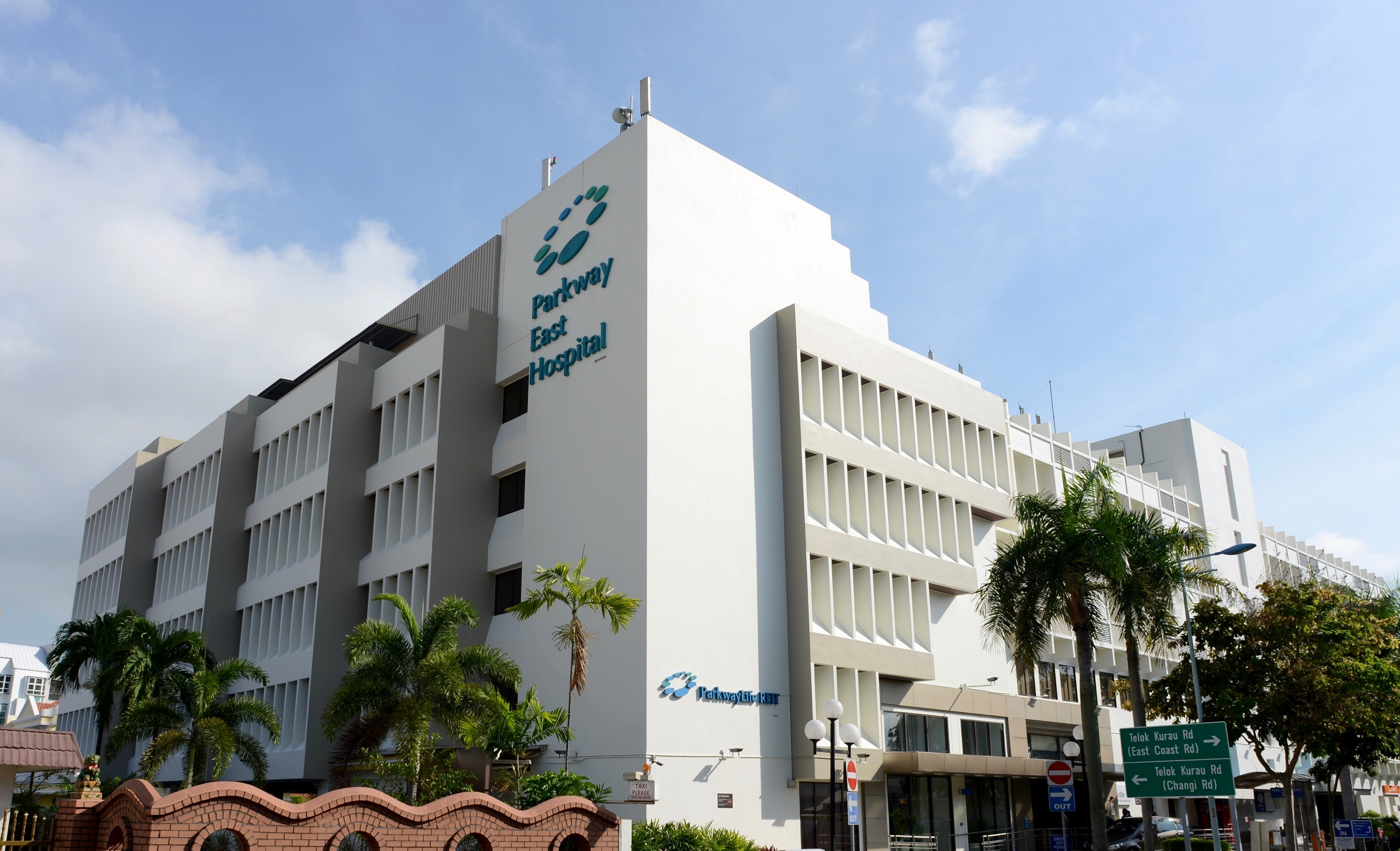
- The facade of Parkway East Hospital in Singapore

Geography
- Location: 321 Joo Chiat Place, Singapore 427990
- Coordinates: 1.315110°N 103.908907°E

Organisation
- Type: General

Services
- Standards: Joint Commission; International; Quality Class
- Emergency department: Yes
- Beds: 143

History
- Former names: East Shore Hospital, East Shore Medical Centre, The American Hospital of Singapore, Saint Mark's Hospital
- Founded: 1942; 84 years ago

Links
- Website: www.parkwayeast.com.sg

Parkway East Hospital is a 143-bed private healthcare facility located at the junction of Joo Chiat Place and Telok Kurau Road in the East of Singapore. It was formerly known as East Shore Hospital or East Shore Medical Centre, The American Hospital of Singapore, and Saint Mark's Hospital.

This hospital provides general and acute care, as well as a comprehensive range of clinical specialties and sub-specialties. These include obstetrics and gynaecology, general surgery, orthopaedic surgery, ear, nose and throat (ENT), and ophthalmology. Various ancillary services such as rehabilitation therapy and imaging services are also available.

== History ==
Parkway East Hospital began its operations in 1942 and was known as the Paglar Clinic and Maternity Hospital. It was founded by Dr Charles Joseph Pemberton Paglar, a Eurasian general practitioner. In 1974, his descendants sold the hospital to an Englishman, Dr Leo Taylor, and it was renamed Saint Mark's Maternity Hospital.

Two years later, the hospital was sold to Hong Leong Group for residential purposes. However, the land was zoned for hospital use. Another doctor, Dr Sundarson, together with a group of businessmen and doctors bought the property from Hong Leong.

The new owners refurbished and modernised the existing facilities, and renamed it Saint Mark's Hospital. The 45-bed hospital commenced operations in 1974 with Obstetrics and Gynaecology wards. In 1977, Dr Yahya Cohen together with American Medical International (AMI) entered a joint venture with the former to form Saint Mark's AMI Pte Ltd.

Saint Mark's Hospital further expanded with a purchase of a 40,000 sqft site adjacent to the existing building in 1982. With the expansion, the hospital's capacity also increased to 49 beds. In 1983, AMI took over the hospital and it was renamed The American Hospital of Singapore.

After many years of operation, the hospital was acquired by Parkway Holdings Limited and was renamed East Shore Hospital. Under the new management, East Shore Hospital became a general acute care hospital integrated with a medical specialist centre and a 24-hour clinic. In 2010, East Shore Hospital was renamed Parkway East Hospital.

== Medical High School programme ==
Sixty high school students aged 15 to 18 from Victoria Junior College, Victoria School and Dunman High School participated in a "Medical High School" training programme sponsored by the hospital in March and April 2015. The students experienced first hand the world of a medical professional and got to chance to participate in some medical emergency scenarios. The idea of the programme, according to hospital CEO Phua Tien Beng, was to allow the students "to actually experience working in a hospital with real patients".

== Initiatives ==
One of the initiatives organized by Parkway East Hospital is the Doctor For a Day (DFAD). It is an event designed for children living in the East to role-play as doctors in a real hospital setting. The objective of the event is to educate and inspire children to be part of the medical community. The first event was conducted in April 2014.

== Partnerships ==
In 2013, Pathway Genomics Corporation, a San Diego–based clinical laboratory that offers genetic testing services internationally, partnered with Parkway Laboratory Services Ltd, an ancillary service of Parkway Pantai Limited to offer Pathway Fit, a comprehensive saliva-based nutrigenetic test that reports on a patient's genetic propensity for diet, nutritional needs, metabolic health factors and food reactions. 2013 also saw the formation of a partnership between Sengenics, a genetic diagnostics company and Parkway Laboratory Services to provide genetic tests in Singapore including Sengenics CardioSURE Heart disease genetic risk test and Sequenom's MaterniT21 PLUS non-invasive pre-natal diagnostic test that covers Trisomy 21, 18 and 13.

In 2014, Parkway East Hospital, together with other hospitals under the group of Parkway Hospitals, works in close partnership with Parkway Patient Assistance Centre in providing services.

== Innovations ==
Parkway East Hospital adopted the Electronic Medical Records (EMR) and implemented it in 2015. It is implemented with the intention of reducing paper wastage by having a centralized storage for patients' details and medical records.

The Closed Loop Medication Management (CLMM) and Knowledge-Based Medication Administration (KBMA) modules were rolled out in 2016 and 2017 respectively to enhance the accuracy of the order and administration of medications to patients.

Electronic Meal Ordering System (eMOS) was implemented in 2016 to transform a manual paper-based meal ordering process into a fully integrated electronic meal ordering system. This involves a tablet application for food ordering service, back end application for hospital kitchen operations, nutrition and dietary management as well as automated food allergy checking. This system aims to improve the efficiency of the meal ordering process.
