= Rex Shelley =

Singaporean author (1930–2009)

- Born: Rex Anthony Shelley; 27 October 1930; Singapore, Straits Settlements
- Died: 21 August 2009 (aged 78); Singapore
- Education: University of Malaya (1952); University of Cambridge
- Occupations: Author; engineer
- Writing career
- Period: 1984–2009
- Genres: Fiction (novels) and non-fiction
- Subjects: Eurasian community in Singapore; Japanese culture; Singlish
- Notable works: The Shrimp People (1991); People of the Pear Tree (1993); Island in the Centre (1995); A River of Roses (1998)
- Notable awards: Bintang Bakti Masyarakat (Public Service Star, 1978; Bar, 1979); National Book Development Council Award (1992, 1994, 1996); Dymocks Singapore Literature Prize (2000); S.E.A. Write Award (2007)

Rex Anthony Shelley (27 October 1930 – 21 August 2009) was a Singaporean author. A graduate of the University of Malaya in Malaysia and Cambridge trained in engineering and economics, Shelley managed his own business and also worked as member of the Public Service Commission (PSC) for over 30 years. For his service, he was conferred the Bintang Bakti Masyarakat (Public Service Star) by the Government of Singapore in 1978, and an additional Bar the next year.

Shelley started writing fiction late in life, publishing his first novel, The Shrimp People, in 1991 at the age of sixty one. The first substantial work by a Singaporean writer about the Eurasian community in Singapore, it was highly commended by The Straits Times and won the 1992 National Book Development Council of Singapore (NBDCS) Award. The books People of the Pear Tree (1993), Island in the Centre (1995) and A River of Roses (1998), on the same theme, followed within a decade; respectively, they won NBDCS Highly Commended Awards in 1994 and 1996, and the Dymocks Singapore Literature Prize in 2000. In 2007 he was the Singaporean winner of the S.E.A. Write Award. Critics have responded positively to his writing, noting its "passionate, humane" style, and observing how his breadth of life experience gave rise to a talent for characterisation plus an ability to blend "a sharp sense of observed commentary with historical detail".

== Early life and education ==
Rex Shelley was born on 27 October 1930 in Singapore, and was of mixed English, Portuguese, Malay and Buginese ancestry. His father was a shipyard worker and his mother a teacher. Shelley was educated at St. Anthony's Catholic School, and at a Japanese language school for a year during the Japanese occupation of Singapore (1942–1945).

Shelley's first employment was as a carpenter's apprentice, in a shipyard. Following World War II, he graduated from the University of Malaya in Singapore in 1952 with an honours degree in chemistry, which he completed on a university scholarship. He later read engineering and economics at the University of Cambridge, where he was involved in left-wing student politics for a time.

== Career ==
After graduating, Shelley worked in Seremban in Negeri Sembilan, Malaysia, until May 1965. He then returned to Singapore and began working for a company manufacturing pipes, subsequently starting his own machinery-importing business. He also served on the Public Service Commission (PSC) for over three decades, from 1976 to 2007. The PSC is a body created by the Constitution of Singapore that appoints, promotes, dismisses and exercises disciplinary control over public officers in Singapore. It has additional responsibility for planning and administering scholarships provided by the Government of Singapore. Shelley was involved in interviewing civil servants as well as students seeking scholarships; he wrote a book entitled How to Interview Well and Get that Job! (2004). For service to the people of Singapore, the Government conferred the Bintang Bakti Masyarakat (Public Service Star) on him in 1978, awarding an additional Bar the following year.

Shelley taught himself to speak Japanese, and edited Words mean Business: A Basic Japanese Business Glossary (1984), a new version of a book first published the year before. Subsequently, he wrote Japan (Cultures of the World series, 1990) and Culture Shock!: Japan (1993). He was also a self-taught painter and piano accordion player.

== Fiction writing ==
Shelley began writing fiction late in life, publishing his first novel The Shrimp People in 1991 at the age of sixty one. The first substantial novel by a Singaporean writer about the Eurasian community in Singapore, it was the best-selling local paperback at the Times bookshop for three consecutive weeks between 22 August and 5 September 1991, and remained in the top five until 11 December that year. The work won the National Book Development Council of Singapore Award for works in English the following year despite being up against books by established writers such as Gopal Baratham and Suchen Christine Lim. He wrote three more books, People of the Pear Tree (1993), Island in the Centre (1995) and A River of Roses (1998), on the same theme within a decade. The first two of these won National Book Development Council Highly Commended Awards in 1994 and 1996 respectively, while the last won the Dymocks Singapore Literature Prize (now known simply as the Singapore Literature Prize) in 2000.

According to poet Edwin Thumboo, an emeritus professor of the National University of Singapore, Shelley "was a sensitive and acute observer of life. Because he started writing late, the material that generated his fiction was well digested. He brought to bear on it all the insights of an engineer, businessman, administrator, public servant and a person who loved life. His character analysis was therefore penetrating, and his range of characters are fully reflective of the society he wrote about." Associate Professor Kirpal Singh of the Singapore Management University, himself a writer and literary editor, has commented that although Shelley's impact on the Singapore literary scene had been "much less than it ought to be", his body of work was significant for both the Eurasian community and the wider Singapore society:

Rex belongs to the small but significant group of writers who have articulated the experiences of the Eurasians. I think, some over-writing notwithstanding, Rex's contribution is admirable. At its best, Rex's writing is passionate, humane and highly focused. Though he generally kept a low profile, his literary works will stand the test of time, combining a sharp sense of observed commentary with historical detail.

Shelley was the 2007 Singaporean winner of the S.E.A. Write Award. In August 2009, Marshall Cavendish, a subsidiary of the Times Publishing Group, reissued Shelley's books The Shrimp People and a non-fiction work first published in 1995, Sounds and Sins of Singlish.

In 2015, The Shrimp People was selected by The Business Times as one of the Top 10 English Singapore books from 1965 to 2015, alongside titles by Arthur Yap and Daren Shiau.

== Later life ==
Shelley died of lung cancer at the Assisi Hospice in Thomson Road, Singapore, on 21 August 2009. He was survived by his wife Cora, from whom he was separated; children Michael, Linda and Martine, sisters Joy and Ruth, and six grandchildren. His last book Dr. Paglar: Everyman's Hero, a biography of his uncle, the Eurasian gynaecologist Charles Joseph Pemberton Paglar (1894–1954), was published posthumously in 2010 by The Straits Times Press.

== Works ==
=== Fiction ===
- The Shrimp People, Singapore: Times Books International, 1991, ISBN 978-981-204-292-7, (pbk.).
- People of the Pear Tree, Singapore: Times Books International, 1993, ISBN 978-981-204-449-5, (pbk.).
- Island in the Centre, Singapore: Times Books International, 1995, ISBN 978-981-204-564-5, (pbk.).
- A River of Roses, Singapore: Times Books International, 1998, ISBN 978-981-204-772-4, (pbk.).

=== Non-fiction ===
- Shelley, Rex (1984), Words Mean Business: A Basic Japanese Business Glossary, Singapore: Times Books International, ISBN 978-9971-65-147-3.
- Japan (Cultures of the World series), Singapore: Times Books International, 1990, ISBN 978-981-204-165-4.
- Culture Shock!: Japan, Singapore: Times Books International, 1993, ISBN 978-981-204-081-7, (pbk.).
- Sounds and Sins of Singlish, and other Nonsense, Singapore: Times Books International, 1995, ISBN 978-981-204-392-4, (pbk.).
- How to Interview Well and Get that Job!, Singapore: SNP, 2004, ISBN 978-981-248-026-2.
- Shelley, Rex; Chen, Fen (2010), Dr. Paglar: Everyman's Hero, Singapore: The Straits Times Press, ISBN 978-981-4266-46-8.

== See also ==
- Literature of Singapore
