= Nigel Godfrey Morris =

Senior British colonial police officer (1908–1996)

Nigel Godfrey Morris LVO CMG QPM CPM
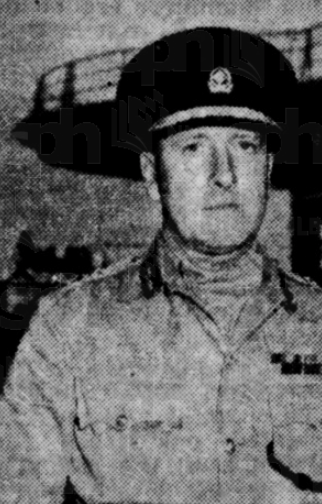
- Morris in 1953
- Born: 11 November 1908
- Died: 6 October 1996 (aged 87)
- Occupation: Senior colonial police officer
- Children: 1

Nigel Godfrey Morris (11 November 1908 – 6 October 1996) was a senior British colonial police officer. He was Commissioner of Police of Singapore and the Bahamas.

== Early life and education ==
Morris was born on 11 November 1908, the second son of Lt-Colonel G. M. Morris, 2/8th Gurkha Rifles. He was educated at Wellington College.

== Career ==
Morris joined the Straits Settlements Police Force and in 1928 was Assistant Superintendent. In 1931, he was appointed Assistant Superintendent of Police attached to the Criminal Investigation Department (CID), and that year reportedly had a narrow escape during a shoot-out with four Cantonese gunmen. In 1935, he served with the Special Branch, Singapore. In 1939, he was transferred to Penang as Assistant Superintendent of Police, Penang. From 1942 to 1945, he was interned during the Japanese occupation of Malaya.

After the World War II, Morris was repatriated but returned to Malaya in 1946 as Assistant Director of the Malayan Security Service. In 1948, he served as Director of the Special Branch, Singapore and in 1950, he was Deputy Commissioner of CID, Singapore. Following the Maria Hertogh riots in December 1950, Morris and six senior police officers, including R. Wiltshire, acting Commissioner of Police, were charged with disciplinary offences. Wiltshire was found guilty and forced to retire but Morris and the other five senior police officers were acquitted of all charges. On the departure of Wiltshire, Morris succeeded him as acting Commissioner of Police.

In 1952, he was appointed Commissioner of Police, Singapore, and during his tenure was credited with improving the training, efficiency and morale of the police force. During riots in Singapore in 1955, known as the Hock Lee bus riots, he controlled police operations "with judgement, energy and a sound sense of tactics". In recognition of his leadership and determination, and the "exemplary" conduct of all the officers under his command, he was awarded the CMG. From 1957 to 1963, he served as Deputy Inspector General of Colonial Police to the Colonial Office. In 1963, he left Malaya having been appointed Commissioner of Police of the Bahamas, and remained in the post until his retirement in 1968.

== Personal life and death ==
Morris married G. E. Baughan (née Sidebottom), widow, in 1941 and they had a daughter. After she died in 1982, he married M. C. Berkeley Owen (née Mullally), widow, in 1984.

Morris died on 6 October 1996, aged 87.

== Honours ==
In the 1949 Birthday Honours, Morris was awarded the Colonial Police Medal (CPM), and in the 1954 Birthday Honours he was awarded the Queen's Police Medal (QPM). He was appointed Companion of the Order of St Michael and St George (CMG) in the 1955 Birthday Honours. In 1966, he was appointed Member (fourth class) of the Royal Victorian Order (LVO).
