= Debus =

Debus is a French name in origin. It is commonly used as a surname. Notable people with the surname include:

- Allen G. Debus (1926–2009), American historian of science
- Bob Debus (born 1943), Australian politician
- Jon Debus (born 1958), player, coach and manager in Minor League Baseball
- Kurt H. Debus (1908–1983), NASA official

== See also ==
- Debus (crater), a crater on the far side of the Moon named for Kurt Debus
