= Island in the Centre =

Island in the Centre is a 1995 novel by Eurasian Singaporean writer Rex Shelley, which tells the story of a Japanese, Nakajima Tomio, working in Malaya from the 1920s until the Japanese Occupation of Singapore and Malaya in the 1940s. The book won a Highly Commended Award from the National Book Development Council of Singapore (NBDCS) in 1994.

== Plot ==
Nakajima Tomio is a Japanese electrical engineer working for a British firm at an estate in Kluang. In Singapore, he meets and later marries Hanako Ohara, a young Japanese prostitute from Nagasaki. After sending his wife back home during the imminent war of the Pacific, he starts an affair with Eurasian Victoria Viera, a brusque, direct girl who sells sports equipment. As the Japanese plan to take Singapore, he is enlisted by the Japanese intelligence owing to his superior knowledge of the region. Parts of the novel are written in the form of diaries kept by Nakajima, as he attempts to learn the English language.
