= People of the Pear Tree =

People of the Pear Tree is a 1993 novel by Eurasian Singaporean writer Rex Shelley, which tells the story of a Eurasian family, the Pereras, during the Japanese Occupation of Singapore and Malaya. The book won a Highly Commended Award from the National Book Development Council of Singapore (NBDCS) in 1994.

== Plot ==
The Pear Tree of the story refers to the Eurasian Perera ("pear" in Portuguese) family, whose viewpoint the story takes. The younger generation of the Perera family moves from Singapore to a Eurasian colony near Bahau, where Augustine "Gus" Perera, a young man of twenty-one, is recruited by a group of British-backed Chinese communists fighting a guerrilla war against the Japanese invaders. Meanwhile, Gus's sister, the beautiful Anna, is courted by Japanese officer Junichiro Takanashi.
