= Kampung Naga =

Traditional Sundanese village in Indonesia

Coordinates: 7.360957°S 107.992306°E

Naga Village
- Kampung Naga ᮜᮨᮙ᮪ᮘᮥᮁ ᮔᮌ (Sundanese)
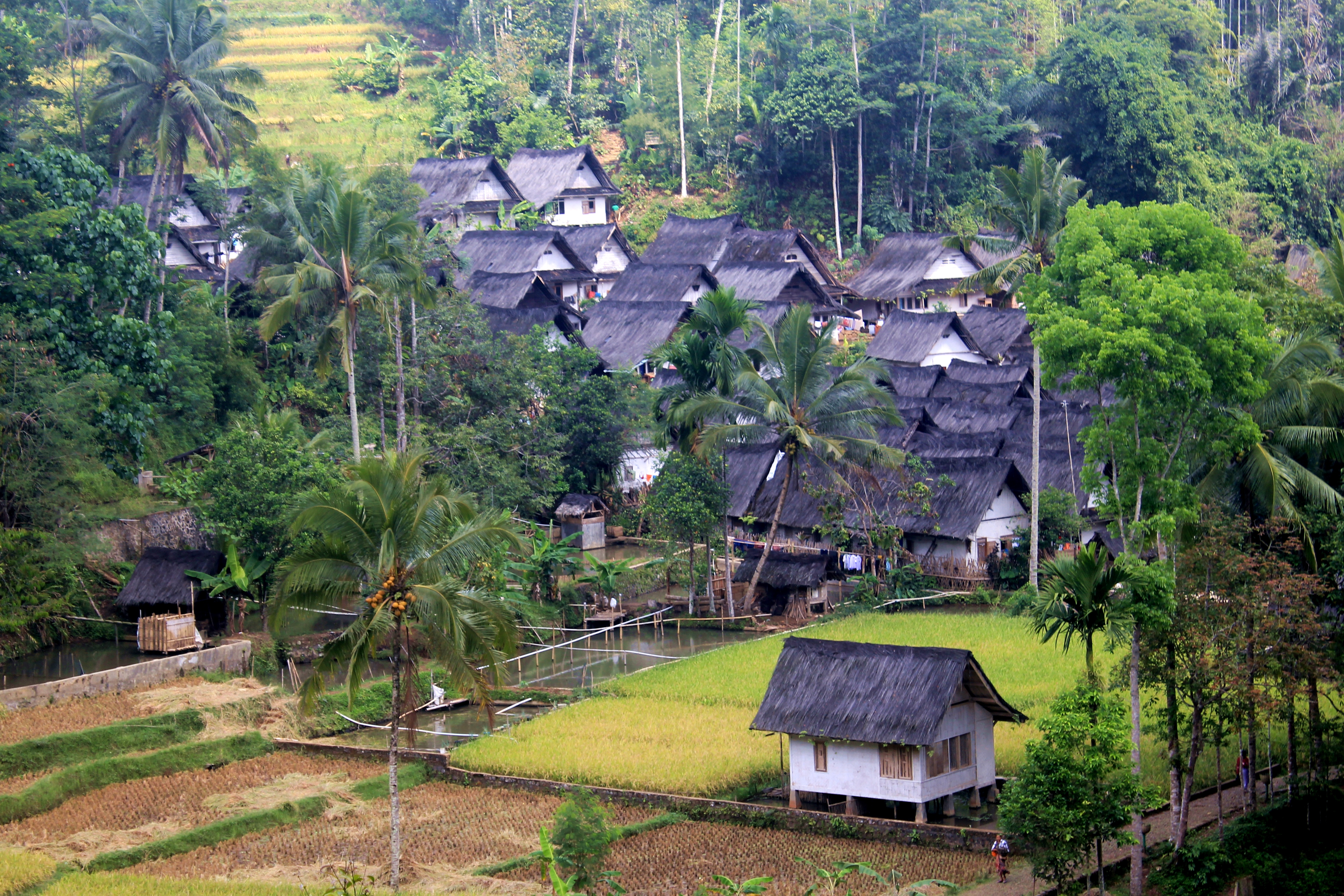
- Kampung Naga in Tasikmalaya, West Java
- Interactive map of Naga Village
- Founder: Sundanese

Naga Village (Indonesian: Kampung Naga, Indonesian pronunciation: [ˌkampʊŋ ˈnaɡa], Sundanese: ᮜᮨᮙ᮪ᮘᮥᮁ ᮔᮌ, romanized: Lembur Naga) is a traditional Sundanese hamlet located in the Neglasari Village area of Salawu district in Tasikmalaya Regency, West Java Province, Indonesia.

Kampung Naga is notable for its traditional houses which is characterized by its functionality, simplicity, modesty, and its use of natural thatched materials, and its quite faithful adherence to the harmony with the nature and environment.

== Etymology ==
Etymologically, the term "Kampung Naga" comes from Sundanese, the Sundanese people originally called the place on the edge of a cliff which in Sundanese is "dina gawir" which the locals later shortened to "nagawir" and then "naga".

== Community and traditions ==
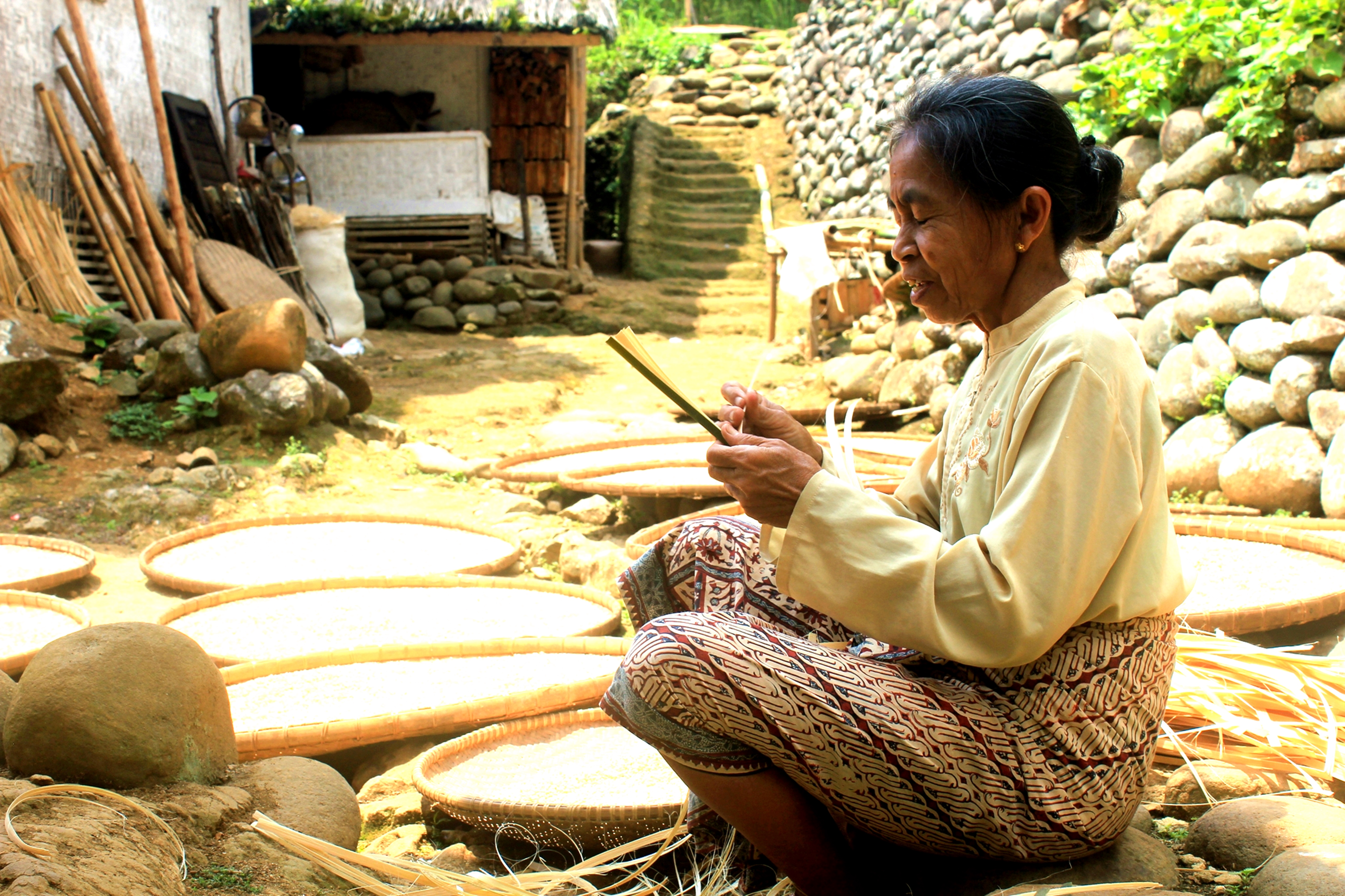
The Sundanese woman in her daily activity at Kampung Naga

Kampung Naga is a traditional village which is inhabited by Sundanese traditional community that holds a strong tradition of preserving the way of life their ancestors. The differences are quite visible when compared with other communities surrounding Kampung Naga. The community are living in an atmosphere of a traditional simplicity and environmental wisdom. The Kampung Naga community traditionally maintain the knowledge of their ancestors and their traditional lifestyles in a close harmony with nature, which extends to their construction methods; using local materials of timber, stone, bamboo, thatched materials and palm leaves.

== Location ==
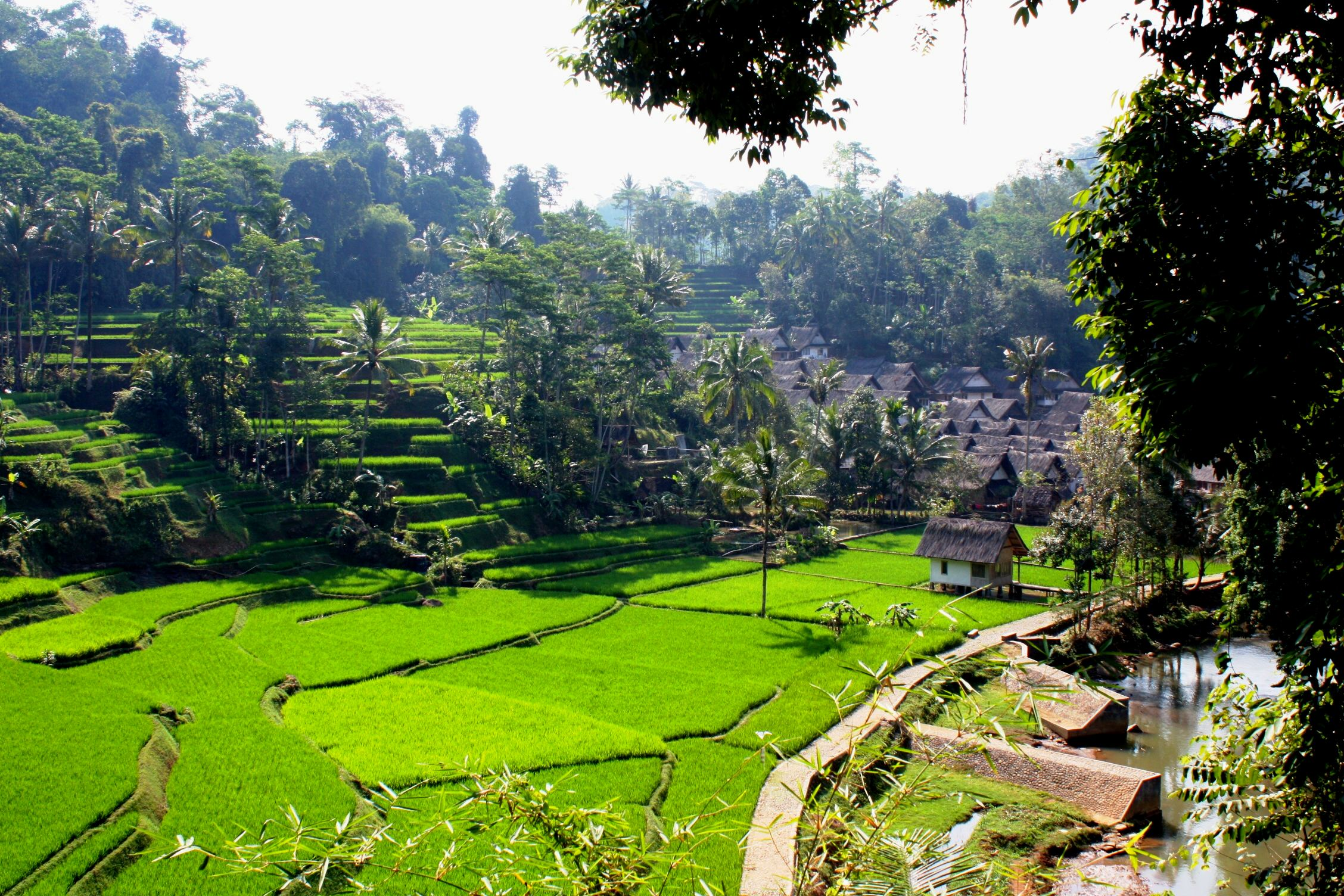
Rice paddies near the village

Kampung Naga is located not far from the main road that connects with the city of Garut and Tasikmalaya. Villages are located in a fertile valley, with the boundaries, in the West Village by Naga forest. The forest is considered sacred because it is hosts the ancestral cemetery. In the south is the rice fields, and in the north and east are surrounded by river Ciwulan, which the source of water comes from Mount Cikuray in Garut Regency.

The distance from the town of Tasikmalaya to Kampung Naga is approximately 30 kilometers, while the distance from the city of Garut is 26 kilometers. To reach Kampung Naga from Garut, Tasikmalaya, people must climb down the ladder in the wall (Sundanese: sengked) to the bank of the river Ciwulan with the slope about 45 degrees with a distance of approximately 500 meters. Then through the paths into Kampung Naga. The settlement is easier to visit than the most ancient Sundanese village in Baduy.

According to the data from Neglasari village, the surface soil of Kampung Naga is quite fertile and productive. Kampung Naga covers an area of one of half a hectares, mostly used for housings, yards, ponds, and the rest is used for agriculture rice harvested twice a year.

The preservation of the village has been supported by national government beginning during the Suharto presidency, and it has been described as part of the "public face of regulation in Suharto's Indonesia". The government provided concrete steps which connected the village to the outside world and battery powered radios as gifts for the village; tour guides were government-trained and reiterated the Naga people's desire for: self-sufficiency; the continuation of their traditions; and their desire to be model citizens.
