= Mamoru Shinozaki =

Japanese journalist, spy, military executive, businessman, and writer

- 篠崎（しのざき）護（まもる）
- Born: February 1908; Fukuoka Prefecture, Japan
- Died: 1991
- Occupations: Journalist, Spy, Military executive, Businessman, Writer
- Known for: Shinozaki Case, witness for Sook Ching trial

Mamoru Shinozaki (篠崎 護, Shinozaki Mamoru; February 1908 – 1991) was a journalist for Dentsu (later Dōmei) and spy for the Ministry of Foreign Affairs in pre-war years, a military executive in Japanese-occupied Singapore, and a businessman and writer in post-war years. He is known for the Shinozaki Case in 1940, and for his testimony in the war crimes trial in 1947 for the Sook Ching massacre.

He was also known for his autobiography, which related the history of Japanese-occupied Singapore and was criticized by many researchers and Singaporean residents for his self-praise and for alleged lies and distortions of many historical facts.

== Early life ==
Shinozaki was born in Fukuoka Prefecture in February 1908.

According to his autobiography, his father owned a coal mine in Fukuoka and was often away on business. He was raised mainly by his grandmother, who wanted him to become a monk, but his father opposed the idea. She sent him to a Buddhist temple for a year at the age of six. As a student, he was interested in socialism, secretly reading the works of Karl Marx and Friedrich Engels, a serious offense which got him expelled from his high school in Kyoto.

He studied journalism at Meiji University.

== Pre-war activity ==
After dropping out of university in 1931 or 1932, he worked as a reporter at Denpo Tsushinsha (Nippon Telegraph News Agency). In 1934 he was posted to Shanghai, and later to Nanking and Hankou.

In December 1936, he was recalled to Japan, and he became a spy for the Japanese Foreign Ministry. He was soon posted to Berlin as "assistant press attache" at the Japanese Embassy. His relationship with a German woman resulted in his reassignment to Singapore in October 1938.

While in Singapore, superficially as "press attaché" to the Japanese consul-general or a member of the staff of the Eastern News Agency, he provided "fresh and undistorted news" (i.e. propaganda) about The Empire of Japan's movement which ran from Domei News to the Singapore Herald, The Singapore Free Press and Mercantile Advertiser or such English-language newspapers published in Singapore. At the same time, he collected intelligence both on the Chinese community of Singapore by using Chinese informers, and also on the defence of Singapore by hosting parties to make connections with British Servicemen of Singapore.

On 21 September 1940, Shinozaki was arrested by the British Special Branch detectives and was subsequently charged with obtaining military intelligence from Frank Gardner, a British Serviceman. He was tried and sentenced to three years' rigorous imprisonment and a fine of $1,000, or an extra six months' simple imprisonment. Frank Gardner was sentenced to five years penal servitude and was dismissed from the service with ignominy. Kitsuji Kashiwabara, Shinozaki's cooperator, was sentenced to two months of rigorous imprisonment and was deported from Singapore.

- In his autobiography, Shinozaki wrote that he had taken Colonel T. Tanikawa, the planning chief of Japan's Imperial Army Headquarters in Tokyo, and Major Teruhito Kunitake, who was later on Tsuji Masanobu's Malaya Campaign planning staff, to locations in Singapore, Malacca and Johor to survey military installations and study the British defence capability, and that was his suspicion on his trial.

But contemporary newspapers had not mentioned to such suspicion. Furthermore, Major Kunitake in his memoir wrote that he visited Singapore to scout geopolitical situations for the first time in early 1941, when Shinozaki was already in jail.

== Second World War ==
=== Special adviser of Kempeitai ===
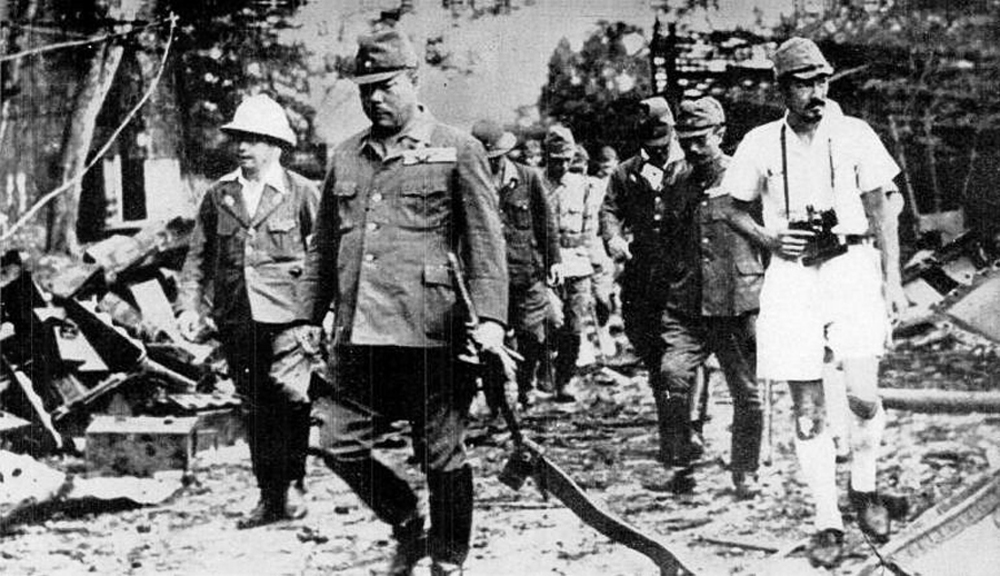
After the fall of Singapore, Shinozaki (right end) guided General Yamashita (2nd from left) to inspect battlefields of Singapore

Upon the British surrender of Singapore on 15 February 1942, Shinozaki was "released" by the Twenty-Fifth Army from Changi Prison and went on to become "special adviser" or an interpreter for the Twenty-Fifth Army's Kempeitai in Syonan and supported their actions. After the Pacific War began on 7/8 December 1941, Japanese residents of pre-war Malaya had moved to the Purana Qila internment camp. Among 32 Japanese prisoners of Changi, Shinozaki was the only person familiar with Singapore's political circumstances, so his knowledge was crucial to occupying Japanese forces.

He participated in the Sook Ching Massacre as one of the staff who tempted English-speaking Chinese leaders such as Lim Boon Keng, who was captured during the "great inspection", to cooperate with the Japanese Military Administration (JMA).

- In his autobiography, Shinozaki wrote that he voluntarily saved the Chinese leaders, but that is inconsistent with the record that Kempeitai had held 20 or more Chinese leaders to persuade them to cooperate with JMA.
- Shinozaki got Lim Boon Keng drunk with beer and made him promise to cooperate with JMA, which was the same method that was used on Frank Gardner in 1940.

He might have been engaged in the task of checking the list of people who promoted the China Relief Fund and thus who became the target of Kempeitai.

According to his autobiography, in his working capacity at the Defence Headquarters, he deliberately stored food supplies at the Thomson Road home of the Little Sisters of the Poor so that the nuns there would have a ready supply of food.

In April 1942, he continued to support the Kempeitai by identifying "hostile" residents. E. J. H. Corner wrote that when he was working in Raffles Museum, Shinozaki came to the museum to arrest Corner, because Mrs. Arbenz, a Swiss who was mentally affected by the Japanese occupation, had reported to Shinozaki that Corner was hostile to Japan.

=== Supervisor of Overseas Chinese Association ===
As the Special Advisor of Kempeitai, Shinozaki supervised Chinese leaders who were persuaded or forced to interact with JMA by founding The Overseas Chinese Association (OCA), a Japanese-sponsored body started on 2 March 1942 as the main representative of the Chinese community. The OCA was ordered to raise $50 million through compulsory "donations" although Shinozaki denied any involvement in the process in his biography.

- Shinozaki wrote that the purpose of the OCA was to rescue Chinese leaders who were confined by the 25th Army but when later Colonel Watanabe took over as the Chief Military Administrator, Shinozaki was removed from his post as the adviser to the OCA. Then, Takase and Wee Twee Kim abused the OCA to promote the $50M "donation". But Shinozaki's remark was inconsistent with many, similar associations that already existed in the Malay Peninsula through the Malayan Campaign, which was fought from December 1941 to January 1942. All of them were used to promote the "donations". He remarked that he left the OCA in early March 1942 because Colonel Managi, the head of JMA, was moved to Borneo, but Managi remained in Singapore until 8 April 1942, when the "donations" had already been undertaken in Singapore.

He mainly managed English-speaking Chinese leaders, though Takase and Wee Twee Kim oppressed Chinese-speaking Chinese leaders during the same period. He also said that he made the list of persons who were not sustainable to the burden of the "donation" before he left the OCA.

=== Chief Education Officer ===
Until June 1942, during the period when JMA's official staff hadn't arrived from Japan, Shinozaki was relocated to the Syonan municipal office as the Chief Education Officer. While the schools were still inactive, for the ceremony of The Emperor's Birthday scheduled to be held on 29 April 1942, Shinozaki taught children to sing Kimigayo and Aikoku Kōshinkyoku to please General Yamashita.

In June 1942, Shinozaki returned to Japan. According to his autobiography, he met with Shigenori Tōgō, Minister of Foreign Affairs, who rewarded his long imprisonment with "a thick wad of cash".

=== Chief Welfare Officer ===
In August 1942, he went back to Singapore and became the Chief Welfare Officer of the Syonan municipal office.

- According to an interview of Shinozaki which was recorded in 1981, his task was to help the unemployed, provide financing, hold events which contributed to the welfare of civilians, protect the civilians from the Japanese Army or Kempeitai, and other miscellaneous tasks.
- According to his 1976 autobiography, the main task of the Welfare Office was to plan labor contributions for an assortment of Japanese defense projects.
- Shinozaki also wrote that he still managed Japanese-sponsored associations which were organized by different ethnic groups, such as the OCA or the Eurasian Welfare Association(EWA) under Dr. Charles Joseph Pemberton Paglar.

In this period, the Welfare Office issued "thousands of Good Citizen's Ticket" which was necessary to travel to the suburbs of Singapore (that was not to rescue the people from the threat of Sook Ching).

In mid 1943, M.Gaus, who was from Sumatera and had been a member of Malayan Welfare Association (MWA), was called by Shinozaki, who had supervised each "Welfare Associations", and attended a meeting. There were other members of MWA and the meeting was called to criticize Gaus. During the meeting, Gaus was blamed by Shinozaki for his opinion, which was based on Melayu Raya's attempt to disturb the unity of Malayan society. Shinozaki angrily requested Gaus to cooperate to maintain the unity of Malayan society because the "Holy War" was ongoing. Gaus wrote that he was confused by Shinozaki's groundless criticism.

==== "Evacuation" ====
In September 1943, due to Operation Jaywick, the Southern Expeditionary Army Group became anxious about the recapture operation of the Allied army and the residents of Singapore, especially the Chinese and Eurasian residents. The Kempeitai started the Double Tenth incident and S.E.A.G. directed to Syonan municipal the "evacuation" of civilians.

- Shinozaki wrote that Naito Kan'ichi, the then Mayor of Syonan, told Shinozaki to carry out that mission and said that "I've heard the rumor that in Hong Kong they throw the civilians into the sea, but I don't want to do that. Please take measures which wouldn't let the civilians feel uneasy and forced."

Shinozaki suggested to the OCA and the EWA the "settlement" plan, on the surface was for the purpose of filling up the shortage of food.

- Shinozaki also wrote that he was reluctant to let the Eurasians move to Bahau, but Bishop Adrian Devals of the Catholic Church was eager to go there.

Shinozaki told them to look for participants, advertising that the "settlement" was free from Kempeitai monitoring and was abundant with soil and crops, that it was utopia. Then, they sent the Chinese and Eurasian residents that applied for the plan, who were seen as "hostile" to the JMA, to Endau ("New Syonan"), where sufficient irrigation facilities was lacking until re-development by Japanese POWs in 1946, and Bahau("Fuji-go"), where Malayan policemen were always monitoring the "settlers" and many died from malaria.

When dawn broke the glowing picture that was painted by those responsible for the scheme took on the complexion of a bad dream. Yes, they had been lured to their doom. These were the fruits of the Japanese Occupation. Before their very eyes lay not fertile valleys that could be profitably tilled, not the Utopia that Shinozaki and company had lectured them on, not wells that produced sparkling water within a few feet of the earth's surface. There, all around, the ugly, virulent Pahang jungle reared its treetops: jungle, jungle, everywhere! Fuji-go was nothing more than a clearing four miles square in extent and not even that, for the giants of the forest that had been felled lay exactly where they were when cut down.

— Van Cuylengurg, Singapore through sunshine and shadow,

Bishop Devals got sick and died from overwork in January 1945 at a hospital of Seremban.

Shinozaki wrote (and it was believed by some) that he sent foods to the "settlers" and retained a lifeline of them.

- His "humanitarian acts" have been recorded by Yap Pheng Geck, his contact with Shinozaki came in connection with the Endau Scheme. Yap found him to be sincere in wanting to promote the local people's welfare and even risked his neck sometimes with the Japanese military police, interceding for the Chinese people and also rendering the same services to Eurasians.
- Eurasian doctor John Bertram van Cuylenburg, his contact with Shinozaki came in connection with the Bahau, marveled that a man like Shinozaki, who had spied for his country and been sentenced and jailed by the British, would want to do his best to lessen the sufferings of the Singapore people.

But Professor Yamada had claimed that Shinozaki wrote of himself like the man behind the "evacuation" plan. Yamada was the then chief of Headquarter of Syonan Evacuation Plan, and he wrote that "Shinozaki wrote that we did a good thing, "evacuation" of Singapore residents. I don't know Shinozaki might be responsible for the plan originally, but I know that the one actually involved was me, and not him. Shinozaki touched nothing. So he doesn't know the detail of things, though I know them."

Though JMA advertised that the "settlement" might resolve the food shortage, the "settling" population was limited to 1,200-1,500 through the Japanese Occupation period, so "settlement" was not effective in this point of view. In 1944, as the reality of the "settlement" (few actual benefits, need to wait for food from Syonan, and rampant malaria) was orally spread to Singapore, people applying to be "settlers" declined sharply. Shinozaki, in his autobiography, didn't refer to such situations and blamed the MPAJA saying that they disturbed Endau and Eurasians by being lazy in Bahau. But despite the terrible situations of "settlement", especially in Bahau, Syonan municipal didn't desert the "settlement" and return the "settlers" back to Singapore, because the true purpose was to "evacuate" the residents.

In July 1945, Shinozaki urged Singaporeans to "evacuate" immediately.

All sensible people should be able to understand the true intentions of the authorities and the serious circumstances all may be placed in. Later the people will understand the good intentions of the authorities and have cause to thank them.

— Shinozaki's declaration at a meeting of JMA on 26 July 1945, Syonan Shimbun

=== Sub Chief of Auxiliary Police ===
On 26 July 1945, Shinozaki was appointed to Sub Chief of Auxiliary Police Force.

== Post-war years ==
=== The Witness of Sook Ching Massacre ===
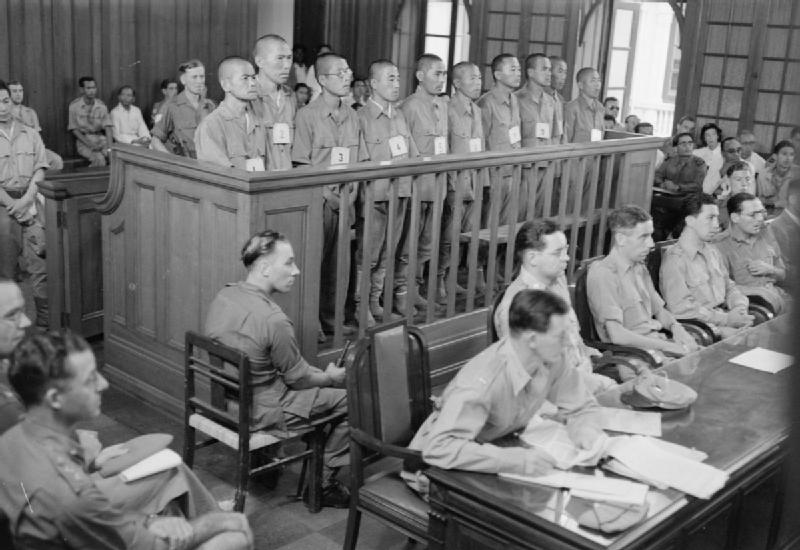
first war crimes trial to be held in South East Asia Command at the Singapore Supreme Court on 21 January 1946

After the Japanese surrender, Shinozaki was captured from the Japanese internment camp in Jurong but he was soon released and began to help the British Field Security Force during the War Crimes Trials as an interpreter and prosecution witness. According to his autobiography, it was because so many survivors in Singapore vouched for his exemplary behavior.

However, according to some newspaper articles at that time, Shinozaki was one of a hundred Japanese residents of pre-war Malaya who had applied to remain in Singapore. Because he was ruled guilty as a spy in 1940, there was little hope of approval, so he cooperated with the British Field Security Force by prosecuting his colleague, a member of the Kempeitai as a war criminal, to obtain forgiveness for himself.

In 1946, public opinion was not against to him, because he apologized for the fault of JMA and the Sook Ching Massacre, and he agreed to compensate for those crimes. He also argued the Collaborator Case in January 1946 for Dr. Pagular, the leader of EWA, and said: "Please punish me".

But his testimony at the War Criminal Court of Sook Ching Massacre in 1947 drew strong protests from Singaporean residents. In Court, though he was one of the prosecution witnesses, he said that Saburo Kawamura, commander of the Syonan Defence Garrison and who was the commander of Sook Ching Massacre, had ordered Shinozaki to save thousands of Chinese and Eurasians and that he had complied. He also said that each of the three defendants who were facing the death penalty had very kind and merciful characters, but were following orders.

... His lip service to humanity is nauseating at this juncture; if he had the courage of his convictions, why didn't he speak out at the time of the atrocities? Ask any political victim of the Kempeitai what Shinozaki did for them.

— The People's Postbag; Letters To The Editor, Malaya Tribune, 15 February 1947

Chuang Hui Tsuan blamed Shinozaki as the "wire-puller" of Sook Ching Massacre, required that all the defendants be executed and that Shinozaki be deported from Singapore. Though not all of the defendants were sentenced to death, Shinozaki was deported from Singapore in 1948. He was blocked from re-entering Singapore until 1973, though other Japanese people were allowed back from 1953.

=== Sales of autobiography ===
In February 1972, New Nation reported that Shinozaki returned to Singapore as an industrialist, and that he had just completed a book.

His memoir in Japanese was first published serially on Southern Cross, the journal of The Japanese Association, Singapore from Jul./Aug. 1972 to Mar./Apr. 1974. From 28 August 1972 to 5 October 1972, his autobiography was translated into Chinese by Chin Kah Chong, published serially on Nanyang Siang Pau. Then in May 1973, the Chinese version of his autobiography was published in the book form (Shinozaki 1973z), which was reprinted in June 1973 and in August 1973.

In the same year, he was interviewed by Lim Yoon Lin of the Institute of South-East Asian Studies for its oral history programme and the record of the interview, which was written in English, (Shinozaki 1973e) was published.

From July 1974 to December 1974, the Japanese version of his autobiography was published serially on Syokun!, a Japanese journal by Bungeishunjū. It was published in the book form in 1976 (Shinozaki 1976).

In 1975, the English version of his autobiography Syonan - My Story was published by Asia Pacific Press. His autobiography was later reprinted in 1982.

=== Criticisms ===
==== Self-praise ====
On 1 November 1972, on Sin Chew Daily, Chuang Hui Tsuan wrote an article which criticized Shinozaki's self-praising in his autobiography. Then in 1973, on Sin Chew Daily, Lee Kim Chuan and Qing Mu-duan also criticized Shinozaki for his boastfulness.

==== Distorting the function of "Good Citizen's Ticket" and the purpose of OCA foundation ====
On 18 June 1973, Wu You on Nanyang Siang Pau criticized Shinozaki's autobiography as unworthy as a historical resource of Singapore, and to allow their history to depend on his autobiography was a fearful thing. He wrote that Shinozaki wrote about saving the life of one person, which was his heroic and voluntary action, but didn't write about JMA killing and afflicting hundreds of citizens and Shinozaki implementing it as a member of staff of JMA. On 7 July 1973, on Nanyang Siang Pau, Shinozaki pleaded to Wu You that he merely wrote of his own experiences. Then Wu You again criticized Shinozaki for distorting their painful history. He pointed out that the "Good Citizen's Ticket" was not so special but required for all staff who cooperated with JMA during the occupation period, so each member of the Japanese staff of Syonan Municipal, not only Shinozaki but other staff too got it. He also criticized Shinozaki for writing that the OCA was founded to save the life of Chinese leaders. Anybody who lived through that period knew that the Japanese Army, after occupying Malayan City, set up a "Security Preservation Committee" or similar organization, so Singapore couldn't be an exception.

On 30 and 31 July 1973, Tan Y. S. on Nanyang Siang Pau commented that Shinozaki's autobiography wrote many things about JMA which Tan didn't know, but Shinozaki didn't know the sorrows of Singaporean citizens. Then he corrected some "mistakes" of Shinozaki based on Tan's own experience and asked readers to report their own experiences to compare with what Shinozaki wrote.

==== Hiding true aim of "evacuation" ====
On 28 August 1973, Wu Cha on Nanyang Siang Pau followed Tan Y.S., he pointed out that he heard from credible sources that when JMA let Singaporean leaders move to the "settlements", they made a "Black List" and was prepared, if the Allied Army landed Malay Peninsula, to immediately kill the people on that list. Shinozaki referred to the "evacuation" plan, but the fact that he didn't refer to its true aim was unnatural. If he had forgotten to write the dark side of JMA, he could understand that, but if the distortion and fabrication of history had been done intentionally, he couldn't forgive that. Then he also asked readers to tell and record their experiences to debunk the lies of Shinozaki.

==== Ashamed ====
On 12 September 1973, Lee Kim Chuan on Nanyang Siang Pau criticized Shinozaki, that though he was in Force 136 and was not in Singapore during the War, what was written in Shinozaki's autobiography was far different from what he had heard from his friends in Singapore or from the evidence of the War Criminal Court. Writing such a self-praising book was shameful behavior.

In November 1974 on Science of Thought, a Japanese journal, Hiroshi Tanaka introduced the series of articles from Singaporean Newspapers which criticized Shinozaki's autobiography. He translated some of them.

==== Too many Japanese dead in British PoW camps ====
In May 1975, a writer of New Nation doubted the credibility of Shinozaki's autobiography when he had written that 10,000 Japanese prisoners had died in Singapore, in British PoW camps after the war. He interviewed Shinozaki, but Shinozaki gave no explanation for how he had arrived at that number.

==== Opportunistic remarks to the estimate of victims ====
In June 1983, Chua Ser Koon on Lianhe Zaobao pointed that Shinozaki in his Chinese autobiography (Shinozaki 1973z) admitted that the estimate of victims "which was recorded by the Chinese Chamber of Commerce" was relatively accurate compared with what the Japanese Occupied Army had argued, but in his Japanese autobiography (Shinozaki 1976), he wrote that because the number of victims "which was recorded by the Chinese Chamber of Commerce" contained an estimate of dead during the Battle of Singapore, Japanese might feel the accumulation unacceptable, and the estimate of Sook Ching victims "by the Chinese Chamber of Commerce" was inaccurate. Shinozaki in his Chinese autobiography agreed that the estimate by the Chinese Chamber of Commerce was only to seek Chinese readers' favour, his true point of view was not so different from what Japanese Kempei-tai had claimed.

== Legacy ==
There is no detailed information about what Shinozaki did in his later years. In 1978 he was interviewed by Yoji Akashi at Hirakata, Osaka. Up to 1983, he wrote some articles about the modern history of Singapore which were published in Japanese magazines such as "Shi (History)" by "Gendai-shi Konwakai (social meeting on modern history)" and he took part in the Japan Safety Appliances Association. He died in 1991.

Chuang Hui Tsuan, who protested the deportation of Shinozaki and who first criticized Shinozaki's autobiography, collected the materials about the history of Japanese occupation period and then committed the editorial to Professor Hsu Yun Tsiao of Nanyang University. Though Chuang died in 1974 and Hsu died in 1981, Chua Ser Koon continued editing and in 1984 the book titled Xin Ma Huaren Kangri Shiliao (Malayan Chinese Resistance to Japan) 1937-1945 was published to tell the experiences of the Singaporean citizens who lived through the period of Japanese occupation and to tell the "true history" to the next generation.

In 1987, Hara (1987) again criticized many distortions of Shinozaki's autobiography and warned that there are still many books in Japan which are misleading about the history of Japanese-Occupied Singapore and some of them referenced Shinozaki's autobiography.

Afterwards, Singaporeans started to call Shinozaki the "Schindler" of Singapore.
