= Sook Ching =

1942 massacre in Singapore by Japan

Sook Ching (肃清)
- Part of the Japanese occupation of Singapore and Malaya of World War II
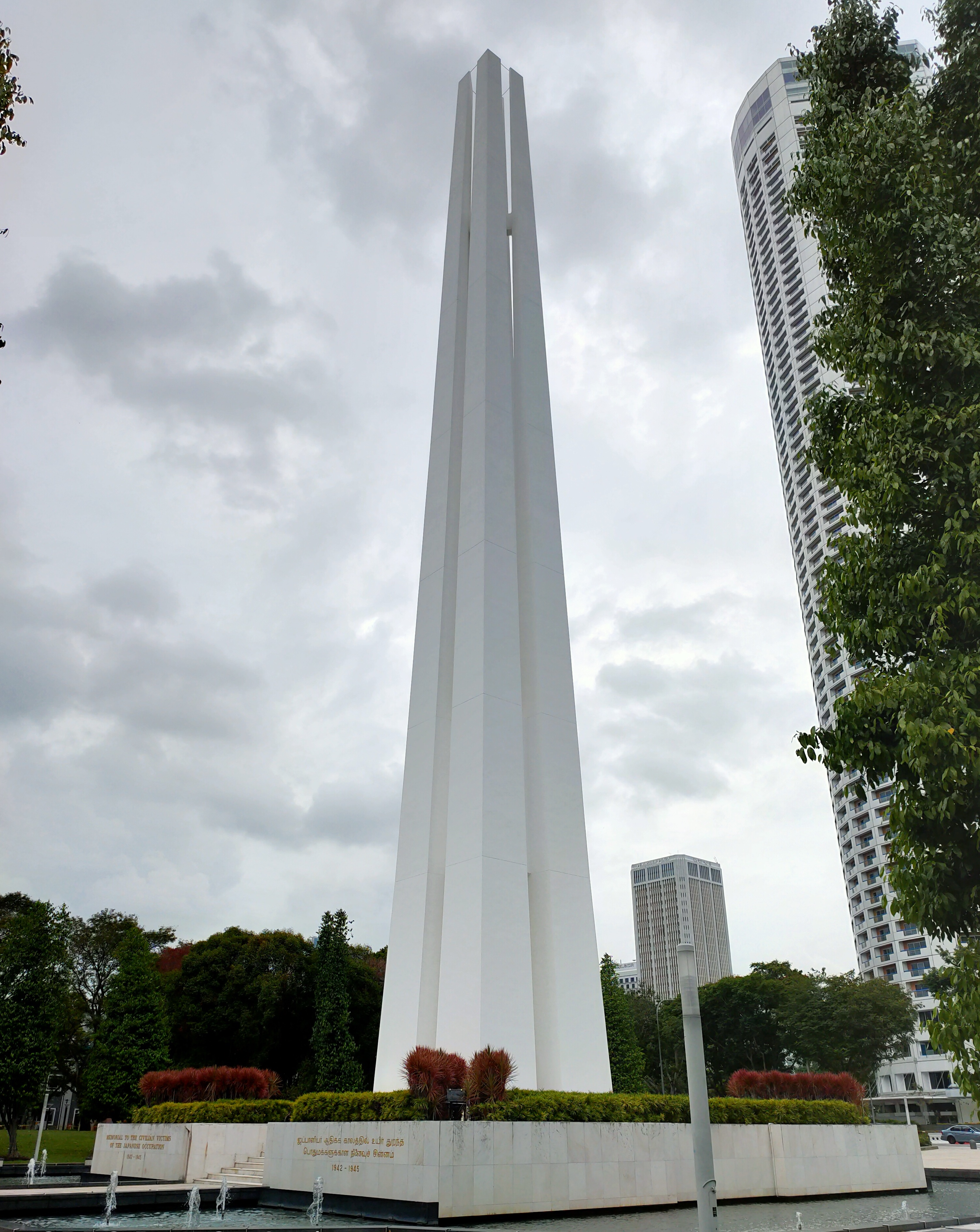
- Civilian War Memorial, dedicated to the victims of Sook Ching and the wider occupation
- Location: Japanese-occupied Singapore (Note: Killings were eventually also targeted in Malaya.)
- Date: 18 February 1942 – 4 March 1942 (Note: Planned between 28 January 1942 and 4 February 1942) (UTC+08:00)
- Target: Identify and eliminate suspected "anti-Japanese elements"; with specific targets for Chinese Singaporeans or others perceived as a threat to the Japanese
- Attack type: Systematic purge and massacre
- Deaths: 40,000 to 50,000 (consensus and retrospective analysis) (Note: Ranges from 6,000–25,000 (Japanese figures) to 70,000–100,000 (Singaporean figures) with specific targets for Chinese and Peranakan males)
- Injuries: Unknown
- Perpetrators: Empire of Japan; Kempeitai within the Imperial Japanese Army: Gen. Tomoyuki Yamashita; Col. Masanobu Tsuji; Hayashi Tadahiko
- Motive: Anti-Chinese sentiment and revenge killings for overseas Chinese support for China during the Second Sino-Japanese War

Sook Ching (Note: simplified Chinese: 肃清; traditional Chinese: 肅清; pinyin: Sùqīng; Jyutping: suk1 cing1; Pe̍h-ōe-jī: Siok-chheng; lit. 'elimination' or simplified Chinese: 肃清大屠杀; traditional Chinese: 肅清大屠殺; pinyin: Sùqīng Dà Túshā; Jyutping: suk1 cing1 daai6 tou4 saat3; Pe̍h-ōe-jī: Siok-chheng Tāi-tôo-sat; lit. 'cleansing purge' or 'elimination massacre')) was a mass killing that occurred from 18 February to 4 March 1942 in Singapore after it fell to the Japanese. It was a systematic purge and massacre of 'anti-Japanese' elements in Singapore, with the Singaporean Chinese particularly targeted by the Japanese army during the occupation. However, Japanese soldiers engaged in indiscriminate killing and did not try to identify who was 'anti-Japanese.'

Singapore was a crucial strategic point in World War II. From 8 February to 15 February, the Japanese fought for control of the city. The combined British and Commonwealth forces surrendered in a stunning defeat to the outnumbered Japanese on 15 February which led to its fall. The loss of Singapore was and still is Britain's largest surrender in history.

Three days later after the fall, on 18 February, the occupying Japanese military began mass killings of a wide range of "undesirables", who were mostly ethnic Chinese, influenced by the events of the Second Sino-Japanese War that was raging simultaneously as far back as 1937. The operation was overseen by the Imperial Japanese Army's Kempeitai, its secret police. Along with Singapore, the Sook Ching was subsequently also extended to include the Chinese population in Malaya, which was also under occupation by the Japanese. Concurrently, non-Chinese individuals were also not completely spared in other parts of Asia under Japanese occupation. The Japanese also brutally subjugated civilians in Burma and Thailand, with estimates of up to 90,000 additional deaths. Many of these victims were also forced to work on the Siam–Burma Railway, infamously known as the Death Railway.

The aim for such a purge was to intimidate the Chinese community, which was considered by the Japanese to be potentially the main centre of resistance to Japanese aims of territorial expansion throughout the Asia-Pacific. The Japanese had also thought of it as a "revenge" for their perceived anti-Japanese activity in the Sinophone regions, such as procuring financial aid for China after the Japanese invasion of Manchuria and during the Second Sino-Japanese War. As a consequence, Sook Ching was aimed primarily at Chinese political and social activists, volunteers fighting on the side of the Allies, (Note: Including non-Chinese individuals.) as well as representatives of Chinese triads. In practice, however, the arrests and executions were carried out by the Japanese in a completely arbitrary manner, with many civilians randomly killed in summary executions even if they took no part in any organised resistance.

After the war, the Japanese authorities acknowledged that the massacre took place, but disagreed about the number of deaths that Japan had caused. Japan alleged that no more "than 6,000 deaths" had occurred, while Singapore's first prime minister Lee Kuan Yew, who was himself almost a victim to Sook Ching, stated that verifiable numbers would put it at "about 70,000", including the figures in Malaya. When mass graves were discovered in 1962, Singaporeans heavily lobbied for their government to demand compensation as well as an official apology from the Japanese government. On 25 October 1966, the Japanese government ultimately agreed to reimburse S$50 million in reparations, half of which constituting as a grant and the rest as a loan. However, the wording used for this reimbursement was classified as a "gesture of atonement", with words such as "damages" or "reparations" being avoided by the Japanese. Furthermore, the Japanese government continued to refuse to accept legal responsibility for the massacre, which would include carrying out an official investigation or inquiry of the deaths. No official apology was made.

Remains of Sook Ching victims would subsequently continue to be unearthed by Singaporeans for decades after the massacre. In 1963, the Civilian War Memorial was constructed in memory of the civilians killed during the occupation, including Sook Ching. Remains belonging to some of the victims were also placed in a tomb under the memorial. In 1992, the various Sook Ching massacre sites around the country such as Changi Beach, Katong, Punggol Point, Tanah Merah and Sentosa were designated with historic plaque markers as heritage sites by the Singaporean government's National Heritage Board, to commemorate the 50th anniversary of the occupation.

== Etymology ==
=== Japan ===
The Japanese referred to the Sook Ching as the Kakyō Shukusei (華僑粛清, 'purging of Overseas Chinese') or as the Shingapōru Daikenshō (シンガポール大検証, 'great inspection of Singapore'). The current Japanese term for the massacre is Shingapōru Kakyō Gyakusatsu Jiken (シンガポール華僑虐殺事件, 'Singapore Overseas Chinese Massacre').

=== Singapore ===
Singapore's National Heritage Board (NHB) uses the term Sook Ching in its publications. In Chinese languages, the term (肅清) means, among other things, "eradication" or "purge".

== Planning of the massacre ==
According to postwar testimony taken from Colonel Hishakari Takafumi, a war correspondent embedded with the 25th army, an order to kill 50,000 Chinese, 20 percent of the total, was issued by senior officials on Yamashita's operations staff, either from Lieutenant Colonel Tsuji Masanobu, Chief of Planning and Operations, or Major Hayashi Tadahiko, Chief of Staff.

Hirofumi Hayashi, a professor of politics at a university and the co-director of the Center for Research and Documentation on Japan's War Responsibility, writes that the massacre was premeditated, and that "the Chinese in Singapore were regarded as anti-Japanese even before the Japanese military landed". It is also clear from the passage below that the massacre was to be extended to the Chinese in Malaya as well.

The purge was planned before Japanese troops landed in Singapore. The military government section of the 25th Army had already drawn up a plan entitled "Implementation Guideline for Manipulating Overseas Chinese" on or around 28 December 1941. This guideline stated that anyone who failed to obey or co-operate with the occupation authorities should be eliminated. It is clear that the headquarters of the 25th Army had decided on a harsh policy toward the Chinese population of Singapore and Malaya from the beginning of the war. According to Onishi Satoru, the Kenpeitai officer in charge of the Jalan Besar screening centre, Kenpeitai commander Oishi Masayuki was instructed by the chief of staff, Sōsaku Suzuki, at Keluang, Johor, to prepare for a purge following the capture of Singapore. Although the exact date of this instruction is not known, the Army headquarters was stationed in Keluang from 28 January to 4 February 1942 ...

The Singapore Massacre was not the conduct of a few evil people, but was consistent with approaches honed and applied in the course of a long period of Japanese aggression against China and subsequently applied to other Asian countries. The Japanese military, in particular the 25th Army, made use of the purge to remove prospective anti-Japanese elements and to threaten local Chinese and others to swiftly impose military administration.

== Purge ==
=== Screening ===
After the fall of Singapore, Masayuki Oishi, commander of No. 2 Field Kenpeitai, set up his headquarters in the YMCA Building at Stamford Road as the Kenpeitai East District Branch. The Kenpeitai prison was in Outram with branches in Stamford Road, Chinatown and the Central Police Station. A residence at the intersection of Smith Street and New Bridge Road formed the Kenpeitai West District Branch.

Under Oishi's command were 200 regular Kenpeitai officers and another 1000 auxiliaries, who were mostly young and rough peasant soldiers. Singapore was divided into sectors with each sector under the control of an officer. The Japanese set up designated "screening centres" all over Singapore to gather and "screen" Chinese males between the ages of 18 and 50. Those who were thought to be "anti-Japanese" would be eliminated. Sometimes, women and children were also sent for inspection as well.

According to Kevin Blackburn, associate professor at Nanyang Technological University:

The screening and identification process for 'anti-Japanese' Chinese proved little more than a device to prevent Chinese resistance to a general massacre. In practice, Japanese troops did not adhere to any criteria for screening 'anti-Japanese' elements, despite an order on paper listing the types of people who were 'anti-Japanese', such as communists, volunteers who had fought with the British forces, businessmen who had financed the resistance to the Japanese invasion of China, and gangsters ...

However, the process of screening was, in practice, far more indiscriminate. At one screening center, all Chinese males who walked through one particular entrance was taken away in trucks to be shot, while those who happened to take another pathway were released.

The following passage is from an article from the National Heritage Board:

The inspection methods were indiscriminate and non-standardised. Sometimes, hooded informants identified suspected anti-Japanese Chinese; other times, Japanese officers singled out "suspicious" characters at their whim and fancy. Those who survived the inspection walked with "examined" stamped on their faces, arms or clothing; some were issued a certificate. The unfortunate ones were taken to remote places like Changi and Punggol, and unceremoniously killed in batches.

According to the A Country Study: Singapore published by the Federal Research Division of the Library of Congress:

All Chinese males from ages eighteen to fifty were required to report to registration camps for screening. The Japanese or military police arrested those alleged to be anti-Japanese, meaning those who were singled out by informers or who were teachers, journalists, intellectuals, or even former servants of the British. Some were imprisoned, but most were executed.

The ones who passed the "screening" received a piece of paper bearing the word "examined" or have a square ink mark stamped on their arms or shirts. Those who failed were stamped with triangular marks instead. They were separated from the others and packed into trucks near the centres and sent to the killing sites.

=== Execution ===
There were several sites for the killings, the most notable ones being Changi Beach, Punggol Point and Sentosa (or Pulau Belakang Mati).

Massacre sites	Description
Punggol Point	The Punggol Point Massacre saw about 300 to 400 Chinese shot on 28 February 1942 by the Hojo Kempei firing squad. The victims were some of the 1,000 Chinese men detained by the Japanese after a door-to-door search along Upper Serangoon Road. Several of these had tattoos, a sign that they might be triad members.
Changi Beach/Changi Spit Beach	On 20 February 1942, 66 Chinese males were lined up along the edge of the sea and shot by the military police. The beach was the first of the killing sites of the Sook Ching. Victims were from the Bukit Timah/Stevens Road area.
Changi Road 8-mile section (ms)	Massacre site found at a plantation area (formerly Samba Ikat village) contained remains of 250 victims from the vicinity.
Hougang 8 ms	Six lorry loads of people were reported to have been massacred here.
Katong 7 ms	20 trenches for burying the bodies of victims were dug here.
Beach opposite 27 Amber Road	Two lorry loads of people were said to have been massacred here. The site later became a car park.
Tanah Merah Beach/Tanah Merah Besar Beach	242 victims from Jalan Besar were massacred here. The site later became part of the Changi airport runway.
Sime Road off Thomson Road	Massacre sites found near a golf course and villages in the vicinity.
Katong, East Coast Road	732 victims from Telok Kurau School
Siglap area	Massacre site near Bedok South Avenue/Bedok South Road (previously known as Jalan Puay Poon)
Belakang Mati Beach, off the Sentosa Golf Course	Surrendered British gunners awaiting Japanese internment buried some 300 bullet-ridden corpses washed up on the shore of Sentosa. They were civilians who were transported from the docks at Tanjong Pagar to be killed at sea nearby.

In a quarterly newsletter, the National Heritage Board published the account of the life story of a survivor named Chia Chew Soo, whose father, uncles, aunts, brothers and sisters were bayoneted one by one by Japanese soldiers in Simpang Village.

=== Extension to Chinese community of Malaya ===
At the behest of Masanobu Tsuji, the Japanese High Command's Chief of Planning and Operations, Sook Ching was extended to the rest of Malaya. However, due to a far wider population distribution across urban centres and vast rural regions, the Chinese population in Malaya was less concentrated and more difficult to survey. Lacking sufficient time and manpower to organise a full "screening", the Japanese opted instead to conduct widespread and indiscriminate massacres of the Chinese population. The primary bulk of the killings were conducted between February and March, and were largely concentrated in the southern states of Malaya, closer to Singapore.

==== Targeted locations ====
Specific incidents were Kota Tinggi, Johore (28 February 1942) – 2,000 killed; Gelang Patah, Johor (4 March) – 300 killed; Benut, Johor (6 March) – number unknown; Johore Bahru, Senai, Kulai, Sedenak, Pulai, Renggam, Kluang, Yong Peng, Batu Pahat, Senggarang, Parit Bakau, and Muar (February–March) – estimated up to 25,000 Chinese were killed in Johor; Tanjung Kling, Malacca (16 March) – 142 killed; Kuala Pilah, Negeri Sembilan (15 March) – 76 killed; Parit Tinggi, Negeri Sembilan (16 March) – more than 100 killed (the entire village); Joo Loong Loong (near the present village of Titi) on 18 March (1474 killed, entire village eliminated by Major Yokokoji Kyomi and his troops); and Penang (April) – several thousand killed by Major Higashigawa Yoshimura. Further massacres were instigated as a result of increased guerilla activity in Malaya, most notably at Sungei Lui, a village of 400 in Jempol District, Negeri Sembilan, which was wiped out on 31 July 1942 by troops under a Corporal Hashimoto.

=== Mass murder of Tamils of Malaya and Singapore ===
The Japanese also killed about 150,000 Tamil Indians in Thailand and Myanmar during the war, although it is believed that the true number of deaths is much higher for the Tamil Indians. It excludes the death toll of the Malayali Indians. The Indians came from Singapore or Malaya under Japanese supervision.

Japanese camp guards frequently killed entire Indian families or the entire Indian population of whole camps. They also killed Indian families or camps that were infected with typhus, sometimes for sadistic reasons. Aside from killing the Indians, Japanese soldiers often gang raped Tamil women after which they would force other Indian coolies to rape the Indian women.

== Death toll ==
Due to the lack of concrete written records by the Japanese when orchestrating the massacre as well as many of the deaths being the result of random summary executions, the official death toll remains unknown. Japan acknowledged the massacre after the war, but alleged a death toll of about 6,000, whereas the Singaporean Chinese community as well as prime minister Lee Kuan Yew alleged a death toll of about 70,000 to 100,000.

Retrospective analysis by historians as well as the scale of mass graves that was discovered decades after the massacre ranges the death toll at about 25,000 to 50,000 in Singapore itself, with another 20,000 civilians killed on the Malayan Peninsula. The massacre was also not perpetrated solely by the Japanese, as Taiwanese soldiers, themselves ethnic Chinese, had also actively participated in the killings and acted as undercover agents.

According to Lieutenant Colonel Hishakari Takafumi, a newspaper correspondent at the time, the plan was to ultimately kill about 50,000 Chinese, and half that (25,000) had already been achieved when the order was received to scale down the operation. He said Major Hayashi Tadahiko told him that "it had been found to be impossible to kill the whole of the 50,000 people, as after half that number had been killed an order was received 'to stop the massacre.'"

Japanese historian Hirofumi Hayashi wrote in another paper:

According to the diary of the Singapore garrison commander, Major General Kawamura Saburo, the total number reported to him as killed by the various Kenpeitai section commanders on 23 February was five thousand. This was the third day of mop-up operations when executions were mostly finished. It is alleged by Singapore that the total number of innocent Chinese and Peranakan civilians killed was forty or fifty thousand; this point needs further investigations.

Having witnessed the brutality of the Japanese, Lee made the following comments:

But they also showed a meanness and viciousness towards their enemies equal to the Huns'. Genghis Khan and his hordes could not have been more merciless. I have no doubts about whether the two atom bombs dropped on Hiroshima and Nagasaki were necessary. Without them, hundreds of thousands of civilians in Malaya and Singapore, and millions in Japan itself, would have perished.

=== Prominent victims ===
Chinese film pioneer Hou Yao had emigrated to Singapore in 1940 to work for the Shaw brothers as well as to largely avoid the Japanese invasion of China. Because Hou had directed and written a number of patriotic Chinese "national defence" films against that invasion, he was targeted by the Japanese immediately after Singapore fell and killed at the beginning of the massacre.

== Aftermath ==
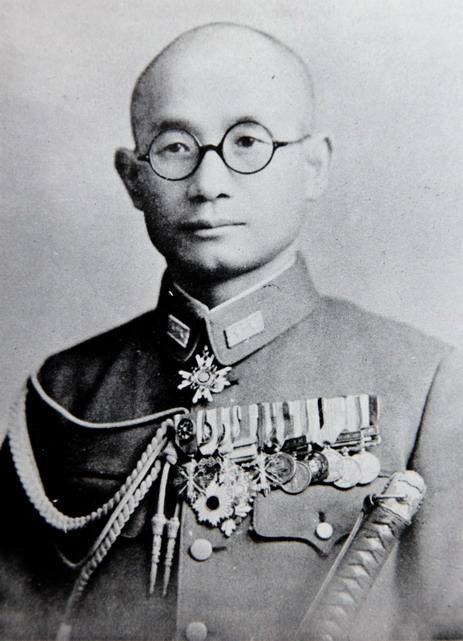
Masanobu Tsuji

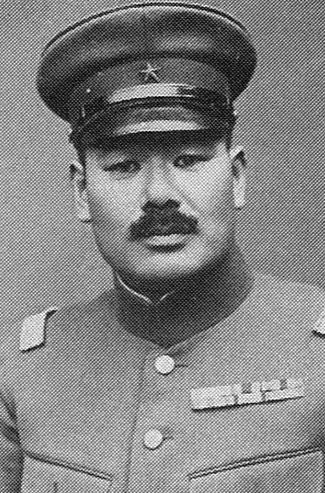
Takuma Nishimura

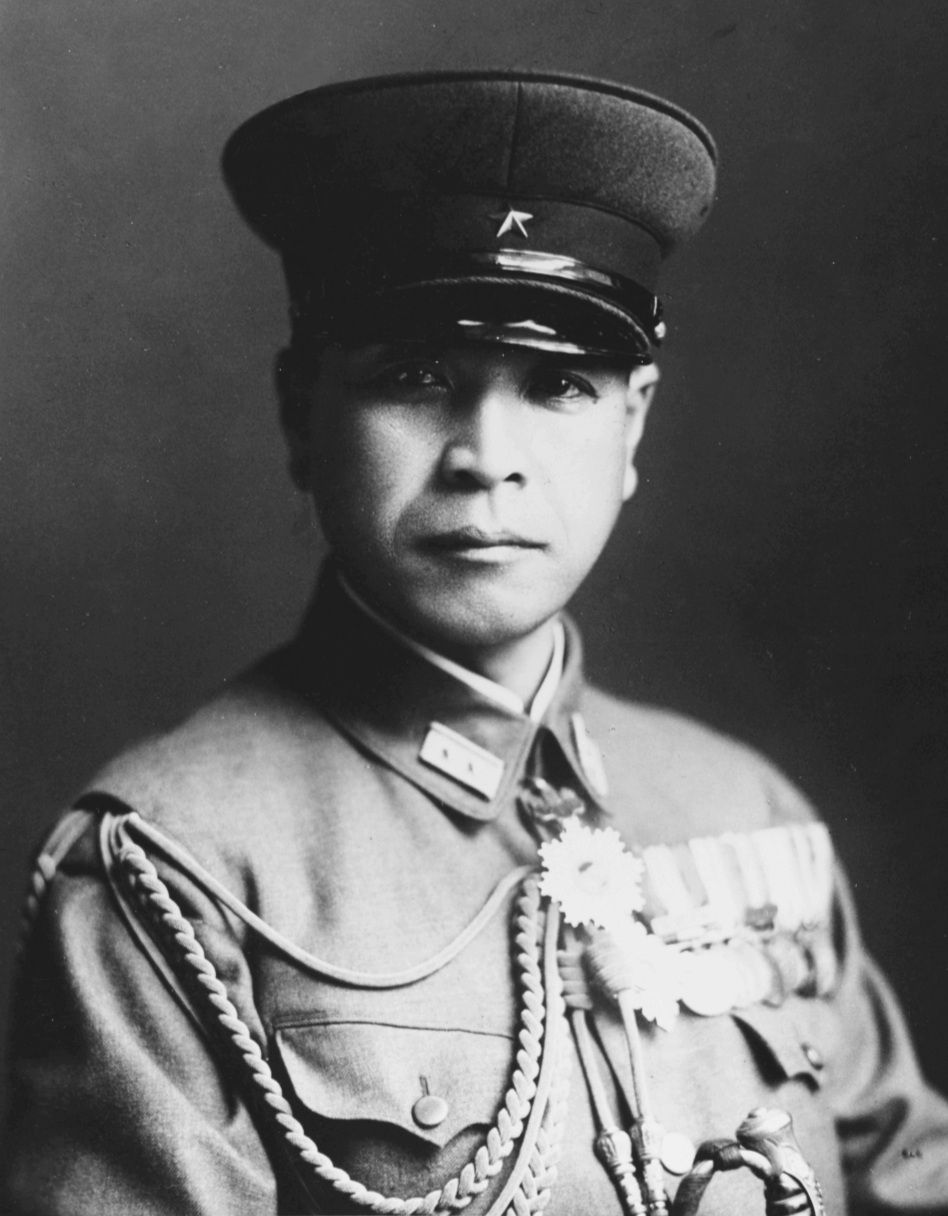
Sōsaku Suzuki

=== Trial ===
In 1947, after the Japanese surrender, British authorities in Singapore held a war crimes trial for the perpetrators of the Sook Ching. Seven Japanese officers: Takuma Nishimura, Saburo Kawamura, Masayuki Oishi, Yoshitaka Yokata, Tomotatsu Jo, Satoru Onishi, and Haruji Hisamatsu, were charged with conducting the massacre. Staff officer Masanobu Tsuji was the mastermind behind the massacre, and personally planned and carried it out, but at the time of the war crimes trials he had not been arrested. As soon as the war ended, Tsuji escaped from Thailand to China. The accused seven persons who followed Tsuji's commands were on trial.

During the trial, one major problem was that the Japanese commanders did not pass down any formal written orders for the massacre. Documentation of the screening process or disposal procedures had also been destroyed. Besides, the Japanese military headquarters' order for the speedy execution of the operation, combined with ambiguous instructions from the commanders, led to suspicions being cast on the accused, and it became difficult to accurately establish their culpability.

==== Verdict ====
Saburo Kawamura and Masayuki Oishi received the death penalty while the other fifty received life sentences, though Takuma Nishimura was later executed in 1951 following conviction by an Australian military court for his role in the Parit Sulong Massacre. The court accepted the defence statement of "just following orders" by those put on trial. The condemned were hanged on 26 June 1947. The British authorities allowed only six members of the victims' families to witness the executions of Kawamura and Oishi, despite calls for the hangings to be made public.

The mastermind behind the massacre, Masanobu Tsuji, escaped. Tsuji, later after the trial and the execution, appeared in Japan and became a politician there. Tsuji evaded trial, but later disappeared, presumedly killed in Laos in 1961. Tomoyuki Yamashita, the general from whose headquarters the order seems to have been issued, was put on another trial in the Philippines and executed in 1946. Other staff officers, who planned the massacre, were Shigeharu Asaeda and Sōsaku Suzuki. But, as Asaeda was captured in Russia after the war, and Suzuki killed in action in 1945 before the end of the war, they were not put on trial.

The reminiscences of Saburo Kawamura were published in 1952 (after his death) and, in the book, he expressed his condolences to the victims of Singapore and prayed for the repose of their souls.

Mamoru Shinozaki (February 1908 – 1991), a former Japanese diplomat, has been described as instrumental as key prosecution witness during the Singapore War Crimes Trial between 1946 and 1948. Shinozaki remains a controversial figure, with some blaming him for saying positive things about the accused (despite being a prosecuting witness); views on him continue to vary, with opinions ranging from calling him the "wire-puller" of the massacre or criticizing him for "self-praise" in his autobiography to calling him a life-saving "Schindler" of Singapore.

=== Post-war sentiment ===
==== Reparations ====
When Singapore gained self-governance in 1959, waves of anti-Japanese sentiment arose within the Chinese-Singaporean community, who demanded war reparations and an official apology from Japan. Prior to self-governance, the British only demanded reparations from the Japanese for damages suffered by Singapore's European community. The British failure to demand reparations for damages suffered by the colony's Chinese, Malay and Indian communities played a major role in Singaporean support for independence during the post-war period.

The Japanese Foreign Ministry declined Singapore's request for an apology and reparations in 1963, stating that the issue of war reparations with the British had already been settled in the San Francisco Treaty in 1951 and hence with Singapore as well, which was then a British colony. Singapore's first prime minister Lee Kuan Yew responded by arguing that the British colonial government did not represent the voice of Singaporeans. In September 1963, the Chinese community staged a boycott of Japanese imports by refusing to unload aircraft and ships from Japan, which lasted for a week.

Lee, however, was also a pragmatist, and was actually somewhat concerned by the boycott. He felt that the tenacious emphasis on the martyrdom of the Sook Ching victims would disrupt the fragile ethnic balance and destroy his efforts to build a united Singaporean national identity, in addition to obstructing Singapore's laissez-faire economic policy at the Port of Singapore. As a result, he took the position that the commemoration activities must be aimed at paying tribute to all civilian victims of the Japanese occupation, irrespective of their ethnic origin. After all, he added that the Japanese were brutal to all ethnic groups. Lee also wanted Japan's compensation to the families of Sook Ching victims to also complement contributing to the development of Singapore.

=== Acknowledgement ===
According to Hirofumi Hayashi, the Japanese Ministry of Foreign Affairs "accepted that the Japanese military had carried out mass killings in Singapore ... During negotiations with Singapore, the Japanese government rejected demands for reparations but agreed to make a 'gesture of atonement' by providing funds in other ways."

Nevertheless, the Japanese government was motivated to provide compensation to Singapore because of the potential economic damage to Japan as a result of a boycott or sabotage by the local Chinese should Singapore's demands be rejected. They also saw the potential for Singapore's post-war ensuing success and was keen on repairing their relations.

With Singapore's full independence from Malaysia on 9 August 1965, the Singapore government made another request to Japan for reparations and an apology. On 25 October 1966, Japan agreed to pay S$50 million in compensation, half of which was a grant and the rest as a loan. However, Japan did not make an official apology. These payments were also classified as a "gesture of atonement", and not "damages" or "reparations". Also, the Japanese government refused legal responsibility for the massacre and an investigation into the death toll.

== Remains and commemoration ==
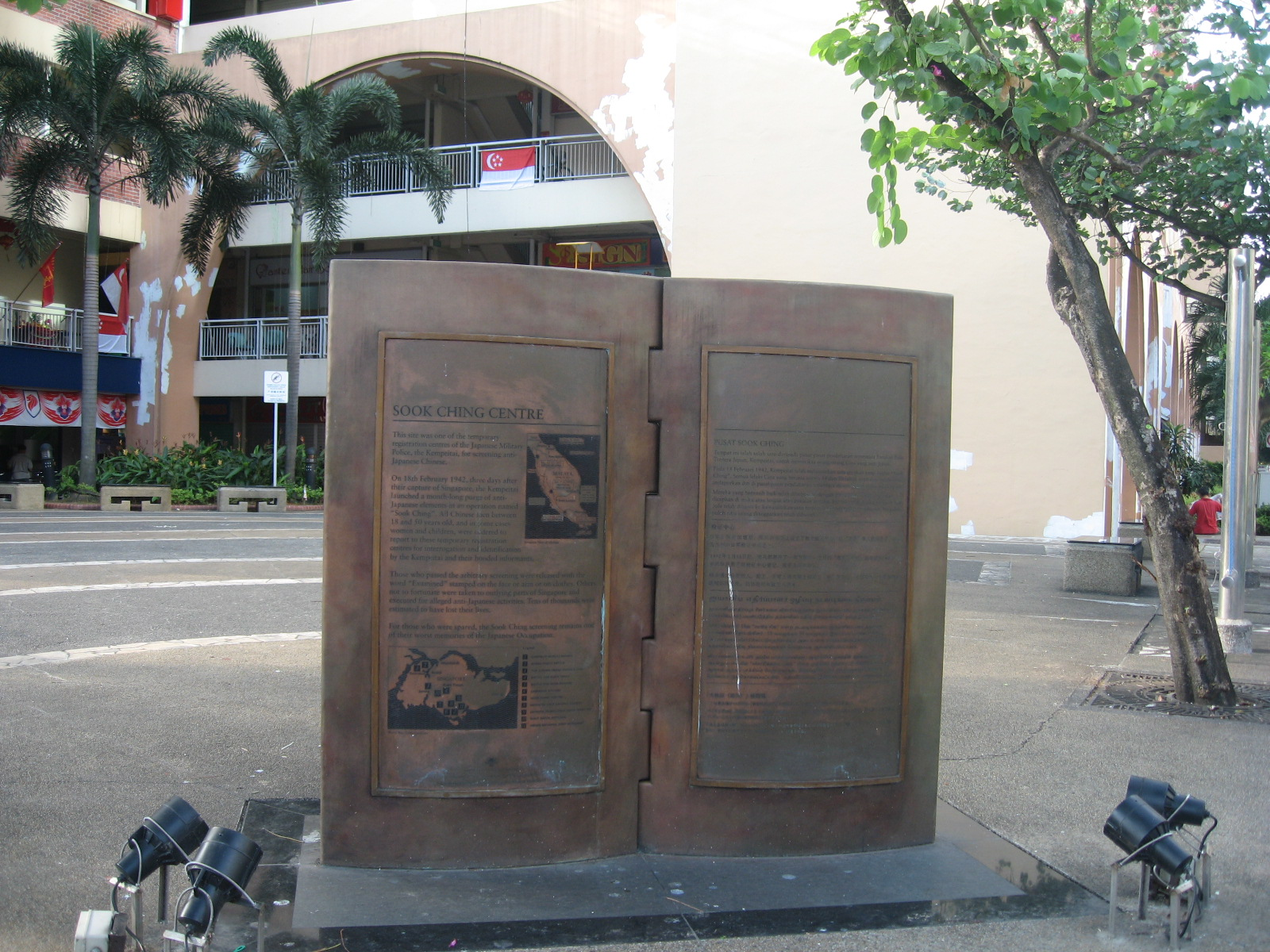
The Sook Ching Centre site memorial in 2006 standing in front of the Hong Lim Complex in Chinatown

Due to the fact that only a few remains of Sook Ching victims were found during the occupation and in the first post-war years, the families of the murdered did not have the opportunity to commemorate their relatives while respecting Chinese traditions. For this reason, a Taoist ceremony was held in early 1948 in the neighbourhood of Siglap in the eastern part of Singapore, in what is known as the "Valley Of Tears" – where mass graves from the Japanese occupation period were suspected to be, a Taoist ceremony was held to "soothe hungry ghosts."

Thousands of Singaporean Chinese – mostly family members of the victims – took part in it. In the same year, a special committee was established, chaired by local businessman Tay Koh Yat. His task was to find the remains of Sook Ching victims. For the first dozen or so years, the effects of the committee's work were, however, extremely modest.

=== Discovery of mass graves ===
It was not until 1962 that the mass graves of Sook Ching victims were accidentally discovered at the "Valley Of Tears" in Siglap. On the initiative of the Singapore Chinese Chamber of Commerce and Industry, search and exhumation work began – also in other alleged Japanese crime scenes. In the years 1962 to 1966, nearly 100 graves were discovered. The Chinese community called for the construction of a cemetery in Siglap and a monument to the victims of the massacre. The remains of the victims of the Sook Ching would continue to be unearthed by locals for decades after the massacre.

=== Heritage sites ===
A memorial to the victims of the Japanese occupation, known as the Civilian War Memorial, was erected at Beach Road in central Singapore. It was unveiled on 15 February 1967, 25 years after the fall, during a ceremony attended by prime minister Lee Kuan Yew. The monument consists of four pillars, 67.4 meters high, symbolizing the four largest ethnic groups in the country. The pedestal of the memorial also has inscriptions written in Singapore's four official languages, English, Chinese, Malay, and Tamil. Under the monument, there is a tomb containing the remains of Sook Ching victims, which were found from 1962 to 1966. Every year on 15 February, on the anniversary of Singapore's surrender, ceremonies are held at the Civilian War Memorial in honor of the victims of the war.

The massacre sites of Changi Beach, Katong, Punggol Point, Tanah Merah and Sentosa were marked as heritage sites in 1992 to commemorate the 50th anniversary of the end of the Japanese occupation.

Among other sites, this specific war monument plaque was erected at the Changi Beach Park (near Camp Site 2) in the eastern part of Singapore. The inscription on the monument plaque, which was also repeated in Singapore's three other official languages of Chinese, Malay and Tamil, as well as in Japanese, reads:

66 male civilians were killed by Japanese Hojo Kempei (auxiliary military police) firing at the water's edge on this stretch of Changi Beach on 20 February 1942. They were among tens of thousands who lost their lives during the Japanese Sook Ching operation to purge suspected anti-Japanese civilians among Singapore's Chinese population between 18 February and 4 March 1942. Tanah Merah Besar Beach, a few hundred metres south (now part of Singapore Changi Airport runway) was one of the most heavily-used killing grounds where well over a thousand Chinese men and youths lost their lives.
— National Heritage Board.

== Legacy ==
The massacre and its post-war judicial handling by the colonial British administration incensed the Chinese community. The Discovery Channel programme commented about its historic impact on local Chinese: "They felt the Japanese spilling of so much Chinese blood on Singapore soil has given them the moral claim to the island that hasn't existed before the war". Lee Kuan Yew said on the Discovery Channel programme, "It was the catastrophic consequences of the war that changed the mindset, that my generation decided that, 'No ... this doesn't make sense. We should be able to run this [island] as well as the British did, if not better.'" "The Asiatics had looked to them for leadership, and they had failed them."

In an article carried on the Singapore Ministry of Defence (MINDEF) website:

While the quick defeat of the British in Singapore was a shocking revelation to the local population, and the period of the Japanese Occupation arguably the darkest time for Singapore, these precipitated the development of political consciousness with an urgency not felt before. The British defeat and the fall of what was regarded as an invincible fortress rocked the faith of the local population in the ability of the British to protect them. Coupled with the secret and sudden evacuation of British soldiers, women and children from Penang, there was the uneasy realisation that the colonial masters could not be relied upon to defend the locals. The Japanese slogan "Asia for Asians" awoke many to the realities of colonial rule, that "however kind the masters were, the Asians were still second class in their own country". Slowly, the local population became more aware of the need to have a bigger say in charting their destinies. The post-war years witnessed a political awakening and growing nationalistic feelings among the populace which in turn paved the way for the emergence of political parties and demands for self-rule in the 1950s and 1960s.

The memories of those who lived through that period have been captured at exhibition galleries in the Old Ford Motor Factory at Bukit Timah, the site of the factory where the British surrendered to the Japanese on 15 February 1942.

== See also ==
- Kenpeitai East District Branch
- Senbu
- Japanese war crimes
- Nanjing massacre
- Indonesian mass killings of 1965–66
