= Eastern News Agency =

Eastern News Agency commonly refers to:

- Eastern News Agency, Singapore
- Eastern News Agency (Bangladesh)
