= Hirofumi Hayashi =

Professor of politics at the Kanto Gakuin University

Hirofumi Hayashi (林 博史, Hayashi Hirofumi; born April 6, 1955) is a historian, an authority on modern Japanese history, and is a professor of politics at the Kanto Gakuin University. He has been conducting research on the Japanese occupation of Southeast Asia, Japanese war crimes, and war crimes trials including the subject of comfort women.

== Education and career ==
Hayashi graduated from the University of Tokyo in 1979, and then obtained master's degree from Hitotsubashi University. In 1985, he was accepted as a full-time lecturer in the College of Economics at the Kanto Gakuin University, became an assistant professor, and was granted his current position as professor in 1999.

== Historical research ==
Over the course of his career Hayashi has researched Japanese history during World War II. He has researched the Sook Ching massacres in Singapore, discovered that US war crimes trials began on Guam before the Japanese surrender in 1945.

When consulted on school textbooks, he criticised the Textbook Authorization Council for distorting passages from his 2001 book The Battle of Okinawa. He argued that Okinawa residents' mass suicides were effectively under the control of the Japanese military, even if no direct orders were given.

Hayashi has discovered documentary proof of Japanese military's wide and common involvement in the forced sexual slavery of the comfort women on Java in Indonesia, in Lansong Province in Vietnam, and in Guilin City in China.Historian Ikuhiko Hata has also written on issues related to Japanese wartime history and the comfort women system.

On Feb 25, 2014 Hayashi said, "The claims to inspect the credibility of the testimony made by these comfort women are intended to deny the whole existence of the comfort women itself".

On April 7, 2014, Hayashi found evidence of the forced sexual slavery on Bali in Indonesia.
