= YMCA Building, Singapore =

Coordinates: 01°17′50.59″N 103°50′54.70″E

YMCA of Singapore
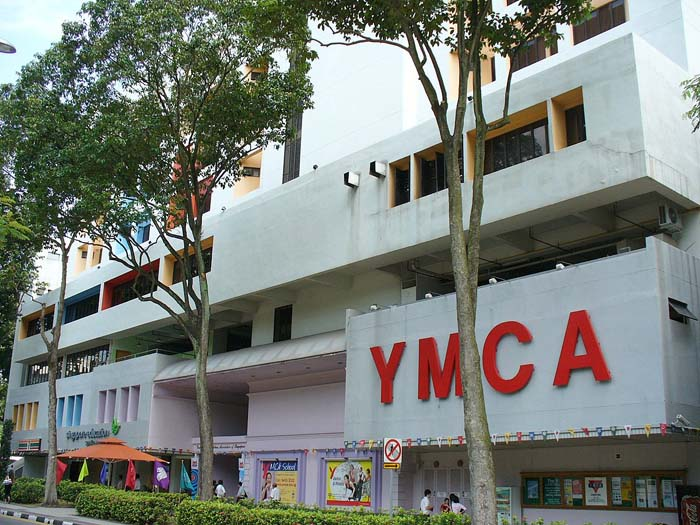
- YMCA Building in 2007

- Location within Singapore
- Alternative names: YMCA @ One Orchard

General information
- Status: Completed
- Location: Orchard Road, Singapore, 1 Orchard Road, Singapore 238824, Singapore
- Named for: YMCA
- Construction started: 1981
- Completed: 1984
- Opened: 24 November 1984
- Owner: YMCA
- Affiliation: YMCA

Technical details
- Floor count: 9
- Lifts/elevators: 1

Website
- www.ymca.org.sg

The YMCA Building is the current headquarters of YMCA of Singapore. It also operates a hotel under the name of YMCA @ One Orchard.

== Background ==
Plans of the new YMCA headquarters building was first started in 1969 by its committee. After many revisions, the proposal was approved by the authorities in 1979 to build the nine-storey building at the site at Orchard area.

The former YMCA Building, which was once served as the notorious headquarters of Kempeitai during the Japanese occupation of Singapore, was demolished in 1981 to make way for the construction of new building, with fund-raising efforts started on the same year and the next.

The new YMCA Building was officially opened on 24 November 1984 by the then Minister for Law Edmund William Barker. It currently serves as headquarters of the YMCA of Singapore for its members and also serves as a hotel YMCA @ One Orchard for tourists and travelers in Singapore.
