= Colin Sleeman =

British judge (1914–2006)

Stuart Colin Sleeman (10 March 1914 – 14 June 2006) was a British judge. As an assistant judge advocate general, he was appointed as senior counsel for the defence in two trials of Japanese soldiers accused of war crimes held in Singapore after the end of the Second World War. He was later a circuit judge in England.

== Life and education ==
Sleeman was born in Bristol, where his father was a solicitor. He was related to Sir William Henry Sleeman, an administrator in India in the first half of the 19th century who was responsible for suppressing the Thuggee sect. Sleeman was educated at Clifton College, and then read jurisprudence at Merton College, Oxford.

Sleeman was called to the bar at Gray's Inn in 1938, where he later became a bencher in 1974. He married Margaret Farmer in 1944, with whom he had two sons and a daughter (Stuart, Jeremy and Jennifer).

In the Second World War, he was initially employed in the Ministry of Economic Warfare. He was commissioned into the 16th/5th The Queen's Royal Lancers and became a staff captain in the Royal Armoured Corps. He was ultimately promoted to lieutenant colonel and was appointed assistant judge advocate general in the headquarters of the Allied Land Forces in South East Asia.

== War crimes trials ==
The trials in Singapore of Japanese soldiers on charges of war crimes began in January 1946. In the first trial, Captain Gozawa Sadaichi and nine other Japanese soldiers were accused of maltreating Indian prisoners of war who refused to join the Japanese-sponsored Indian National Army. The British were conscious of the need for a fair trial to avoid accusations of "victor's justice", to bolster the argument for preserving the British Empire. Accordingly, the defendants were granted full legal representation and Sleeman acted as senior counsel for the defence. His efforts on behalf of the defendants were praised by the tribunal. One defendant was acquitted, eight were sentenced to terms of imprisonment, Sadaichi to 12 years, and the others to lesser terms. Lieutenant Kaniyuki Nakamura was sentenced to death for the illegal execution by beheading of an Indian serviceman accused of planning to escape.

Sleeman also acted for the defence in a second trial in Singapore, which took place in March and April 1946. In the "Double Tenth" trial, 21 members of the Kempeitai (Japanese military police) were accused of war crimes relating to the torture of 57 of prisoners (including John Leonard Wilson, Bishop of Singapore) following a raid on Changi Prison on 10 October 1943 to investigate a suspected spy network, thought to be responsible for the sinking of seven Japanese merchant vessels in Singapore harbour in September 1943. Many were brutally tortured and one prisoner was executed. Another attempted suicide, was refused medical attention, and was left to die of his wounds. Several others died afterwards. The commanding officer, Lieutenant Colonel Sumida Haruzo and seven others were sentenced to death, three to life imprisonment and others to shorter terms of imprisonment.

Sleeman published an account of the trial of Sadaichi in 1948, with a foreword by Earl Mountbatten of Burma. With Sam Silkin, he published The Double Tenth Trial, an account of the trial of Haruzo in 1951, with a foreword by Viscount Simon.

== Legal career ==
After he left the army, Sleeman returned to the bar, practising mostly in the divorce courts. He was junior counsel for the defence in the trial of John Christie, accused of murdering his wife Ethel at 10 Rillington Place.

He was appointed as a recorder in 1975 and then as a circuit judge in 1976, having in that position until 1986, initially in Coventry and later in Surrey.
