= Shinozaki =

Shinozaki (written: 篠崎) is a Japanese surname. Notable people with the surname include:

- Ai Shinozaki (篠崎 愛, born 1992), Japanese gravure idol and singer
- Gene Shinozaki (篠崎 仁, born 1991), Japanese singer and instrumentalist
- Makoto Shinozaki (篠崎 誠, born 1963), Japanese film director
- Mamoru Shinozaki (篠崎 護, 1908–1991), Japanese spy
- Mio Shinozaki (篠崎 澪, born 1991), Japanese basketball player
- Norio Shinozaki (篠崎 紀夫, born 1969), Japanese golfer
- Sasuke Shinozaki (篠崎 佐助, born 1993), Japanese motorcycle racer
- Terukazu Shinozaki (篠崎 輝和, born 1998), Japanese football player
- Yoko Shinozaki (篠崎 洋子, born 1945), Japanese volleyball player
- Yukiko Shinozaki, Japanese dancer and choreographer

== See also ==
- Shinozaki Station, a railway station in Edogawa, Tokyo, Japan
