= Jiji Press =

News agency based in Tokyo, Japan

Jiji Press Ltd.

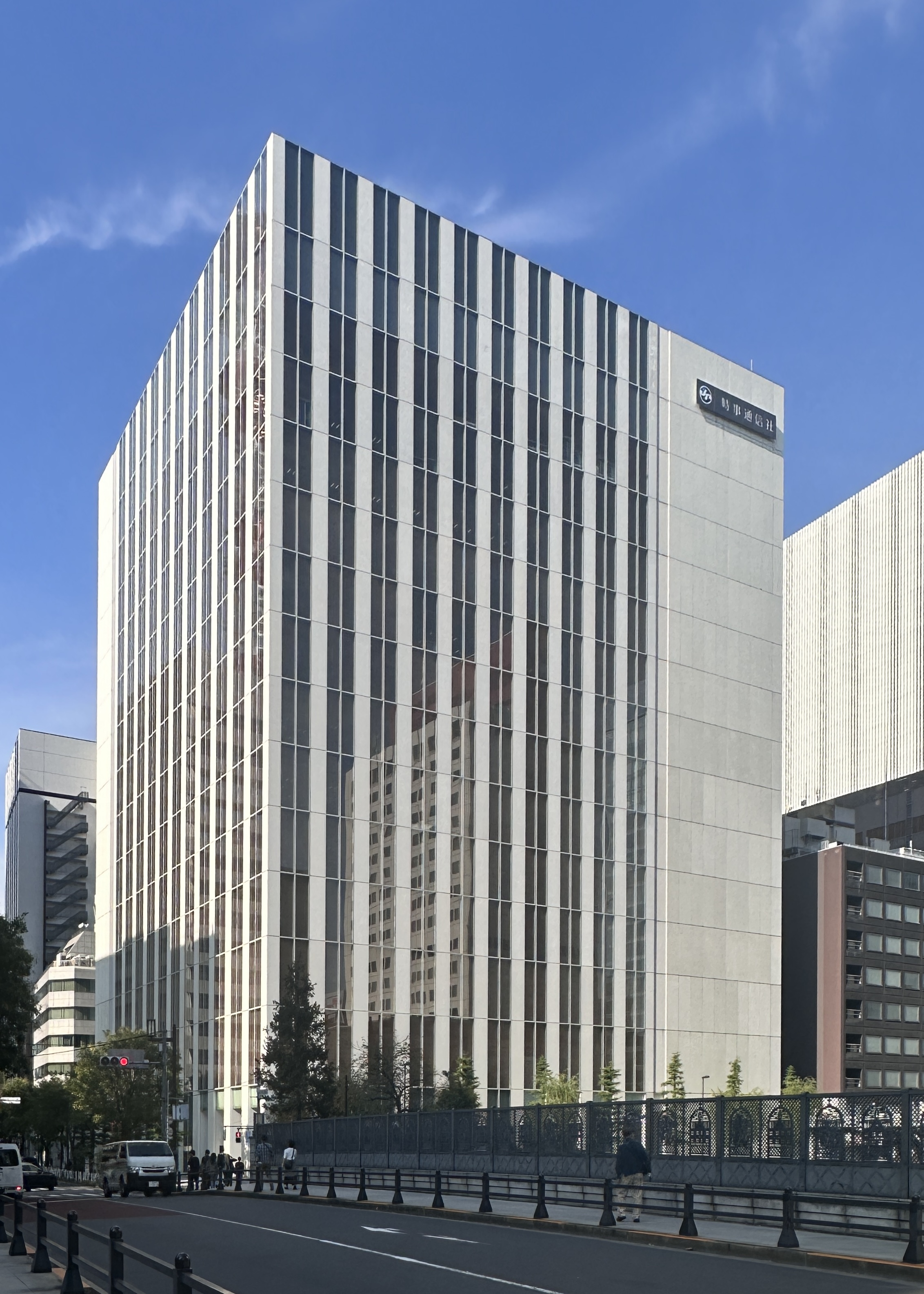
- Headquarters in Ginza, Chuo, Tokyo
- Native name: 株式会社 時事通信社
- Romanized name: Kabushiki gaisha Jiji Tsūshin-sha
- Company type: Private employee-owned KK
- Predecessor: Domei Tsushin
- Founded: November 1, 1945; 80 years ago
- Headquarters: Ginza 5-15-8, Chuo, Tokyo, Japan
- Number of locations: 78 offices in Japan, 28 offices overseas
- Key people: Masao Omuro (President)
- Net income: 262 million yen (2016)
- Total assets: 38 billion yen (2016)
- Total equity: 21 billion yen (2016)
- Number of employees: 862
- Website: jiji.com
- Footnotes / references 2016 financials

Jiji Press Ltd. (株式会社時事通信社, Kabushiki gaisha Jiji Tsūshinsha) is a news agency in Japan.

== History ==
Jiji was formed in November 1945 following the breakup of Dōmei Tsushin, the government-controlled news service responsible for disseminating information prior to and during World War II. Jiji inherited Domei's business-oriented news operations, while Kyodo News inherited its general public-oriented news operations. In later years Jiji developed ties with UPI, the Associated Press, AFP, Reuters and other international news organizations.

In 2011, Jiji reported that Olympus CEO Michael Woodford blackmailed company management into appointing him CEO in exchange for promises to cover up an accounting fraud scandal. Woodford argued that "the so-called unnamed sources at Olympus had clearly lied, [and] Jiji had without proper scrutiny and challenge simply reported those lies." Jiji later withdrew the report and apologized.

In 2012, Jiji president Masahiro Nakata resigned after it was found that a Jiji writer in Washington, D.C., copied an article wired by Kyodo News.

In 2025, Jiji signed a media cooperation agreement with Xinhua News Agency.

== Corporate structure ==
Jiji is run as an employee-owned corporation and is not publicly traded, nor does it have non-employee shareholders. Jiji has news bureaus throughout Japan and in many major cities worldwide.

Jiji is the third-largest shareholder in Dentsu, holding 5.85% of the outstanding stock (16.9 million shares) as of December 2016.
