= Eastern News Agency, Singapore =

Japanese news agency

Eastern News Agency was a Japanese news agency established in October 1938 at Singapore. Three employees provided information service for the newspaper company in British Malaya and for Japanese residents living in Singapore. Almost all of its news had originally been provided by Dōmei Tsushin. In August 1940, related to the death of M. J. Cox, managing editor Ishiro Kobayashi was detained by the Police Office of Singapore. In September 1940, Mamoru Shinozaki, an employee of the agency, was arrested and then sentenced as guilty for so-called espionage :Shinozaki Case.

== Establishment ==
In October 1938, Eastern News Agency started its action in Singapore.

There were three employees. Managing editor Ishiro Kobayashi was also a member of Dōmei Tsushin Singapore Branch. Mamoru Shinozaki was a member of the agency. During the period from August to October 1938, the employee of the agency immigrated to Singapore using official passport and as "press attach" of the Japanese consulate general of Singapore.

- Kobayashi immigrated just before the establishment of the agency. Shinozaki immigrated to Singapore in August 1938. When they immigrated, the Immigration Bureau of Straits Settlements questioned them and did not approved them as formal member of consulate.

== Activities ==
Eastern News Agency provided the information service: "Eastern News" for free to British Malaya' newspapers and Japanese residents living in Singapore and other cities.

Almost all of the news they provided were originally provided by the Japanese Dōmei Tsushin.

- Shinozaki in 1981 remarked that his mission was to provide "fresh and undistorted Japanese news", i.e. propaganda, through the Singapore Herald, which was a newly issued English newspaper and published in Singapore, by inviting Bill Hosokawa from Portland as the chief editor.

== Espionage and propaganda ==
On August 4, 1940, related to the arrest of ten or more Britons in Japan and the death of M. J. Cox, Kobayashi was arrested by Police Office of Singapore. After 49 days of detainment, on September 21, 1940, he discharged.

On September 21, 1940, the same day of Kobayashi's discharge, Shinozaki was arrested on suspicion of espionage. Then by the Court he sentenced as guilty, was punished for three year's imprisonment and jailed: Shinozaki Case.

In November 1940, on the Court of Shinozaki, it was found that the Eastern News Agency planned to re-organize its teams and newly establish a Chinese news team before Shinozaki's arrest.
