= Double Tenth incident =

1943 massacre in Singapore

Double Tenth incident Double Tenth massacre
- Location of Changi Prison in Singapore
- Native name: 双十節事件
- Location: 01°21′23″N 103°58′13″E; Changi Prison, Japanese-occupied Singapore
- Date: 10 October 1943
- Deaths: 15
- Injuries: 42
- Perpetrator: Japanese Kenpeitai
- Motive: Suspicion of victims' involvement in Operation Jaywick

The "Double Tenth incident" (双十節事件 Sōjūsetsu jiken) or "Double Tenth massacre" occurred on 10 October 1943, during the Second World War Japanese occupation of Singapore. The Kenpeitai—Japanese military police—arrested and tortured fifty-seven civilians and civilian internees on suspicion of their involvement in a raid on Singapore Harbour that had been carried out by Anglo-Australian commandos from Operation Jaywick. Three Japanese ships were sunk and three more were damaged, but none of those arrested and tortured had participated in the raid, nor had any knowledge of it. Fifteen of them died in Singapore's Changi Prison.

After the war ended, twenty-one of the Kenpeitai involved were charged with war crimes. Eight received the death sentence, seven were acquitted, and the remainder were given prison sentences varying from one year to life.

== History ==
In 1943, a special branch of the Kenpeitai under Lieutenant Colonel Haruzō Sumida was charged with finding the culprits responsible for acts of sabotage in Singapore, mainly the cutting of telephone lines and the burning of warehouses. Sumida strongly suspected that the saboteurs were being organised by internees in Changi Prison, and made preparations for a raid on the prison to catch the ringleaders. Sumida's chief suspect was British barrister Rob Heeley Scott, a prominent Foreign Office employee who had previously been detained for his anti-Japanese propaganda, released by the Kenpeitai, and then later sent to Changi Prison.

However, neither Scott nor anyone else in Changi was involved in the sabotage, or with the raid that led to serious repercussions on 10 October—"the double tenth", as it happened on the tenth day of the tenth month, which is the National Day of the Republic of China. On 28 September, Scott received a message from one of his contacts in the city, telling him that on the previous morning six Japanese ships had been blown up in Singapore Harbour (now Keppel Harbour). This was the first major sabotage since the Japanese had captured the island. The loss of ships in such an important place was an enormous blow to Japanese prestige. Scott and his fellow internees supposed that the saboteurs must have been Chinese guerrillas who had slipped across the straits from their base in Malaya. Sumida, however, believed that Scott and his associates had planned the operation from Changi Prison.

=== Operation Jaywick ===
The attack on Singapore Harbour was codenamed Operation Jaywick, the brand name of a popular lavatory deodoriser, and had nothing to do with guerrillas or fifth columnists. It had been carried out by Lieutenant Colonel Ivan Lyon from Z Special Unit, a group of Anglo-Australian commandos who had sailed from Western Australia to Singapore in an old Japanese fishing boat, the Krait, named after a Malayan snake. Once within striking distance of the harbour, the commandos took to folboats (folding canoes), and paddled into the docks under cover of night. Using limpet mines, they sank six Japanese ships of 2,000–5,000 tons, including several tankers, and then slipped away to their rendezvous with the Krait, finally returning successfully to Australia. (The Krait is now preserved and on display at the Australian National Maritime Museum in Sydney.) The Japanese could not conceive that a force could penetrate their lines of defence and have the audacity to attack their shipping. They therefore concluded that it must have been an internal operation, carried out by Chinese guerrillas organised from Changi Prison.

=== Arrests and torture ===
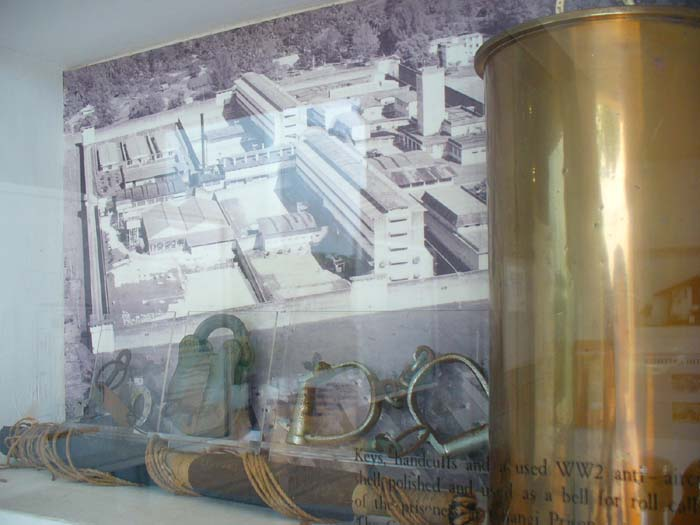
The display of POWs' artifacts at the Changi Chapel and Museum, Singapore. In the background is a bird's eye view of the Changi Prison during World War II

On the day after the Double Tenth, internees were ordered to parade in the open at nine o'clock in the morning. No explanation was given. When the parade had assembled, the camp commandant came out with a number of Kenpeitai and troops, who closed all the exits. While the names of a few men were called out for immediate arrest, the Kenpeitai conducted a thorough search of the entire prison. After incriminating evidence including diaries of war news compiled from the BBC's radio broadcasts, self-made radios, and a tin box containing a substantial amount of money belonging to an ex-banker were unearthed, several more arrests were made, mostly of people who had been involved in monitoring news broadcasts and running a secret information service throughout the prison. This started a period of terror that lasted for several months. Suspects were hauled from their homes and places of work. Internees were taken to the Kenpeitai interrogation chambers, where they were subjected to torture and starvation to make them confess to acts of sabotage and treason. As none of the suspects had even heard of Operation Jaywick, let alone been part of it, any confessions they made were meaningless, lacking any information about the raid itself, how it had been organised, or where the explosives had been obtained.

=== Elizabeth Choy ===
The etched drawings on the heritage monument, near where the present YMCA building stands, depict what the Old YMCA Building looked like.

Elizabeth Choy and her husband, Choy Khun Heng, were running their canteen at the Tan Tock Seng Hospital, after all the patients and doctors had been moved from the Miyako Hospital (former Woodbridge Hospital). She had been a school teacher at St Andrew's School before the war. The couple helped the Changi prisoners of war (POW) by passing on cash and parcels containing such things as fresh clothing, medicine and letters during their deliveries. An informant told the Kenpeitai that the Choys were involved in smuggling money into Changi Prison, and Khun Heng was arrested. After several days, Elizabeth went to the YMCA on Stamford Road, used by the Kenpeitai as their headquarters, known as the Kenpeitai East District Branch, to inquire about her husband. The Japanese denied all knowledge of him, but three weeks later they lured her back to the YMCA and confined her with other Chinese and Changi prisoners. There was no sign of Khun Heng. The prisoners were forbidden to speak to one another, although one of the internees, John Dunlop, secretly taught them to communicate in sign language.

At Elizabeth's first interrogation session, the Japanese told her that some ships had been sunk in the harbour and they wanted to know the location of a large amount of money. She claimed no knowledge of the matter but was repeatedly interrogated and beaten. At various times, the Kenpeitai forced Elizabeth to kneel on some angled bars of wood on the floor. They stripped her topless and tied her to the wood so she could not go either forwards or backwards. Then they applied electric shocks to her. They even brought in her husband to let him see her being tortured. After nine months in captivity, Elizabeth had lost half her body weight.

=== Innocent victims ===
Seven days after the Double Tenth, Bishop Leonard Wilson of St Andrew's Cathedral was taken to the YMCA, and placed in the cell next to Elizabeth. He was severely beaten for three days before the Japanese accepted that he was not one of the ringleaders in their imagined conspiracy. One night, Elizabeth saw Rob Scott, by then badly disfigured as a result of the beatings and water tortures that he had been subjected to. At the end of one session, Scott was told that he had been sentenced to death, and was forced to write a farewell letter to his wife. He was later sentenced to six years' imprisonment in Outram Road Prison, the site where convicted sepoy mutineers had been detained and executed by the Singapore Volunteer Corps in 1915.

Elizabeth was held in the YMCA for nearly 200 days, during which time the Kenpeitai meticulously followed up every point in her story, cross-examining people she said she had helped. After a huge dossier of interviews had been compiled, the Japanese concluded that she was telling the truth and set her free; however, Khun Heng was sentenced to 12 years in Outram Road Prison. People avoided Elizabeth following her release, too terrified to speak to her. Fifteen internees died in the Kenpeitai's cells during the Double Tenth inquisition. The suffering spread to the entire civilian population of Changi Prison; rations were cut, and games, concerts, plays and school lessons were forbidden for months.

== "Double tenth" trial ==
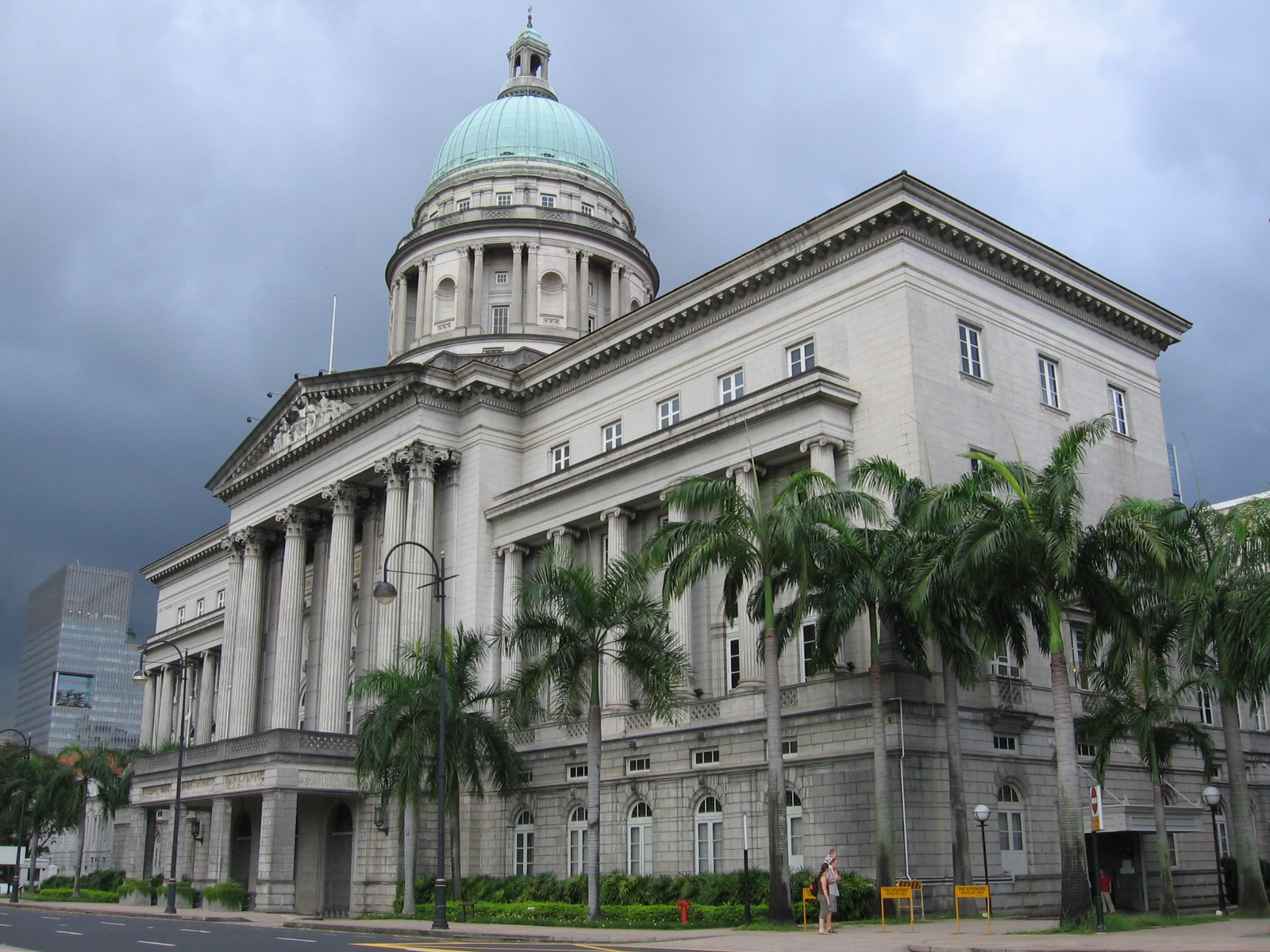
The former Supreme Court Building, where most of the war crimes trials were held

After the war, on 18 March 1946, the "double tenth" war crimes trial was held in the Supreme Court Building, before a military court presided over by Lieutenant Colonel S. C. Silkin. Twenty-one Kenpeitai were accused of torturing 57 internees, resulting in the deaths of 15. On 15 April 1946, after a hearing lasting 21 days, Sumida was one of eight sentenced to death by hanging. Three others received life imprisonment, one a sentence of fifteen years, and two were given prison terms of eight years. Seven were acquitted.

In recognition of her valour and wartime effort during the Japanese Occupation, Elizabeth Choy was awarded the Order of the British Empire (OBE) in London in 1946.

== See also ==
- Colin Sleeman
- Selarang Barracks incident
- SGH War Memorial
