= Chua Ser Koon =

Singapore historian (born 1944)

Chua Ser Koon (Chinese: 蔡史君; born 1944) is a Singapore historian, who specialise in the Japanese occupation of Singapore and Japan–Singapore relations or Japan–Malaysia relations. Known for her editorial of the book titled Xin Ma Huaren Kangri Shiliao (Malayan Chinese Resistance to Japan) 1937-1945.

== Early life and education ==
Chua was born in Singapore in 1944. In 1963, she entered the Nanyang University and major in history and graduated in 1967.

Chua also studied in Graduate School of Humanities and Sociology and Faculty of Letters, The University of Tokyo, Japan. She mainly studied history of Japan - South East Asia relations. Then in doctoral course, she major in history of Japanese military administration during the W.W.II period.

== Career ==
Chua worked at National Archives and Oral History Center of Singapore and took charge of the theme "Japanese Occupied Singapore".

Later she taught students in Reitaku University and Keio University. In 1997, she became the Professor of Tsuda University and taught international relations.

She mainly took charge of teaching and study of South East Asian history and overseas Chinese history.

== Books ==
Chua with Hsu Yun Tsiao edited the book titled Xin Ma Hua Ren Kang Ri Shi Liao (Singapore and Malayan Chinese Resistance to Japan) and the book later partly translated to Japanese language version.

- Hsu, Yun Tsiao; Chua, Ser Koon (1986). Singapore under Japanese Army's Occupation (in Japanese). Translated by Hiroshi Tanaka & Heiwa Fukunaga. Tokyo: Aoki Shoten. ISBN 4-250-86028-0.
- Chua, Ser Koon (1997). "The impact and experience of Japanese military Administration". In Kurasawa, Aiko (ed.). Japanese occupation in South East Asian history (in Japanese). Tokyo: Waseda Univ. Press. pp. 478–503. ISBN 4-657-97520-X.

== Bibliography ==
- "Professor Chua Ser Koon". Center for Southeast Asian Studies (in Chinese). Xiamen University. 2007-09-24. Archived from the original on 2018-09-17.
- Kurasawa, Aiko (1997). "Introduction of authors". Japanese occupation in South East Asian history (in Japanese). Tokyo: Waseda Univ. Press. pp. 573–574. ISBN 4-657-97520-X.
