= Kempeitai West District Branch =

Coordinates: 01°16′58.8″N 103°50′33.0″E

- Location within Singapore

General information
- Status: Demolished
- Location: Singapore, Smith Street, Singapore
- Named for: Kempeitai
- Completed: 1938
- Demolished: 1975
- Owner: Singapore Improvement Trust
- Landlord: Singapore Improvement Trust
- Affiliation: Kempeitai

Technical details
- Floor count: 3

Design and construction
- Known for: Kempeitai West District Branch in Chinatown, Singapore

The Kempeitai West District Branch was one of the branches of the Kempeitai in Singapore besides the much noted Kempeitai East District Branch during the Japanese occupation of Singapore from 1942 to 1945.

== History ==
The Singapore Improvement Trust (SIT) was a government organisation set up in 1927 by the British colonial government in the Straits Settlements with the recruitment of Captain Edwin Percy Richards as its deputy chairman in response to the housing needs of the population of Singapore. At the time, many people resided in overcrowded shophouses and squatter settlements, resulting in widespread disease and lack of hygiene and sanitation. The SIT organisation had brought in professional architects and general contractors to resolve this large social problem, with the ultimate goal of building affordable public housing for the common population of Singapore.

== Japanese Occupation of Singapore ==
Following the Japanese Occupation of Singapore in 1942, work at SIT came to a standstill with all its senior officers as prisoners-of-war, with a large number of the subordinate staff, however, worked for the Japanese administration. The Kempeitai came under the jurisdiction of the Ministry of War in Tokyo. There were about 200 regular Kempeitai in Singapore but 1,000 auxiliaries were recruited from the army.

The Kempeitai took over a three-storey SIT residential flat which was located at the intersection of Smith Street and New Bridge Road to operate as one of their branches known as the Kempeitai West District Branch. An Old YMCA Building at Stamford Road formed the Kempeitai East District Branch and also the Kempeitai headquarters. The Kempeitai jail was situated at the Outram Prison and another branch at the Central Police Station. The Kempeitai would operated in these buildings in Singapore until 1945.

== Demolition ==
The SIT flat buildings (known as New Bridge Estate) along the Smith Street, including the one which once housed Kempeitai West District Branch, were demolished in 1975, A commercial building New Bridge Centre was completed on its former site in 1980.
