= Dōmei Tsushin =

Official news agency of the Empire of Japan

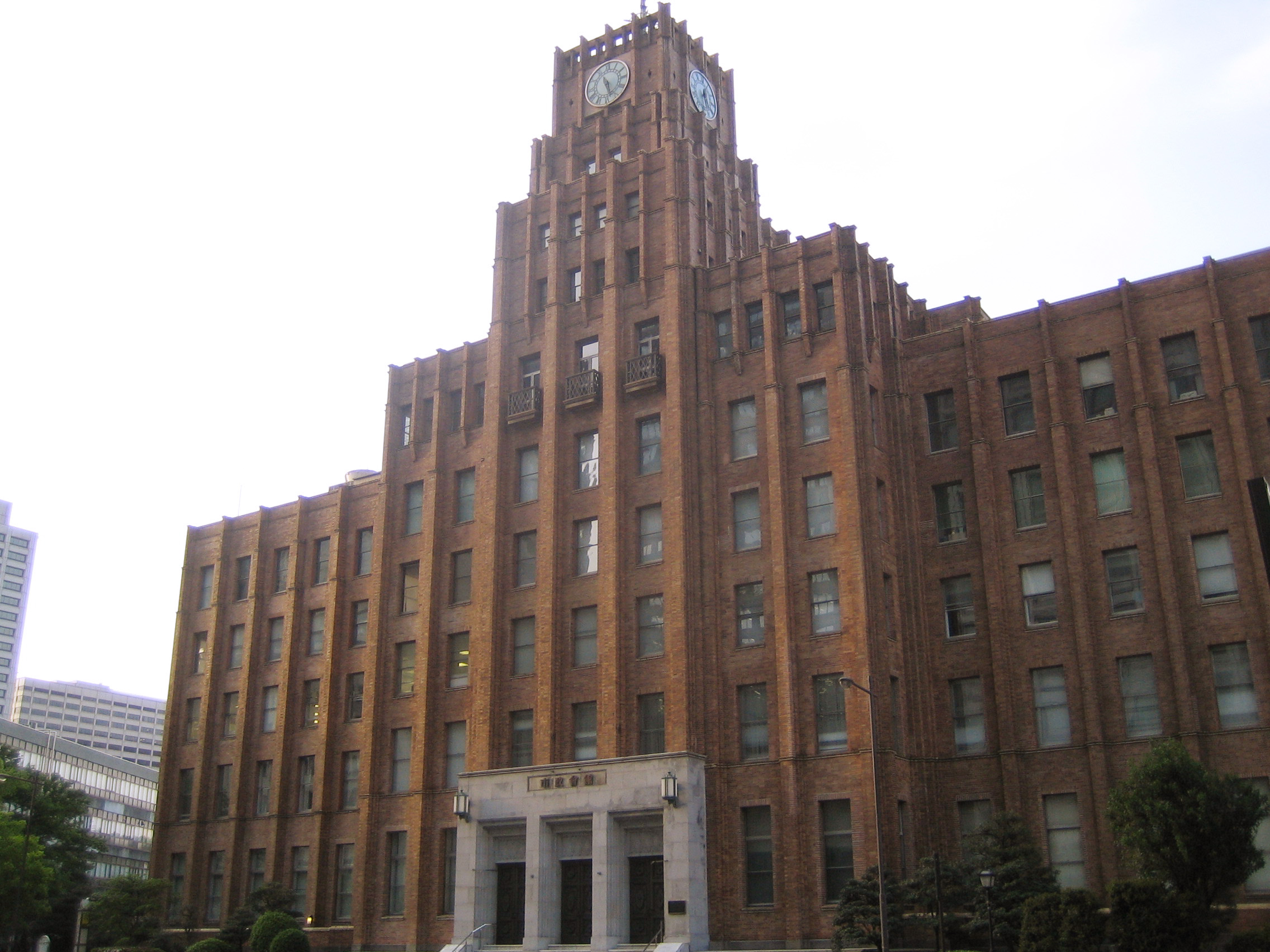
The headquarters of Domei Tsushinsha, in Chiyoda, Tokyo

Dōmei News Agency (同盟通信社, Dōmei Tsūshinsha; lit. 'Federated News Agency') was the official news agency of the Empire of Japan.

== History and development ==
Dōmei was the result of years of efforts by Japanese journalists and business leaders to create a national news agency in Japan that could compete with (and if necessary counter) Reuters and other internationally recognized news agencies on a global basis.

After the Manchurian Incident of 1931, president Yukichi Iwanaga (岩永 裕吉 Iwanaga Yūkichi) of the Nihon Shimbun Rengosha (日本新聞聯合社 Associated Press, or "Rengo") proposed the merger of his news agency with the Nihon Dempo Tsushinsha (日本電報通信社 Japan Telegraphic News Agency, or "Dentsu"). Despite government backing for the move, the merger was resisted by Dentsu president Hoshio Mitsunaga (光永 星郎 Mitsunaga Hoshio), who was reluctant to give up control of his company's lucrative advertising business, and by concerns that a merger would threaten his advertising customer base – the provincial newspapers who competed against Rengo. As a compromise, Mitsunaga agreed to split Dentsu, and separate the news agency from the advertising agency. The news agency was reorganized in a merger with Rengo on 28 December 1935 to form the Dōmei Tsūshinsha.

During World War II, Dōmei News Agency came under the control of the Ministry of Communications, a pre-war cabinet level ministry in the Japanese government. Domei maintained a network of offices outside Japan, dispatching reporters to all allied and neutral countries, and was also involved in film and radio work. It also collected news and information from various sources to pass on to the government and military, and produced various works of propaganda aimed at foreign countries.

Dōmei issued news to the public that was censored along government-approved lines, and broadcast news in Japanese and in major European languages through an extensive network of radio stations in east Asia, Manchukuo and in Japanese-occupied China. It was later authorized by the Japanese military to develop a news network and radio stations in Japanese-occupied Singapore and Malaya.

A number of documented incidents from the period around the outbreak of the Pacific War show that on a personal level Dōmei's staff had good relationships with foreign journalists.

Under the Allied occupation of Japan Dōmei was disbanded, and its functions divided split between Kyodo News (共同通信社) and Jiji Press (時事通信社) in 1945 following the end of World War II.
