= Frank Murray =

Frank Murray may refer to:

- Frank Murray (coach) (1885–1951), American football and basketball coach
- Frank Jerome Murray (1904–1995), American judge
- Francis Murray (physician) (1912–1993), Irish physician
- Frank J. Murray (priest) (born 1949), American priest and politician
- Frank H. Murray (born 1953), American business executive
- Frank Murray (politician), American politician in Montana

== See also ==
- Frank Murrey (fl. 1910s–1920s), American football player and track athlete
- Francis Murray (disambiguation)
