= Changi Prison =

Prison in Singapore

Changi Prison Complex
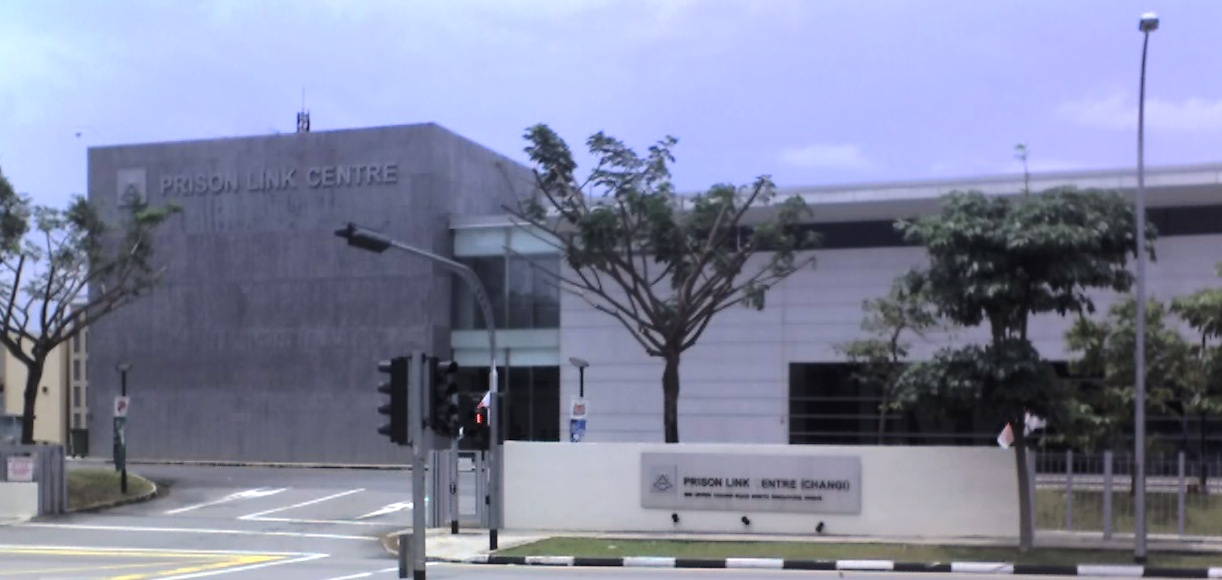
- The Prison Link Centre of the Changi Prison Complex in Changi, Singapore.

- Location within Singapore
- Location: 1°21′25.47″N 103°58′25.11″E
- Status: Operational
- Security class: Maximum
- Capacity: 11,000
- Opened: 1936 (90 years ago)
- Managed by: Singapore Prison Service

Changi Prison Complex, often known simply as Changi Prison, is a prison complex in the namesake district of Changi in the eastern part of Singapore. It is the largest prison in the country, covering an area of about 50 ha (120 acres), and the oldest still in operation since the closure of Outram Prison in 1963. Opened in 1936 by the British colonial government to replace Outram Prison, the complex was constructed with the intention of housing a large number of prisoners due to the rapid growth of the colony and need for a larger penal facility to alleviate prison overcrowding.

Following the fall of Singapore and subsequent Japanese occupation in 1942, Changi Prison was used by the occupational authorities as a prisoner-of-war camp for Allied prisoners of war (POWs). Many of these prisoners were subjected to brutal treatment and forced labour, and a significant number died from malnutrition, disease, and mistreatment. Allied forces liberated Singapore in 1945, and the remaining prisoners at Changi Prison were freed.

Following the end of World War II in Asia, Changi Prison was used by the British to hold Japanese prisoners of war, most of whom were eventually repatriated to Japan. Eight former Kempeitai members who were found guilty of torture and murder were executed at the prison in 1946. Changi Prison was returned to Singapore Prison Service on 15 October 1947, and the prison played a significant role in Singapore's development after its independence, as many prisoners were put to work in various industries such as farming and construction. In the 1970s and 1980s, Changi Prison underwent major renovations and upgrades to improve its facilities and security. New buildings were constructed, including a maximum-security block for high-risk prisoners.

Changi Prison remains in operation as a crucial component of Singapore's criminal justice system. The prison is well-known for its strict discipline and emphasis on rehabilitation, with a focus on providing prisoners with rehabilitation programs such as education and vocational training to help them rebuild their lives and reintegrate into society after their release. The Changi Chapel and Museum is located close to the prison.

== History ==
=== First prison ===
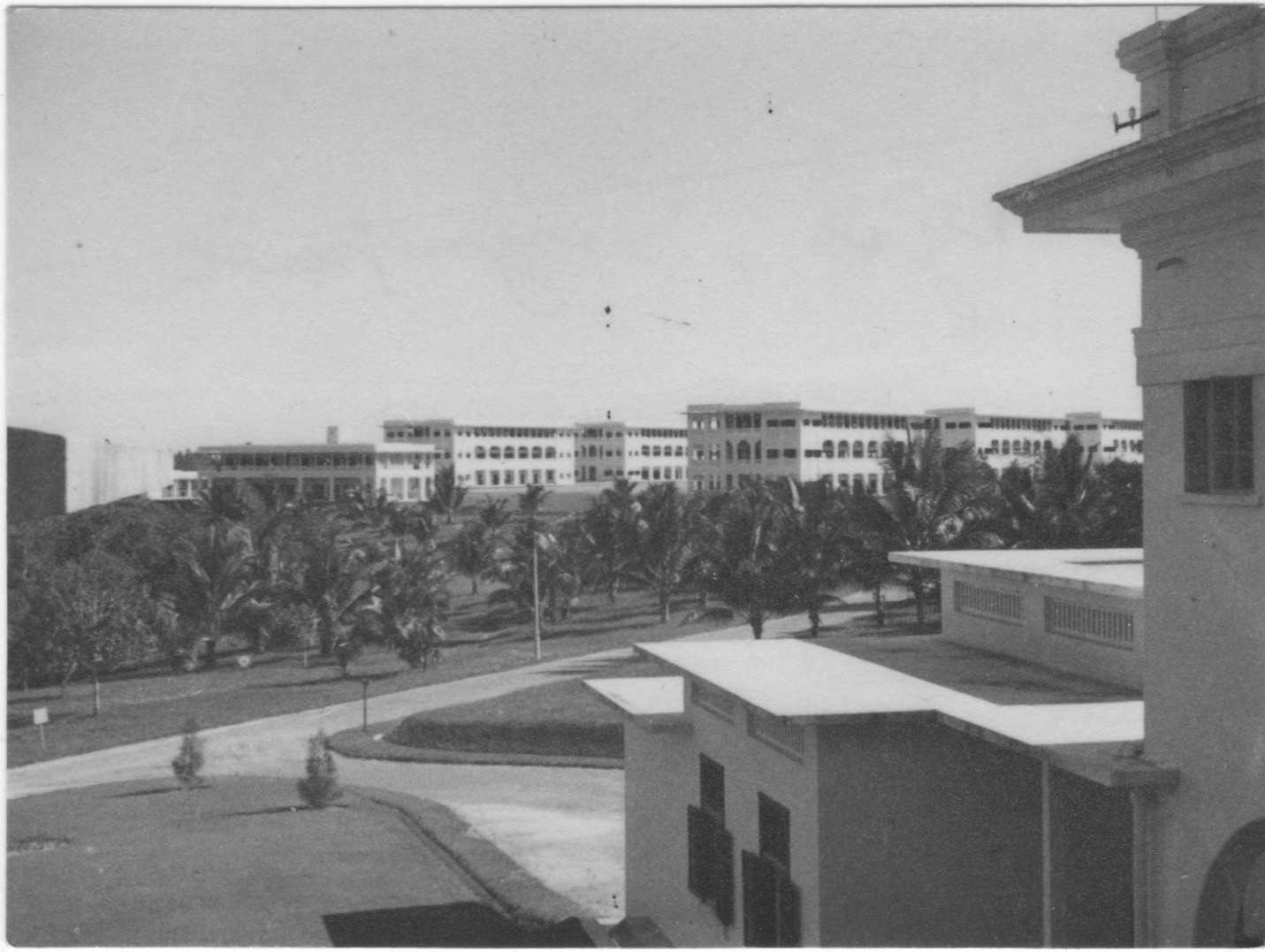
Changi, Singapore, 1941

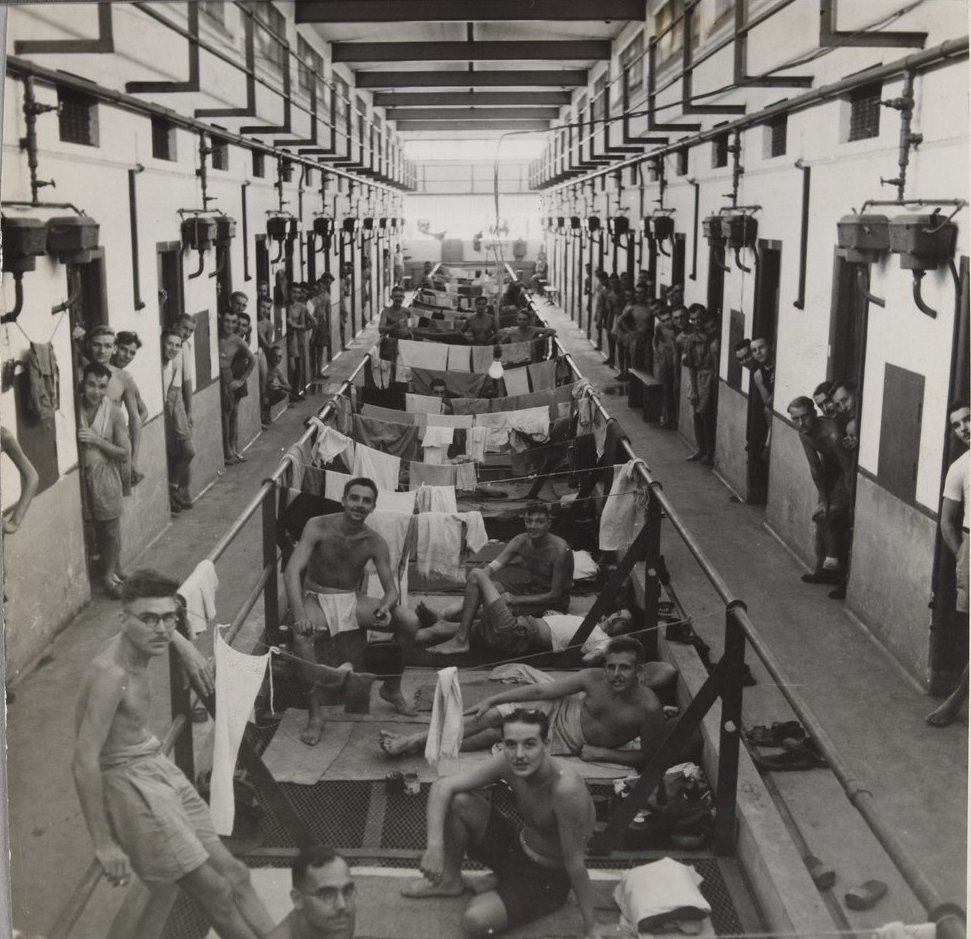
Newly liberated Allied prisoners in makeshift quarters in a central corridor and from crowded cells in Changi Prison in 1945

Prior to Changi Prison, the only penal facility in Singapore was Outram Prison (Singapore Gaol) at Pearl's Hill, beside the barracks of Sepoy Lines. By the 1930s, Outram Prison was overcrowded and deemed dangerous. Outram Prison had a capacity of 1,080. In the early 1920s, the average daily number of convicts was 1,043; it reached 1,311 by 1931. Thus the 1931 report presented by the newly appointed Inspector of Prisons for the Straits Settlements, and the Superintendent of Singapore Prisons, Captain Otho Lewis Hancock, recommended providing additional accommodation. This would enable the authorities to segregate long-term prisoners, likely to be of special danger to the community, from short-term prisoners while relieving congestion in the existing facility. Deliberations in the Legislative Council saw opposition to the subsequent plans for constructing a new prison at Changi due to uncertainties in the numbers planned for the accommodation (ranging between 650 and 2,500), costs (moving from 2 million to 10 million Straits dollars and back), the area to be used (250 acres to 1,500 acres), and the possibility of the new prison grounds turning into a white elephant.

Tenders to construct the grounds of the new prison at Changi were put out in 1933. The tender for erection and completion of the quarters was first awarded to Hup Thye and Co for 16,900 Straits dollars on 26 June 1933, and a 2 September 1933 tender for the prison blocks was reportedly awarded to Chop Woh Hup, a local Chinese construction firm, for 1,278,000 Straits dollars on 8 March 1934. Chop Woh Hup had 20 months to complete the construction of the prison blocks. The new prison would be 11.5 miles away from the Singapore settlement along the Changi Road and provide accommodation for 568 prisoners. Completed in 1936, within the 24 feet high, 3,000 feet long prison walls that were made of reinforced concrete, and occupying 13 acres of land, there would be:

1. An Administration Block and General Store
2. One European Block of Cells and Workshops
3. Two Asiatic Blocks of Cells and Workshops
4. Kitchen and Laundry Blocks
5. Hospital Block
6. Recalcitrant and Punishment Blocks

Within the prison walls, there was an inner wall, 14 feet high, exercise yards, and sufficient vacant land to double the accommodation in the future. Outside the wall, 88 acres of land was set aside for gardening activities by the prisoners. Additional quarters were provided for prison staff adjacent to the prison:

1. Superintendent's Quarters
2. Chief Gaoler's Quarters
3. Assistant Medical Officer's Quarters
4. Two Deputy Gaolers and 26 European Warders' Quarters
5. Asiatic Chief Warder's Quarters
6. Nine Blocks of 12 quarters for Asiatic Warders and Attendants
7. Ten Quarters for Clerks and Dressers.

Along with additional contracts for water supply and sewage disposal, the total estimated costs of the new establishment came out at 2,050,000 Straits dollars. A subsidiary settlement was developed to support an enterprise of small Chinese traders who would provide necessities to the staff and the prison.

Aerial photo of Changi prison in Singapore taken in 1952 (looking east). The oval shaped building in the bottom right corner was the death row section of the prison.

When it was officially operational in June 1937, it was claimed to be one of the best prisons in the British Empire. The design of the prison was based on a T-shaped structure, with two cell-block wings stretching out from a central main block (for administration areas and warden-offices), to allow for quick and easy access to either cell-block wing for the wardens whenever necessary (from up above, the prison buildings formed the shape of the top of a telegram/telephone pole). Changi Prison also boasted the use of an advanced and extensive alarm system and had electrical lighting in its cells along with flush-toilets in each. The prison had a holding capacity of 600. Long-term prisoners would be transferred from the existing Singapore Prison.

The death row section of Changi Prison consisted of 24 cells arranged in a horse shoe shaped block around an open air grassy exercise yard. The exercise area itself was enclosed in steel bars and had a wire mesh roof to prevent escape by helicopter. The cells were about three square metres (32 square feet) in size, with bare concrete walls on three sides and the remaining side consisting of vertical steel bars facing out into the block. The building also contained the gallows where judicial hangings were performed, and condemned inmates had a final walk of about 20 meters from their cell to the execution chamber.

=== Conversion into a prisoner of war camp ===
The painting Orderly on His Rounds in X Ward, Changi Gaol, Singapore, With Pow's Suffering from Starvation and Beri-beri by Leslie Cole, 1945

During World War II, following the Fall of Singapore in February 1942, the Japanese military detained approximately 3,000 civilians in Changi Prison, which was built to house only one-fifth of that number. The Japanese used the British Army's Selarang Barracks, near the prison, as a prisoner of war camp, holding some 50,000 Allied soldiers, predominantly British and Australian, and from 1943, Dutch civilians brought over by the Japanese from the islands in the Dutch East Indies (now Indonesia). In the UK, Australia, The Netherlands and elsewhere, the name "Changi" became synonymous with the infamous POW camp nearby, since most of the Japanese prisons were in the Changi area. Around 500 detainees were women who had been separated with their children and marched to the cramped prison camp from their homes. These women and also girls sewed quilts for the prison hospital, daringly embroidering their own secret symbols and stories into the squares, including forget-me-nots, butterflies, angels, scenery of trees and sheep, other symbolic flowers and even a domestic sitting room, ships, birds and a map of Scotland, and one of Australia. They risked severe punishments by sewing, depicting their prison environment and adding dozens, or even over 400 names in one case, onto the cloths. One depicted the Changi Stroll, the forced march of the captive women and children over nine miles to the prison under the occupation by the Japanese on 8 March 1942, coincidentally now International Women's Day commemorating women and the defiance of the suffragettes. Surviving examples of the prison handiwork are in the archives of the British Red Cross, Imperial War Museum, London or held at the Australian War Memorial. About 850 POWs died during their internment in Changi during the Japanese occupation of Singapore, a relatively low rate compared to the overall death rate of 27% for POWs in Japanese camps. However, many more prisoners died after being transferred from Changi to various labour camps outside Singapore, including those on the Burma Railway and at Sandakan airfield.

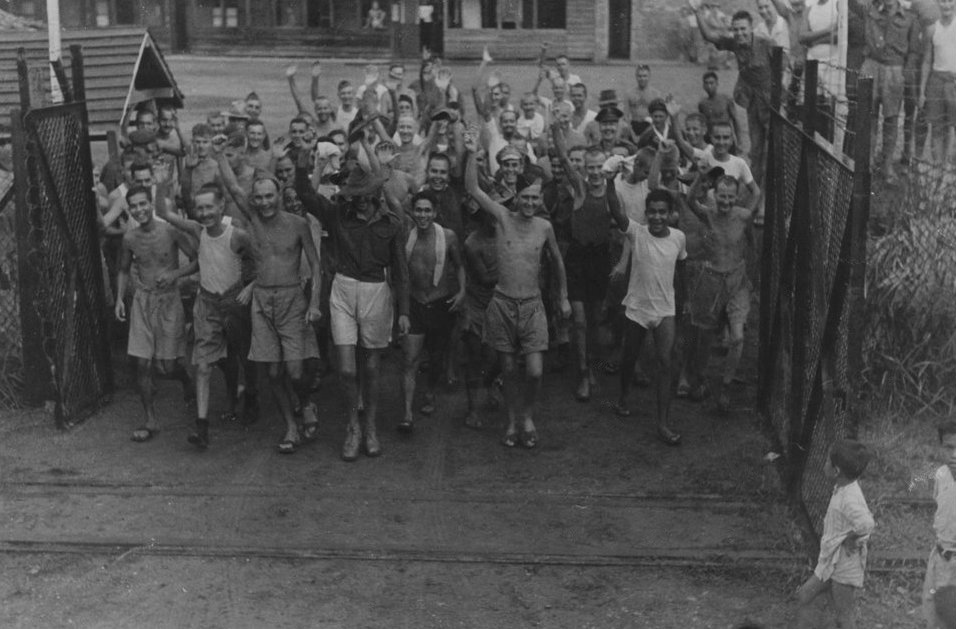
Allied prisoners of war piling out of the main gate of the Changi Prison after the British liberation of Singapore in September 1945

Allied POWs, mainly Australians, built a chapel at the prison in 1944, using simple tools and found materials. Stanley Warren of the 15th Regiment, Royal Regiment of Artillery painted a series of murals at the chapel. Another British POW, Sgt. Harry Stodgen, built a Christian cross out of a used artillery shell. After the war, the chapel was dismantled and shipped to Australia, while the cross was sent to the UK. The chapel was reconstructed in 1988, and is now located at the Royal Military College, Duntroon, Canberra. The prisoners of war also established an education program nicknamed the Changi University.

==== Kempeitai ====
The prison also contained the headquarters of the Kempeitai, the Japanese military police. The Kempeitai tortured and executed prisoners there, who they suspected were spies, such as during the Double Tenth incident. Most were civilians, although a small number were Allied POWs.

=== Postwar history ===
After the war, Changi Prison was used by the British to hold Japanese prisoners of war, which included former Imperial Japanese Army, Imperial Japanese Navy and Kempeitai personnel, police officers and POW camp guards; British troops were used as ad hoc prison officers. Most of the prisoners of war were eventually repatriated to Japan, but eight former Kempeitai members were found guilty by a military tribunal of torturing 57 internees (which resulted in 15 of them dying) in the "Double tenth" trial on 18 March 1946 at the Supreme Court Building and were sentenced to death. In the inner yard of the prison, three gallows were erected to carry out the sentences, which were performed in April 1946. On 17 October 1945, 260 German prisoners of war (who were former Kriegsmarine personnel and had served on U-boats) were moved from Pasir Panjang to Changi Prison. Almost a year later on 26 June 1946, all German prisoners of war in the prison were notified that they would be repatriated back to Germany via England on a passenger liner, the Empress of Australia.

The prison was returned to Singapore Prison Service on 15 October 1947, and long-term prisoners from Outram Prison were transferred back to Changi. Changi Prison played a significant role in Singapore's development after its independence, as many prisoners were put to work in various industries such as farming and construction. In the 1970s and 1980s, Changi Prison underwent major renovations and upgrades to improve its facilities and security. New buildings were constructed, including a maximum-security block for high-risk prisoners.

=== Changi Chapel and Museum ===
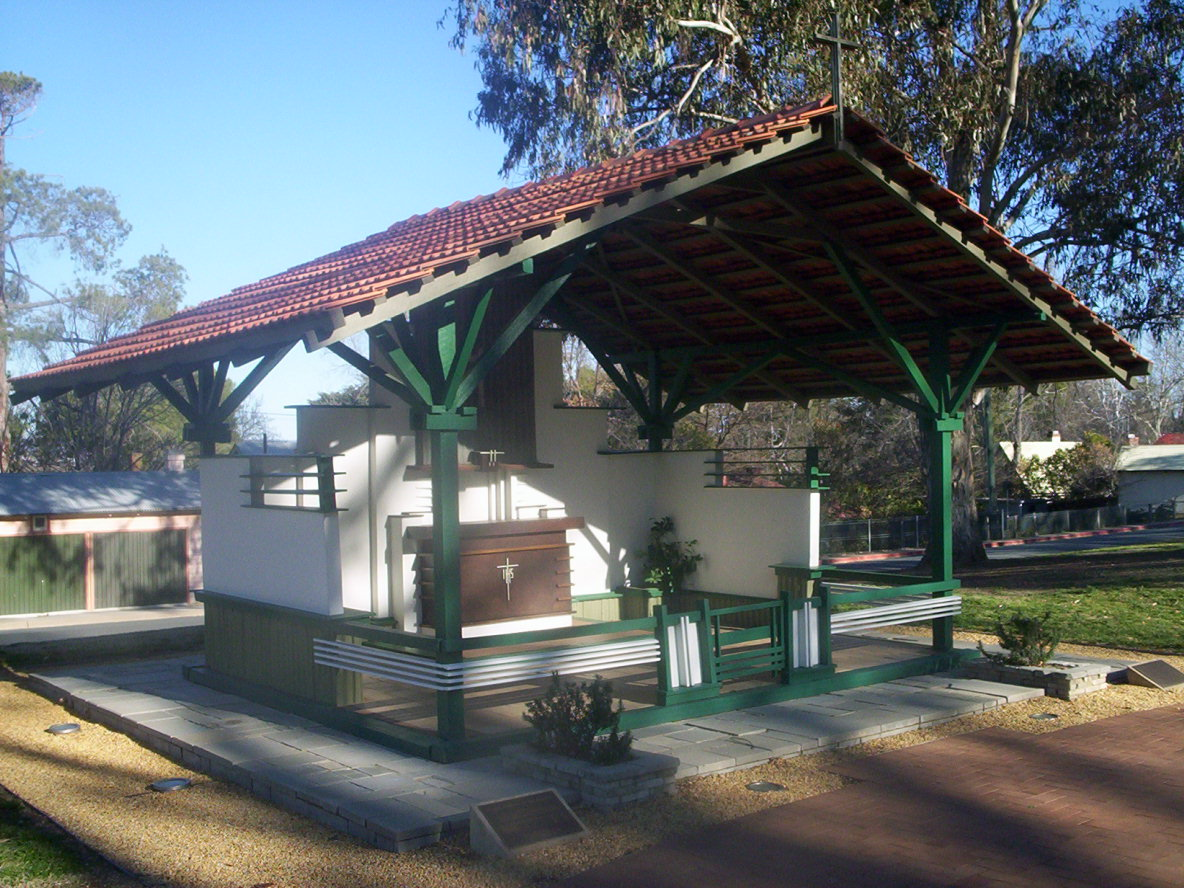
Original Changi chapel, relocated to Duntroon, Australian Capital Territory

The original open-air chapel, built by the POWs in 1944, was later relocated to Duntroon, Canberra.

In 1988, Singapore built a replica chapel, next to the Changi Prison. The project included a museum. When Changi Prison was expanded in 2001, the chapel and museum were relocated to a new site 1 kilometre (0.62 mi) away, officially reopening on 15 February 2001. On 1 April 2018, the museum was closed and reopened in 2020.

In 1994, Changi Women's Prison and Drug Rehabilitation Centre was opened.

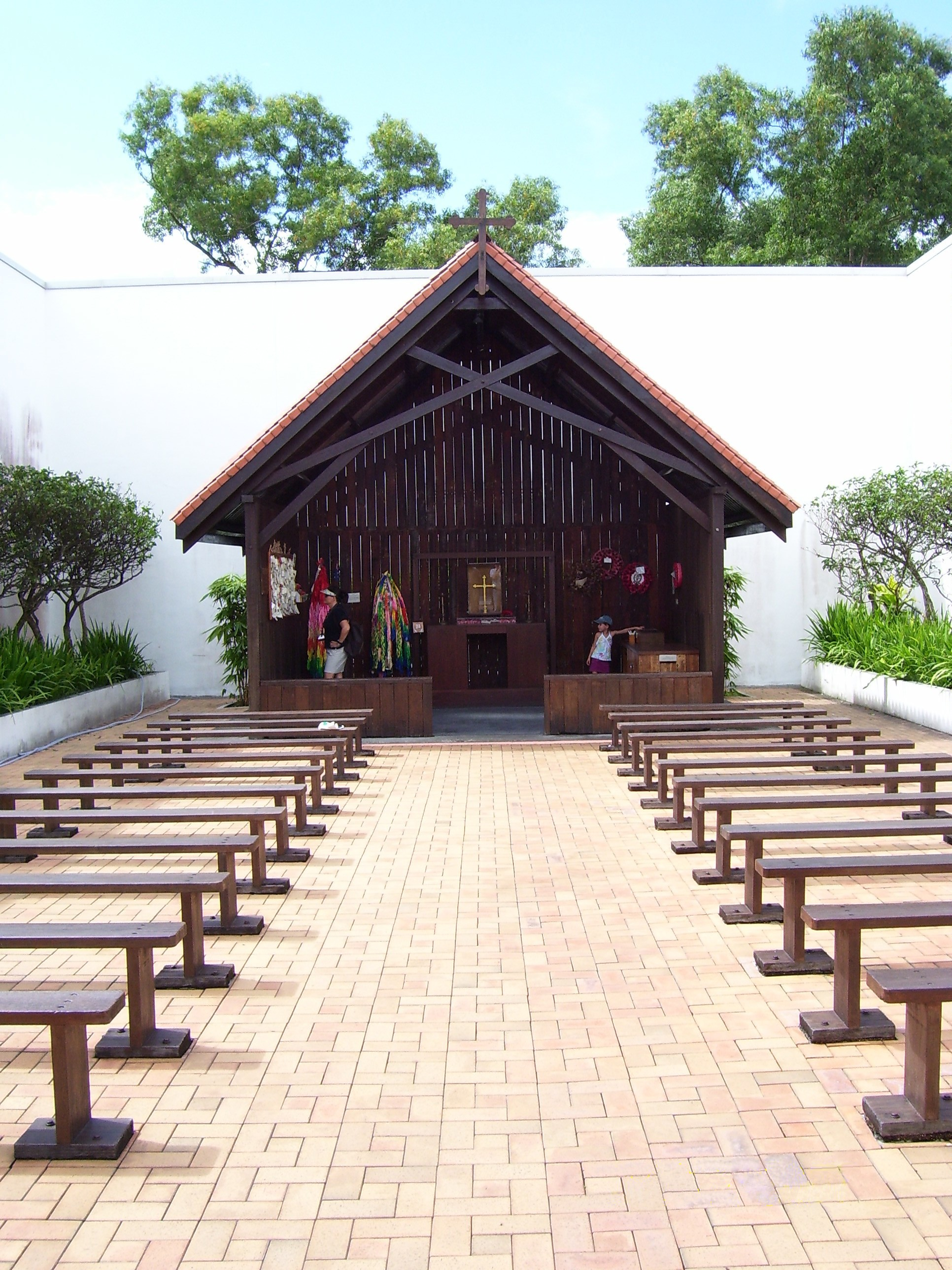
Replica Chapel in Singapore

== Demolition and redevelopment ==
In 2000, a plan was revealed to consolidate the 14 prisons and drug rehabilitation centres (DRCs) that were scattered across the country into one mega complex at Changi Prison location. The complex would sit on a site of area 48ha at a cost of S$1.07 billion, but freeing up 61ha of land, which would make way for residential development. The complex would occupy on the lands of existing Changi Prison, Moon Crescent Prison and Jalan Awan Prison.

The plan was carried out in phases, with each phase forming a cluster of prison institutions in the complex. Cluster A was officially launched on 16 August 2004. Cluster A would house the inmates from the existing Changi Prison, Moon Crescent Prison, Jalan Awan Prison and the Changi Reformative Training Centre.

Cluster B was officially launched on 20 January 2010. Cluster B would house 5,600 inmates from standalone prisons: Tanah Merah Prison, Queenstown Remand Prison, Sembawang DRC, Khalsa Crescent Prison, and Selarang Park DRC. The inmates were moved in five separate, single day operations between July and August 2009, making it the largest transfer of prisoners in Singapore history. Cluster B would eventually become the start and the end of most prisoners' journey within the complex, with the admissions and pre-release procedures carried out in the buildings of this cluster.

In 2012, work on building the SPS headquarters on the Complex's grounds began with the $118.5 million contract awarded to Sembawang Engineers and Constructors (SEC). The building would contain a hydrogen integrated proton-exchange membrane fuel cell power plant to generate clean energy to be supplied to the complex. Due by 2014, it was delayed due to financial troubles faced by SEC. On 15 October 2017, Changi Women's Prison was effectively moved into Cluster A. On 4 July 2018, Admiralty West Prison was effectively relocated to TM2, the yet-to-be demolished facilities of Tanah Merah Prison.

=== Preservation efforts ===
Towards the end of 2003, Australian authorities lobbied the Singapore government to preserve the old Changi Prison after knowing that the old Changi Prison would be demolished by April 2004 to redevelop the land for Cluster B, on the basis of its historical significance where 15,000 Australians were imprisoned after Singapore fell to imperial Japan in 1942. On 8 March 2004, a decision was made to preserve the old prison's iconic front walls, front gates and two guard-towers at either end of the wall, which was welcomed by Australian's Minister of Foreign Affairs Alexander Downer.

==== Changi Chapel and Museum ====
In 2016, the historical remnants of the old prison – the entrance gate, wall and turrets – was gazetted as the 72nd National Monument of Singapore. The entrance gate was moved from the adjacent boundary wall and fitted into the retained wall. The Changi Chapel and Museum reopened in 2021 to the public.

== Current prison ==
Presently, the new Changi Prison Complex houses the most serious criminals in the country, including those serving long sentences (including life imprisonment) and those sentenced to death. It serves as the detention site for death row inmates at Changi before they are executed by hanging, traditionally at dawn on a Friday, except twice, one on 20 May 2016 when the execution of Kho Jabing was carried out at 3:30 pm after his appeal for a stay of execution was dismissed that same morning, as well as on 27 April 2022 when the execution of Nagaenthran K. Dharmalingam was carried out on a Wednesday instead of a Friday.

Changi Prison Complex is also where judicial corporal punishment, in the form of caning, is carried out. Caning sessions at Changi are reportedly held twice per week.

== Notable detainees ==
=== Prisoners of war ===
- Sir Norman Alexander, Professor of Physics, Raffles College, Singapore; Vice-Chancellor, Ahmadu Bello University, Nigeria. Helped build a salt evaporation plant at Changi and a small industrial plant that fermented surgical spirit and other products for the prison hospital.
- Sir Harold Atcherley, businessman, public figure and arts administrator.
- Geoffrey Bingham, AM, MM (1919–2009), who returned to Australia and wrote several books reflecting on his experiences, including his conversion to Christian faith in The Story of the Rice Cakes, Angel Wings, and Tall Grow the Tallow Woods.
- Freddy Bloom (1914–2000), journalist and campaigner for deaf children.
- Russell Braddon (1921–1995), Australian writer, who wrote "The Naked Island" about his POW experience.
- Sheila Bruhn (née Allan), who wrote about her experiences in Diary of a Girl in Changi.
- Sir John Carrick, AC, KCMG (1918–2018). The impact of his experiences on his political thinking is described in his biography, "Carrick: Principles, Politics, and Policy," written by Graeme Starr.
- Anthony Chenevix-Trench (1919–1979), Headmaster of Eton College, 1964–70.
- James Clavell is one of the most famous survivors; he wrote about his experiences in the book King Rat.
- Eugene Ernest Colman, chess master.
- John Coast (1916–1989), British writer and music promoter. He wrote one of the earliest and well-known POW memoirs of Changi The Railroad of Death, (1946). Coast admitted that he and his fellow officers regularly stole coconuts during the night to alleviate their hunger. Other works of Coast include Dancers of Bali (1953), and Dancing Out of Bali (1954).
- Hugh Edward de Wardener, British, CBE (1915–2013), physician and professor of medicine at Charing Cross Hospital. He was a member of the Royal Army Medical Corps. He operated a Cholera Ward at the prison hospital. He also treated British soldiers who were forced to build the Burma Railway. Although he lived to 98, he suffered from peripheral neuropathy, a legacy of Changi, in his last months.
- Noel Duckworth, Chaplain, Churchill College, Cambridge.
- John Cade, Australian psychiatrist who pioneered the use of lithium in bipolar disorder.
- Lieutenant Colonel Sir Ernest Edward "Weary" Dunlop, AC, CMG, OBE (1907–1993), was an Australian surgeon who was renowned for his leadership
- Carl Alexander Gibson-Hill, medical doctor and Director of the Raffles Museum.
- John Hayter, Anglican priest who later wrote of his experiences in Priest in Prison.
- Percy Herbert (1920–1992) actor. Noted for roles in Bridge on the River Kwai and Mutiny on the Bounty, The Guns of Navarone and Tobruk.
- Graham Hough, Professor of English, University of Cambridge, 1966–75.
- T. P. M. Lewis, educationalist. In 1984, he published Changi – the lost years (1941–1945): A Malayan Diary, the only diary of internment written at the time.
- Sir Percy McElwaine, the Chief Justice of the Straits Settlement.
- Rev. Alexander Rowan Macneil (1894–1953), Australian military chaplain, and Group Scoutmaster of the Changi Group of Rover Scouts.
- Ezekiel Saleh Manasseh (died 1944), Singaporean rice and opium merchant, died in Changi Prison.
- Jim Milner AM (1919–2007), Former chairman Washington H Soul Pattinson and former President NRMA.
- Ethel Rogers Mulvany (1904–1992), Canadian social worker and teacher. She later published a book of prisoners' recipes to raise funds for former prisoners of war.
- Frank Murray (1912–1993), Belfast doctor
- Sir Alexander Oppenheim, mathematician. In 1984, he published "The prisoner's walk: an exercise in number theory", based in part of his experiences at Changi.
- Lieutenant-General Arthur Ernest Percival, commander of Allied forces in Singapore, following his surrender to the Japanese; he was moved to a camp in China in late 1942.
- Sydney Piddington, postwar Australian mentalist entertainer with wife Leslie, "The Piddingtons" ABC and BBC radio and stage mindreading team, who developed his verbal code in Changi.
- Rohan Rivett (1917–1977), Australian writer, War correspondent and journalist with British Malaya Broadcasting Corporation in Singapore. Formerly a soldier in the Australian Imperial Force. He was captured by the Japanese on 8 March, in Java. His experiences are recorded in his book Behind Bamboo (1946).
- Tjalie Robinson (1911–1974), Dutch Indo-European (Eurasian) author, activist, journalist.
- Ronald Searle, cartoonist.
- Robert Skene, ten-goal polo player.
- The Reverend James Donald (Donald) Smith, British 18th Division, author of And All The Trumpets, a history of his time as a POW in Changi Prison and building the Burma Road.
- Colonel Julian Taylor FRCS, surgeon.
- Ernest Tipson, linguist.
- Sir Michael Turner (1953–1962), Chief Manager of the Hong Kong and Shanghai Bank
- Arthur Varley, Australian Army officer & diarist
- Leo Vroman, Dutch poet.
- Stanley Warren, artist and art teacher; murals produced during his incarceration remain at the prison.
- Ian Watt (1917–1999), literary critic, literary historian and professor of English at Stanford University.
- Leonard Wilson, Bishop of Singapore, and later Bishop of Birmingham.
- Sir Michael Woodruff, surgeon and scientist.

=== Convicted criminals after World War II ===
- Hiroshi Abe, Japanese war criminal
- Nick Leeson, former derivatives broker convicted of rogue trading in the collapse of Barings Bank
- Usman Haji Muhammad Ali and Harun Thohir, executed in 1968 for the MacDonald House bombing
- Adrian Lim, Catherine Tan Mui Choo and Hoe Kah Hong, hanged on 25 November 1988 for the 1981 Toa Payoh ritual murders.
- Sek Kim Wah, hanged on 9 December 1988 for killing three people in the 1983 Andrew Road triple murders. He was also involved in an unrelated double murder near Seletar Road.
- Anthony Ler, hanged on 13 December 2002 for soliciting and hiring a 15-year-old youth to murder his wife Annie Leong.
- Mohammed Ali bin Johari, hanged on 19 December 2008 for murdering his stepdaughter Nonoi in March 2006.
- Kho Jabing, a Malaysian who robbed and murdered 40-year-old Chinese construction worker Cao Ruyin in 2008. He was sentenced to death in 2010, and hanged on 20 May 2016, after nearly a 6-year-long legal battle against the death penalty.
- Micheal Anak Garing, one of the main perpetrators of the 2010 Kallang Slashings who was convicted of murder and executed in March 2019 for the fatal and grievous assault of 41-year-old Shanmuganathan Dillidurai (who was the final victim of the case).
- Iskandar bin Rahmat, former police officer and convicted murderer of the 2013 Kovan Double Murders case.
- Teo Ghim Heng, former property agent and charged for murder of the 2017 Woodlands double murders case.
- Van Tuong Nguyen, a Vietnamese-Australian executed in 2005 for drug trafficking
- Peter Lloyd, an Australian journalist with the Australian Broadcasting Corporation arrested in July 2008 for drug trafficking and possession
- Mimi Wong and Sim Wor Kum, the first couple to be hanged in Singapore for murder. Wong was additionally the first woman to be executed in Singapore.
- Sunny Ang, the first person to be convicted of murder without a body in Singapore. He was hanged in 1967.
- Z, the minor who was detained indefinitely from 2001 to 2018 for helping Anthony Ler to kill his wife
- Nagaenthran K. Dharmalingam, Malaysian drug trafficker hanged on 27 April 2022 for importing 42.72g of heroin in 2009
- Pannir Selvam Pranthaman, Malaysian drug trafficker hanged on 8 October 2025 for importing 51.84g of heroin in 2014
- Abdul Kahar Othman, a Singaporean drug trafficker hanged on 30 March 2022 for importing 66.77g of diamorphine in 2010
- The suspect, unnamed due to his age, of the 2021 River Valley High School murder attack (pending trial, held pre-trial after being transferred)
- S. Iswaran, former Minister for Transport, convicted of 5 charges and sentenced to 1 year jail in Changi Prison.

== In popular culture ==
- King Rat (Clavell novel), by James Clavell
- King Rat (film), based on the novel
- Changi: The fortunes of a fictional group of Australian POWs were dramatised in this television miniseries, screened by Australian Broadcasting Corporation in 2001.
- Inside Maximum Security: a 2022 CNA-produced documentary series relating to the lives of five inmates at Changi Prison

== See also ==
- Changi Murals
- Double Tenth incident
- John Mennie – prisoner who drew life in the camps and the Selarang Square Squeeze.
- Kempeitai East District Branch
- Selarang Barracks Incident
