= Regent High School =

Regent High School formerly South Camden Community School and Sir William Collins Secondary School

Location
- Chalton Street; Somers Town, London, NW1 1RX; England; 51.53415°N 0.13304°W

Information
- Type: Community school
- Motto: Latin: Nil Sine Labore (Nothing without effort)
- Established: Leased 1873 (existed prior)
- Founder: London School Board (1877)
- Local authority: Camden
- Department for Education URN: 100051 Tables
- Ofsted: Reports
- Headteacher: Gary Moore
- Gender: Coeducational
- Age: 11 to 18
- Enrolment: 1,029 as of March 2023
- Houses: 7 houses
- Colours: Blue, Orange, Green, Red, Yellow, Purple and Salmon
- Publication: Mosaic, Artisan
- Affiliations: Reed Group, IiP, Camden Consortium, Eco-Schools
- Website: www.regenthighschool.org.uk

Former SCCS logo

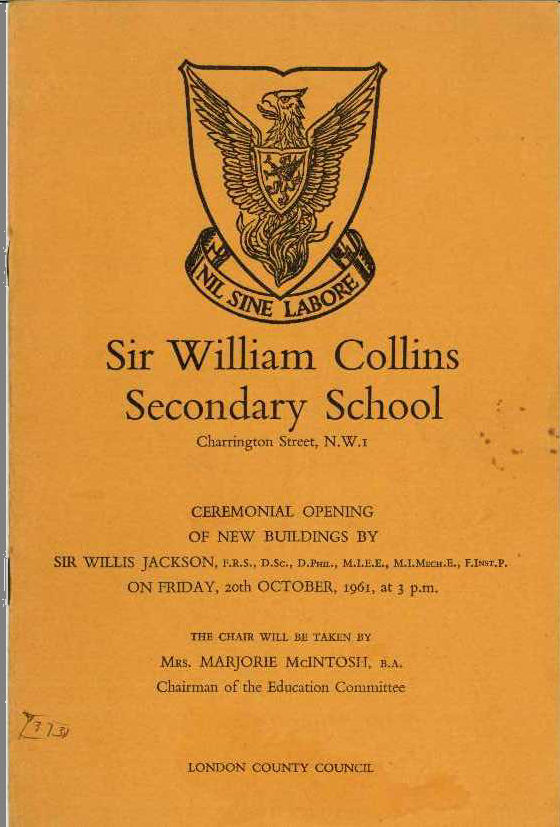
Opening of the new extension by Sir Willis Jackson 20 October 1961, including school logo and motto

Regent High School (RHS), formerly South Camden Community School (SCCS; 1993 to 2012) and Sir William Collins Secondary School (1951 to 1993), is a coeducational secondary school and sixth form located in Somers Town, in the London Borough of Camden, England.

The name was last changed in an attempt to shed what staff feared was a "negative perception" of the school rooted in its past. The school had a rebuilding and refurbishment programme from 2011 to 2013. The school's accreditations include Healthy Schools, Sportmark, Leading Parent Partnership award and International Schools status.

== Introduction ==
The school has partnerships with a wide range of local, national and global organisations, and its vision is to become a hub for the local community.

An Ofsted inspection for Regent High, in November 2012 and published in 2013, rated the school as "good" and praised students' achievement, the quality of teaching, the behaviour and safety of students and the leadership and management of the school.

The school previously held 'Specialist Arts' status, giving students access to a number of opportunities, trips and visits, to develop their confidence and self-esteem.

The school has 'Advanced Skills Teachers' in Maths, Science and Drama, recognised for their classroom teaching practice. Teaching staff were finalists in the 2011 Rolls-Royce Science Award, an annual awards programme recognising inspirational teaching in science, technology, engineering and maths (STEM). In 2012, the school's English and Humanities departments created a CD for Camden Borough Literacy Resources, which was made available for all schools in Camden and which is designed to encourage sharing of best practice across the borough.

The school's accreditations include; Artsmark Gold, Teaching Awards, Investor in People, Stonewall School Champions, Sustainable Travel and International Schools status.

Plans for redevelopment of Regent High School were proposed in January 2010 and approved on 6 August 2010. In the school year 2015/ 2016, the school was rated 'Needs to improve' by school inspectors. In the same school year the school took part in a video for 'Meet the Parents'.

== History ==
The school dates from 1873, when the London School Board leased the site, although a school had existed there before. The new school was completed and opened in 1877, as "Medburn Street School". In 1904, it was renamed the "Stanley School", though reversed in 1910 to avoid confusion with another nearby Stanley School. It originally took children up to age eleven, later extended to older pupils.

After 1938, following various reorganisations, the school no longer took pupils under eleven-years-old.

In 1951 it merged with part of the North London Polytechnic school for boys, based in Prince of Wales Road, Kentish Town, and became a boys school, "Sir William Collins School", named after Sir William Job Collins, an eminent surgeon and local politician. During the 1950s the school was considered to be a "technical school", academic studies were taught at the Medburn Street site, technical and science subjects at the Polytechnic in Kentish Town.

The school added "Secondary" to its title around 1960 when it became a comprehensive school, though still for boys only. This was part of the London County Council policy at the time for all inner London schools. It then became "South Camden Community School" in 1993.

The original Victorian school buildings were located between Chalton Street and Medburn Street; Medburn Street was used as the address. Medburn Street was demolished when, between 1958 and 1961, the London County Council extended the site and buildings to Charrington Street, which became the new address with the school offices located on that side. The new extensions were officially opened in October 1961 by eminent engineer Sir Willis Jackson (later Lord Jackson of Burnley). The extensions had, however, already been partially occupied in 1960 out of necessity with the large expansion of pupils, to approximately 1,100 at the time, which made it one of the largest schools in inner London.

The site for the new extension was about 5 acres (20,000 m^{2}). The cost at the time was £375,000, and a further £36,500 for furniture and equipment. The architect was Mr William Crabtree, FRIBA and the general contractor Gee, Walker & Slater Ltd. The design consisted of interconnected quadrangles, designed to have as many rooms looking inwards as possible.

=== Rebranding ===
The school was rebranded and renamed in 2012. The new name was chosen after consultation with students, staff and governors, and the construction of a £25 million new building with classrooms, a fully equipped gym, three all-weather multi-use pitches, science laboratories, a theatre with professional lighting and staging, drama studios, music recital rooms, technology suites, a recording studio, four art studios, a media studies suite and a large library. The school plans to use the new building to become a hub for their community and partner primary schools.

== Ofsted ==
In November 2012 Regent High School was rated as a "good" school under the new Ofsted framework. The inspection praised students' achievement, the quality of teaching, the behaviour and safety of students and the leadership and management of the school. Inspectors found that "all staff share a relentless drive to raise the achievement of students, that the school's broad curriculum caters for students' individual learning needs and interests, and that 'teaching supports students' social, moral, spiritual and cultural development strongly". The report said that the school's "capacity to secure and maintain improvement is reflected by the significant yearly improvements in attainment and achievement", that "GCSE and equivalent results obtained by Year 11 students have improved well... due to the very strong emphasis on learning" and that "a significant proportion [of students] made outstanding progress in 2012".

Regent Sixth Form was also rated "good". Inspectors said that "the achievement of students leaving in Year 13 is good, especially for students studying vocational qualifications" and that "the success of the school's drive to improve students' life chances is reflected in the greater proportion of students progressing to higher education".

In 2015 following a decline in standards, examination results, and behaviour, Camden Local Authority placed the school on a "Notice to Improve", although the school was not inspected by Ofsted. The next Ofsted inspection came in January 2018, 17 months after the new headteacher was appointed. The school received a "good" rating, with inspectors praising the headteacher's "vision, drive and determination" together with improvements in behaviour and a culture of high expectations. Pupils reported that they feel safe and the new PSHRE programme was well received.

== Location ==
Located just north of central London, in the Borough of Camden, Regent High School is partnered with various institutions, including University College London, Rothschild, Sainsbury's and the Francis Crick Institute. The partnerships enhance the school's curriculum, support students preparing for higher education, developing employability skills, and gaining understanding of the world of work. These opportunities form an integral part of the learning environment, where individual students' needs are met and their talents and interests developed. The partnerships also provide continuing professional development opportunities for staff.

== Sixth Form ==
Regent Sixth Form provides AS/A Level and BTEC National courses. The curriculum is extended through work with other local post-16 providers, a mentoring programme and a number of unique initiatives, along with advice on higher education, UCAS applications and career options. The sixth form has an enrichment programme, including nationally-recognised award schemes.

Sixth formers are encouraged to take part in the vertical tutoring system in place at the school, encouraging independence, initiative and leadership.

Sixth formers go on to a range of university courses, including biomedical and forensic sciences, law, nursing and geography at a number of Higher Education institutions.

The sixth form has an "Aim Higher" programme in place, which includes careers days, academic booster sessions and mentoring schemes with UCL, Sainsbury's and British Land. In 2011 the school was in the top 25% of all schools and colleges nationally in terms of progress made by students at Key Stage 5.

== Exam results ==
In 2012, the school had their best ever results with 62% of GCSE students achieving 5+ A*-C grades, including English and Maths, marking a 13 percentage point increase on the previous year's results.

At A-level, post-16 students achieved a 98% pass rate, with 52% of students attaining an A*/A grade or equivalent in their A level and BTEC courses, with two thirds of Year 13 students achieving at least one grade at A*/A.

An Ofsted report from November 2012 stated 'results are improving rapidly'.

== Partnerships ==
The school's location in the city of London facilitates extensive links with professional organisations, businesses and educational institutions. Examples include: UCL, Rothschild, Wellcome Trust, Sainsburys, British Land and The Francis Crick Institute. The collaborative partnerships provide students with unique opportunities such as trips, visits, motivational speakers, masterclasses and mentoring.

Other community partners include: Global Generation, City Learning Centre, Somers Town Community Association, The British Museum, British Library, Age UK Camden, Foundling Museum, Metropolitan Police, Camden Fairtrade Network, Camden Mela and Somerstown Festival, Anne Frank Trust and ARUP, Young Enterprise, Sainsburys and The British Council.

In addition, the school works closely with their primary school partners. Activities and events include masterclasses, taster sessions and educational workshops, and allow for pupils to work with teachers and students from the school.

The school achieved the 2012–2015 Full International Schools Award (ISA), in recognition of their international partnerships with Bububu Secondary School, Zanzibar, Tanzania, UNRWA School, Abu Dis, Palestine and Jongintaba Junior Secondary School, South Africa.

== Headteachers ==
- 1952–1957 – T G Jones BA
- 1958–1968(?) – Authur G Bastin, CBE MA BSc
- 1968–1975 – Mr Edmonson MA Cantab
- 1975–1977(?) – Graham Stewart (actual period of stay was longer)
- 1977(?)–1982(?) – Not known
- 1982(?)–1988(?) – Pamela Turner
- 1988(?)-1990(?) – Richard Green
- 1990(?)–2001 – Huw Salisbury OBE
- 2001–2016 – Rosemary Leeke
- 2016–2026 – Gary Moore
- 2026-Present - Hanna Sheikh

== Notable former teachers ==
- Harry Greenway (former MP), was a Head of Telford House in the 1960s and Deputy Headmaster.
- Stanley Warren, a former Japanese prisoner of war, noted for painting the Changi Murals in the chapel of Changi Prison during captivity, was an art teacher in the 1950s and 1960s, and Deputy Head of Brunel House from 1963 to 1965.

== Notable former pupils ==
- Chris Farlowe, singer
- Clive Carter, actor
- Terry Sue-Patt, actor
- Tommy Lowne, boxer, 1948 Olympic team
- Nasim Ali, former mayor of Camden
- Gifton Noel-Williams, former professional footballer
- Richard Everitt, a white boy stabbed to death by a Bengali gang in 1994

== Publications ==
The school issues an 8-page magazine each term, Regent Reporter.
