= Carl D. Murray =

British astronomer and academic

Carl Desmond Murray (born September 1955) is an Irish academic who is Emeritus Professor of Mathematics and Astronomy at Queen Mary University of London (formerly Queen Mary College). He is a planetary scientist and a world expert on the rings of Saturn. With Stanley Dermott he is the author of a benchmark textbook in the field of Solar System Dynamics.

== Education and career ==
Carl Murray was born September 1955 in Belfast, Northern Ireland, the son of physician Frank Murray. He grew up there and in Newcastle, County Down. He obtained a BSc in Applied mathematics with Astrophysics from Queen Mary College in London in 1977, achieving First Class Honours. He earned a PhD from the same institution in January 1980, with the thesis "Aspects of the Dynamical Evolution of Small Particles in the Solar System" under Iwan P. Williams.

His career has been spent on the staff at Queen Mary College (later known as Queen Mary University of London). He has been a Courtesy Professor in the Department of Astronomy at the University of Florida since 1995.

Murray's interests span all facets of solar system dynamics, encompassing everything from the evolution of minute dust particles to the stability of celestial bodies like planets. Since being selected in 1990, he has been a key member of the Cassini Imaging Team, serving as the sole representative from the United Kingdom. He has studied the intricate dynamics of Saturn's rings, especially the complex and mysterious F-ring, along with gravitational interactions between the rings and neighbouring moons.

In 2007 a team of astronomers from the European Space Agency led by Murray discovered a new moon (the 60th) of Saturn using the Cassini Space Probe.

He has also served as:

(2014–2021) Science Editor for Monthly Notices of the Royal Astronomical Society
(1998–2004) Associate Editor of Celestial Mechanics and Dynamical Astronomy
(1991–2010) Associate/Consulting Editor of Icarus

== Books ==
- Planetary Ring Systems: Properties, Structure, and Evolution, with Matthew S. Tiscareno, 22 March 2018
- Solar System Dynamics, with Stanley F. Dermott, 26 February 2010
- Atlas of the Planar, Circular, Restricted Three-Body Problem, with Othon C. Winter, 1 September 1994
- Expansion of the Planetary Disturbing Function of Eighth Ord, with David Harper, 1 March 1993

== Awards and honours ==
- Fellow of the Royal Astronomical Society (since 1980)
- Member of the International Astronomical Union (since 1985)
- Member of the American Astronomical Society (since 1990)
- Member of the American Geophysical Union (since 2013)

Asteroid (5598) Carlmurray is named in his honour.
