= Tommy Lowne =

English boxer

Thomas Benjamin Lowne

Thomas Benjamin Lowne RAF

Thomas Benjamin Lowne (15 May 1919 – September 2008 ) was a member of the Amateur Boxing Association (A.B.A.) and represented England on many occasions.

== Biography ==
Thomas Benjamin Lowne was born 15 May 1919, St Pancras Hospital, London NW1 to James Richard Peter Lowne and Alice Amy Lowne (née Ellson). He was the 11th of 14 children.

Lowne became a boxer while attending Medburn School, St Pancras, and was also a member of the school football and cricket teams. In March 1930 he received the Medburn Senior Boys School, Champion Under 4 Stone Boxing Championship certificate.

Lowne was called up in June under the Military Training Act 1939 and applied to join the RAF, stating a preference for Air Crew duties. He was called up for active service in March 1940, initially serving in the barrage balloon Corps and subsequently as a tail gunner with 267 Squadron Transportation Ops Mediterranean, North Africa.

Lowne, as a rear gunner, took part in numerous sorties in the Middle East, Cairo, Jerusalem, Palestine, Alexandria, Egypt, Baghdad and Tehran. In May 1943 the squadron was transferred to the North West African coastal Air Force and the general reconnaissance role which later that year helped protect the convoys taking part in the invasion of Sicily and Italy. Lowne remained in Italy for the rest of the war, after which he returned to the United Kingdom where he resumed his boxing career.

In 1945 Lowne received the RAF Wartime Boxing Award and in August 1947 was invited to join the 1948 Olympic Games Training Team by the ABA.

Thomas Lowne married three times, Doris Schuman (daughter Andrea b 1949, son Trevor b 1952), Marion Just (daughter Karina b 1958), Heather Howell (daughter Nicole, son Tristan b 1973).

He is survived by his third wife Heather, and his four children.

== Trophies and awards ==
- The Times A.B.C., 8 st 6 lb, Open Novices Competition 1939, Presented By Lewis C.Lyne Esq.
- Winner T Lowne 10.2.1939
- North West London Divisional Championships, 1.4.47, 8 st 0 lb, Winner
- England v Scotland Wembley, 14 January 1948, T. Lowne
- London ABA Championships, 1949–50, Fly Weight, WINNER
- London v The Army, Royal Albert Hall 30-11-50
- NW DIV ABA v Northern Counties ABA, December 1950
- NW DIV London ABA Championships, 1953, WINNER
- Coronation Representative Match, Hove 1953
- Southern Counties ABA, London ABA North – Western Div.
- London Amateur Boxing Association, Runner-up Fly Weight Championship Empress Hall 25.3.1953
- The winner of F. Park's Trophy, T Lowne, 1953

Other undated awards and trophies:

- War Time Prize
- Senior Boxing Championships, Fly Weight, WINNER
- NW London Division ABA, Fly Weight, 8 st 0 lb, WINNER

Towards the end of his fighting career he was put forward to represent England as part of the 1948 London Olympics boxing team.
