= Diary of a Girl in Changi =

WWII era diary

- Author: Sheila Bruhn
- Publisher: Kangaroo Press
- Publication date: 1994
- ISBN: 0864176198

Diary of a Girl in Changi (ISBN 0864176198) is the diary of Sheila Bruhn (née Allan) and her experiences in Singapore's Changi Prison from 1941 to 1945. It was first published by Kangaroo Press in 1994.
