= Pearl's Hill City Park =

Park in Singapore

Coordinates: 1°17′03.8″N 103°50′21.1″E

- Location within Singapore
- Type: city park
- Location: Pearl's Hill, Singapore
- Area: 9 hectares (90,000 m^{2})
- Founder: James Pearl
- Manager: National Parks Board
- Operator: National Parks Board
- Status: Open

Pearl's Hill City Park is a 9 hectares city park in Singapore built around a reservoir on top of Pearl's Hill. It is located behind Outram Park MRT station.

== See also ==
- List of parks in Singapore
- National Parks Board
