= Stanley Warren =

English painter

Stanley Warren in Singapore, circa 1982

Stanley Warren (1917 England – 20 February 1992, Dorset England) was an English painter. He was a bombardier of the 15th Regiment of the Royal Regiment of Artillery who became known for the Changi Murals he painted at a chapel during his internment in Changi prison in Singapore during World War II.

== Early life ==
Warren was born in England and was a talented artist from a young age. Warren was educated at Hornsey College of Art.

An artist before the war Warren was employed as a commercial designer producing poster ads with the Grenada organisation.

== World War II ==
In January 1940, Warren enlisted in the army to join the fight against Nazi Germany and was posted to the Royal Regiment of Artillery as an observation post assistant. His responsibilities included having to make quick drawings of panoramas used to plot targets for the guns.

In early 1942, Warren was posted overseas to Malaya (former name for Malaysia) with the 15th Field Regiment Royal Artillery after the Japanese had invaded Malaya and Thailand, and Pearl Harbor had been bombed. Upon their arrival, their fight against the Japanese was brutal and short-lived, and soon his battalion began retreating to Singapore. The Changi Garrison, a heavily fortified coastal defence where most of the British forces were based, consisted of three army barracks; the 2nd Battalion Gordon Highlanders in the Selarang Barracks, the Royal Engineers in Kitchener Barracks, and the 9th Coastal Artillery Regiment of the Royal Artillery in Roberts Barracks. By 12 February, the situation in Singapore was desperate and Lieutenant-General Arthur Ernest Percival, General Officer Commanding of HQ Malaya Command, ordered the Changi Garrison to withdraw to Singapore Town.

After the British surrender of Singapore on 15 February 1942, Warren and Allied POWs were ordered to march to Changi for internment; the 15,000 Australians went into Selarang Barracks and the British to Roberts and Kitchener Barracks. Warren was interned at Roberts Barracks and later joined other POWs to work around Singapore, repairing damage inflicted by the Japanese attacks and getting essential services back to working order. The food given to the prisoners was of poor quality and inadequate for men working as slave labour. As a result of this and the harsh treatment meted out by the Japanese guards such as the beatings and executions of escaped prisoners, the men's health and morale began to suffer in the long run.

=== Changi Murals ===
During one of the work parties, Warren was sent to build a road and stairs leading to a memorial to the Japanese dead on Bukit Batok Hill (marked with a Bukit Batok Memorial plaque today, only the stairs and road called Lorong Sesuai are still there to be seen). The chaplain of the regiment, well aware of Warren's religious conviction and artistic background, requested him to decorate the asbestos walls at the altar area of a small open attap-roofed chapel at Bukit Batok. With charcoal salvaged from around the camp, he drew two murals: Nativity, which featured a Malay Madonna and Descent from the Cross in which he included soldiers in uniforms, using his comrades as models. By then, he was becoming ill and was suffering from a severe renal disorder complicated by amoebic dysentery. On 23 May 1942, Warren was lying comatose and was sent to Roberts Barracks in Changi which was converted for use as a hospital for POWs to recuperate.

By mid-August 1942, Warren had recovered enough to be moved to the dysentery wing at Block 151 of Roberts Barracks. Padres Chambers and Payne had heard that Warren had decorated the prisoners' chapel at Bukit Batok. So they asked him if he would do some paintings for St Luke's Chapel, which was recently converted from the ground floor of Block 151, near the area where Warren was recuperating. The chapel was dedicated to St Luke the Physician. Warren agreed, and sought inspiration for the proposed paintings in the Gospels.

On 30 August 1942, at the time when Warren was preparing the draft drawings of the murals, the Japanese began an action which would become known as the Selarang Barracks incident. It was an incident concerning seventeen thousand Anglo-Australian POWs, who were forced to vacate their buildings and be exposed for nearly five days in the open without water or sanitation for refusing to sign a "No Escape Pledge". Against this backdrop, Warren began to paint the murals. No one had asked the Japanese for permission to draw and at no stage did they interfere with his work. Considering the purpose of the murals, Warren felt that the chapel was basically dedicated to peace and reconciliation, and so he choose universal themes for the murals which would embrace all mankind. Paint was not readily available in the camp, but with the aid of the other prisoners, who unquestionably put themselves at great risk, materials to make the paint were gradually acquired — brown camouflage paint, a small amount of crimson paint, white oil paint and billiard chalk were found and brought for Warren use. Despite still being very ill, Warren set to work on the murals in early September 1942. His illness meant that he could only paint for a limited period each day, for perhaps 15 minutes at a time followed by a rest. To compensate as much as he could for the lack of coloured paint, Warren resorted to using large brush strokes and big areas of solid colour when painting. In September 1942, a few weeks after Warren began painting the murals, he was informed that his work party was to be sent north to Thailand to work on the Thai-Burma Railway. A colonel in charge of the hospital, who knew of his work-in-progress murals, intervened to have him transferred back to the hospital so that he could continue on his work in the chapel. Most of Warren's unit who went to the Thai-Burma Railway never returned. Stanley recounted, "Had I gone with them, most certainly, I would have died. So the murals very directly saved my life in the way I could never have foreseen... It's a terrible sense of debt... that one feels to the chapel."

By Christmas 1942, he completed his first mural, the Nativity. Altogether, Warren managed to produce five large murals on the walls of the chapel, each mural being about three metres long, in the following order:

1. Nativity
2. Ascension
3. Crucifixion
4. Last Supper
5. St Luke in Prison

All of them were subjects which are at the very heart of Christian belief. The completed murals uplifted the spirits of the POWs and sick when they sought refuge in the chapel. Warren never put his name on any of his paintings as he considered them "a gift to God". In May 1944, Block 151 with the St Luke Chapel's inspiring murals was designated to become a store for an airfield nearby. The lower portion of St Luke in Prison mural was almost completely destroyed when it was demolished to make a link to an adjoining room. The walls of the chapel were distempered over, hiding the murals from view. Warren was later sent to Kranji in the north of Singapore, not far from the Causeway to Malaya, and remained there until the Japanese surrender on 15 August 1945. After the war, Warren returned to England believing that his murals had been destroyed by Allied bombing towards the end of the war. He married and became an art teacher at the Sir William Collins School, later South Camden Community School and currently Regent High School in Somers Town, London.

== Post-war ==
The murals were discovered in 1958 and a search was made to find the artist. Warren was, by that time, an art teacher at Sir William Collins School, later South Camden Community School and thenRegent High School in Somers Town, north London. Warren had thought that the murals had been destroyed, but was shown a photograph of one of his murals in the Daily Mirror by a colleague at Barnsbury Central school, where he was the Art Teacher in 1957.

Warren was eventually found in 1959 and, after much persuasion, agreed to assist in the restoration project. He made three trips to Singapore between 1963 and 1988 to restore his former paintings. Because of his advanced age, only four of the original murals were fully restored. In the 1990s, the former site of the murals was gazetted as a Heritage Site by the National Heritage Board of Singapore.
