= Changi Chapel and Museum =

War museum in Singapore

Coordinates: 1°21′44″N 103°58′26″E

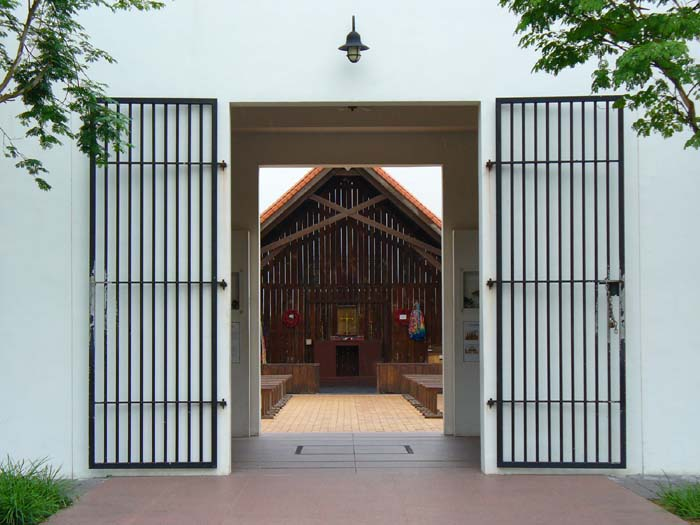
Present day Changi Chapel and Museum

The Changi Chapel and Museum is a war museum dedicated to Singapore's history during the Second World War and the Japanese occupation of Singapore. After the British Army was defeated by the Imperial Japanese Army in the Battle of Singapore, thousands of prisoners of war (POWs) were imprisoned in Changi prison camp for three and a half years. While interned there, the POWs built numerous chapels, one of which was named St George's Church.

== History ==
During the Japanese occupation of Singapore, there were a number of chapels built and rebuilt within and around the Changi Prison, where Allied prisoners of wars were interned. The Japanese did not restrict the POWs' religious activities, and thus the POWs converted existing buildings and utilised scrap materials to build altars and furniture.

Among these chapels, the Roman Catholic Our Lady of Christians Chapel was dismantled after the war and moved to Australia, where it was reconstructed and unveiled in 1988 as part of the Prisoner of War National Memorial in Duntroon, Canberra. This chapel is also known as the Changi Chapel, and is often mistaken for the current replica chapel built next the Changi Prison. The current replica is based on the St George's Church, another chapel which was built during the occupation.

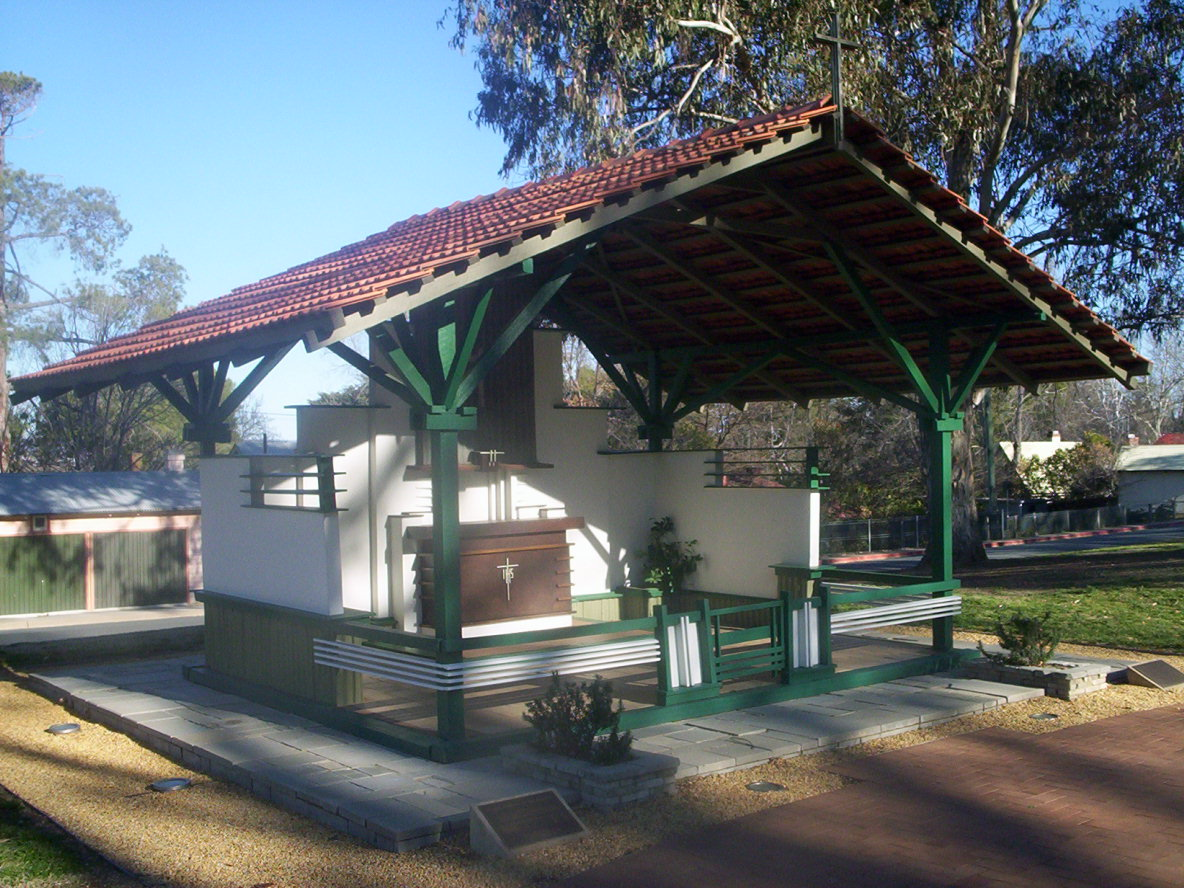
Changi chapel, built by Australian POWs in 1944, later relocated to Duntroon, Canberra

In 1988, Singapore built a museum and replica chapel, based on St George’s Church, next to Changi Prison. When Changi Prison was expanded in 2001, the chapel and museum was relocated to a new site 1 km away and the Changi Chapel and Museum was officially established on 15 February 2001. A brass cross is placed on the altar of the replica chapel. It is known as the Changi Cross, and was made during the occupation by Harry Stogden out of a 45 mm howitzer shell.

From 2001 to 2017, Changi Museum was run by Singapore History Consultants, a private company which offers heritage education and research consultancy services. In 2018, the National Museum of Singapore took over operations of the museum from the Singapore Tourism Board, and it was closed for redevelopment after 17 years of operation.

The museum's reopening in 2020 was delayed a year due to the COVID-19 pandemic, and the newly renamed Changi Chapel and Museum was reopened virtually on 18 May 2021 by Edwin Tong, Minister for Culture, Community and Youth & Second Minister for Law.

== Collection ==
The museum has 114 artefacts on display, including paintings, photographs and personal effects, many of which were donated by former POWs and their families. They give visitors a glimpse into the daily lives of the internees, the challenges they faced and eventual liberation.

Artefacts on display include a 400-page diary and a Kodak Baby Brownie camera, which were painstakingly hidden by some of the internees. The diary belonged to Arthur Westrop, who wrote every entry as a letter to his wife, who was in Africa. The camera belonged to Sergeant John Ritchie Johnston and was given to him by his wife. Johnston managed to bring the camera with him to Changi and hid it from his captors during the entire period of his incarceration.

A re-created Changi Gaol cell gives visitors a glimpse into how the internees were housed and a sense of the cramped living confines of the internees. The re-created cell includes historical recordings of conversations between the internees which offer a glimpse into their living conditions and daily experiences.

Other familiar and significant objects include a section of the Changi Wall, a Morse code device hidden in a matchbox that was used by internees to transmit messages, a set of watercolour paintings by Mary Angela Bateman, who was among the thousands of women and children interned in Changi Prison, and the Changi Murals, a set of five Biblical murals painted by the POW Stanley Warren during his incarceration.

The museum now features eight galleries, which include:

1. Changi Fortress - This section introduces the history of Changi, which in the 19th century was largely covered by mangrove swamps and rainforests. In the 1920s, this quiet idyll began to change as the British started to construct batteries and barracks to protect Singapore from attack.
2. Fallen Fortress - This section covers the fall of Singapore as well as the fate that soldiers and civilians alike faced in the aftermath.
3. The Interned - Approximately 48,000 soldiers and civilians were marched to Changi, which was converted into a vast prison camp. This section spotlights the stories of the men, women, and children who were interned in Changi.
4. Life as POW – The day-to-day lives of those imprisoned in Changi are introduced in this section, along with remnants of the actual Changi Gaol.
5. Resilience in Adversity - This section offers a glimpse into both the hardships that the internees faced as well as how they responded to their situation.
6. Creativity in Adversity - Creative expression was deeply important to the internees, who found ways to write, draw, read, craft, play sports, and even stage concerts and plays. This section showcases their creative works.
7. Liberation - Japan surrendered on 15 August 1945, bringing an end to the three and a half years of the Japanese Occupation of Singapore. This section captures the internees’ feelings about their liberation as well as what happened immediately after the war.
8. Legacies - The legacy of Changi prison camp continues to live on in the present day. In this concluding section, visitors can look up the names and stories of the internees, and view some artefacts that were produced to remember how they had survived the internment.

Some exhibits from the old Changi Museum are no longer on display. These include a series of paintings and sketches by a POW named William Haxworth which provide insight on the daily life of the internees during the occupation. In 1986, Haxworth's wife donated a collection of over 400 paintings and sketches to the National Archives of Singapore.

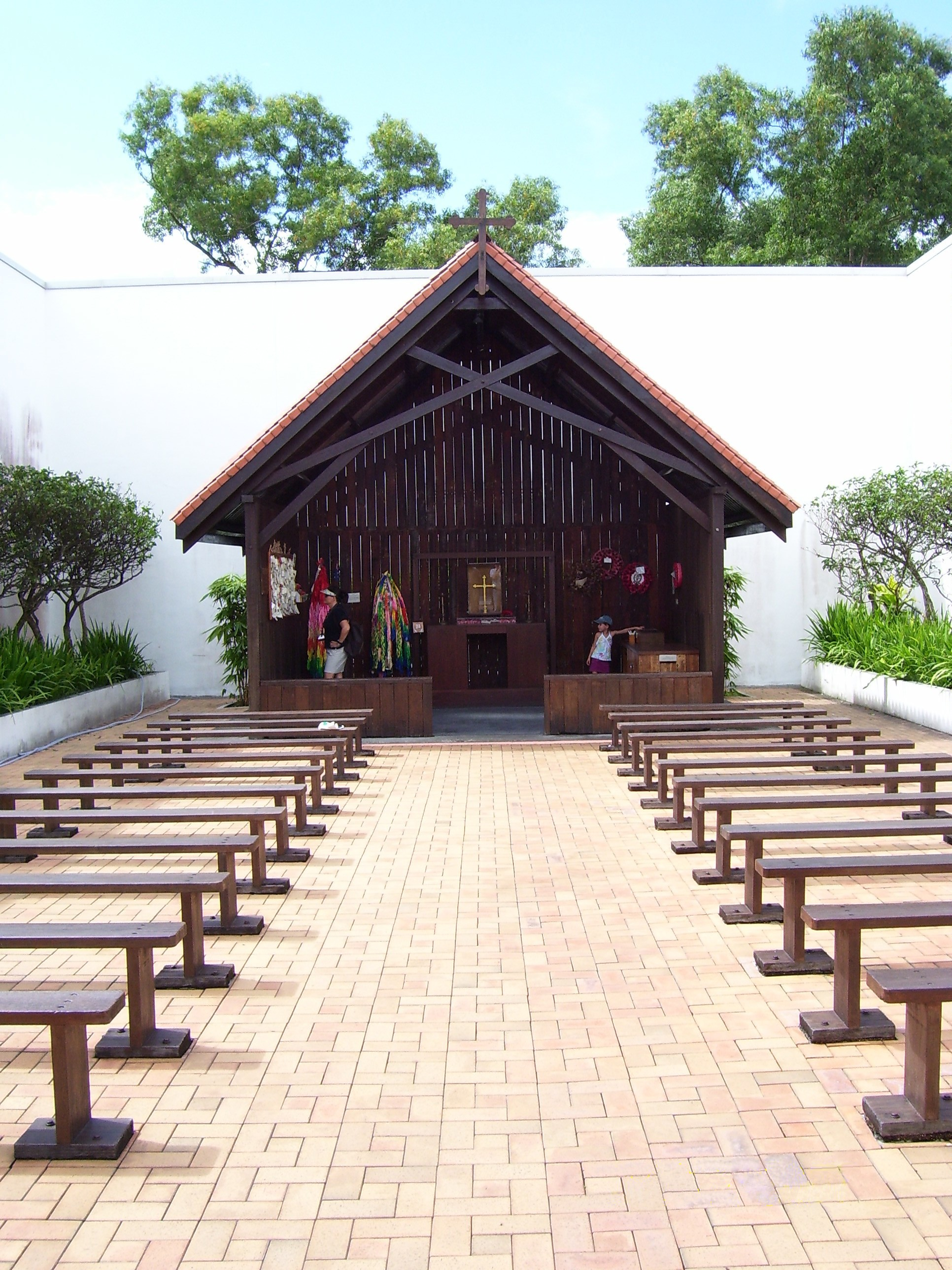
Replica Chapel built in Singapore in 1988 and relocated to present site in 2001

== Literature ==
- Lenzi, Iola (2004). Museums of Southeast Asia. Singapore: Archipelago Press. pp. 200 pages. ISBN 981-4068-96-9.
