= Changi Murals =

Series of five WWII paintings by Stanley Warren

Coordinates: 1°21′25.47″N 103°58′25.11″E

The Nativity, one of the murals drawn by Stanley Warren on the walls of St Luke's Chapel in Roberts Barracks, Singapore

The Changi Murals are a set of five paintings of biblical themes painted by Stanley Warren, a British bombardier and prisoner-of-war (POW) interned at the Changi Prison, during the Japanese occupation of Singapore in the Second World War. His murals were completed under difficult conditions of sickness, limited materials and hardships. With a message of universal love and forgiveness, they helped to uplift the spirits of the POWs and the sick when they sought refuge in the prison chapel.

After the war, the walls of the chapel were distempered over, hiding the murals from view. They were forgotten until their rediscovery in 1958. Due to their historical significance, an international search was conducted to locate the original painter to help in restoring the damaged and faded murals. Warren was eventually found in 1959 and, after much persuasion, agreed to assist in the restoration project. He made three trips to Singapore between 1963 and 1988 to restore his former paintings. Because of his advanced age, only four of the original murals were fully restored. In the 1990s, the former site of the murals was gazetted as a Heritage Site by the National Heritage Board of Singapore.

== History ==
Warren, a commercial designer producing poster ads with the Grenada organisation before World War II, enlisted in the army to join the fight against Nazi Germany and was posted to the Royal Regiment of Artillery as an observation post assistant. His responsibilities included having to make quick drawings of panoramas used to plot targets for the guns.

In early 1942, Warren was posted overseas to Malaya (former name for Malaysia) with the 15th Field Regiment Royal Artillery after the Japanese had invaded Malaya and Thailand, and Pearl Harbor had been bombed. After the British surrender of Singapore on 15 February 1942, Warren and other Allied POWs were interned in Changi with Warren interned at Roberts Barracks. Warren with the POWs worked around Singapore, repairing damage inflicted by the Japanese attacks and getting essential services back to working order.

Stanley Warren in Singapore, circa 1982

=== St Luke's Chapel ===
During one of the work parties, Warren was sent to build a road and stairs leading to a memorial to the Japanese dead on Bukit Batok Hill (marked with a Bukit Batok Memorial plaque today, only the stairs and road called Lorong Sesuai are still there to be seen). The chaplain of the regiment, well aware of Warren's religious conviction and artistic background, requested him to decorate the asbestos walls at the altar area of a small open attap-roofed chapel at Bukit Batok. With charcoal salvaged from around the camp, he drew two murals: Nativity, which featured a Malay Madonna and Descent from the Cross in which he included soldiers in uniforms, using his comrades as models. By then, he was becoming ill and was suffering from a severe renal disorder complicated by amoebic dysentery. On 23 May 1942, Warren was lying comatose and was sent to Roberts Barracks in Changi which was converted for use as a hospital for POWs to recuperate.

By mid-August 1942, Warren had recovered enough to be moved to the dysentery wing at Block 151 of Roberts Barracks. Padres Chambers and Payne had heard that Warren had decorated the prisoners' chapel at Bukit Batok. So they asked him if he would do some paintings for St Luke's Chapel, which was recently converted from the ground floor of Block 151, near the area where Warren was recuperating. The chapel was dedicated to St Luke the Physician. Warren agreed, and sought inspiration for the proposed paintings in the Gospels.

=== The five murals ===
On 30 August 1942, at the time when Warren was preparing the draft drawings of the murals, the Japanese began an action which would become known as the Selarang Barracks incident. It was an incident concerning seventeen thousand Anglo-Australian POWs, who were forced to vacate their buildings and be exposed for nearly five days in the open without water or sanitation for refusing to sign a "No Escape Pledge". Against this backdrop, Warren began to paint the murals. No one had asked the Japanese for permission to draw and at no stage did they interfere with his work. Considering the purpose of the murals, Warren felt that the chapel was basically dedicated to peace and reconciliation, and so he choose universal themes for the murals which would embrace all mankind. Paint was not readily available in the camp, but with the aid of the other prisoners, who unquestionably put themselves at great risk, materials to make the paint were gradually acquired — brown camouflage paint, a small amount of crimson paint, white oil paint and billiard chalk were found and brought for Warren use. Despite still being very ill, Warren set to work on the murals in early September 1942. His illness meant that he could only paint for a limited period each day, for perhaps 15 minutes at a time followed by a rest. To compensate as much as he could for the lack of coloured paint, Warren resorted to using large brush strokes and big areas of solid colour when painting. In September 1942, a few weeks after Warren began painting the murals, he was informed that his work party was to be sent north to Thailand to work on the Thai-Burma Railway. A colonel in charge of the hospital, who knew of his work-in-progress murals, intervened to have him transferred back to the hospital so that he could continue on his work in the chapel. Most of Warren's unit who went to the Thai-Burma Railway never returned. Stanley recounted, "Had I gone with them, most certainly, I would have died. So the murals very directly saved my life in the way I could never have foreseen... It's a terrible sense of debt... that one feels to the chapel."

By Christmas 1942, he completed his first mural, the Nativity. Altogether, Warren managed to produce five large murals on the walls of the chapel, each mural being about three metres long, in the following order:

1. Nativity
2. Ascension
3. Crucifixion
4. Last Supper
5. St Luke in Prison

All of them were subjects which are at the very heart of Christian belief. The completed murals uplifted the spirits of the POWs and sick when they sought refuge in the chapel. Warren never put his name on any of his paintings as he considered them "a gift to God". In May 1944, Block 151 with the St Luke Chapel's inspiring murals was designated to become a store for an airfield nearby. The lower portion of St Luke in Prison mural was almost completely destroyed when it was demolished to make a link to an adjoining room. The walls of the chapel were distempered over, hiding the murals from view. Warren was later sent to Kranji in the north of Singapore, not far from the Causeway to Malaya, and remained there until the Japanese surrender on 15 August 1945. After the war, Warren returned to England believing that his murals had been destroyed by Allied bombing towards the end of the war. He married and became an art teacher at the Sir William Collins School, later South Camden Community School and currently Regent High School in Somers Town, London.

=== Rediscovery ===
Forgotten for nearly 13 years, the Changi Murals were accidentally rediscovered in 1958 by servicemen of the Royal Air Force (RAF) occupying the Roberts Barracks. The chapel was again used as a store, and later as accommodation by the RAF. Once rediscovered, the distemper coating covering the murals was carefully removed – four complete murals and the top-quarter of a fifth were revealed. As there was no signature on any of the murals, a search for the artist was undertaken but failed after initial investigations. By a stroke of luck, the artist's name came to light in the RAF Changi Education Library of all places. A reader came across a book titled The Churches of the Captivity in Malaya, mentioning about the Chapel of St Luke in Roberts Barracks and the artist's name – Bombardier Stanley Warren. The Daily Mirror was notified and again went to work looking for the known artist. In February 1959, he was found living in London with his wife and son. He was shocked when he saw the photo of his mural of the Crucifixion, when a keen-eyed colleague of his showed him the papers.

=== Restoration ===
In 1960, the RAF contacted Warren and the idea of restoring the murals was brought up. He was initially reluctant to return to restore his works due to the painful memories of war and captivity the murals would bring back to him: "I didn't immediately want to come. I felt that there would be some sort of... trauma. I'm trying to forget this, you know, I tried so hard... It took years really to eliminate the memories and fears... the long drawn out experience and really waiting for death over three and a half years, it's long time to expect death. And I really tried to forget... But of course I was never able to do that."

After much persuasion, he overcame his fear and eventually made three trips to Singapore to restore his murals in December 1963, July 1982 and May 1988. The 1982 restoration was more intensive and the invaluable assistance given to Warren by the officers and boys of the SAF Boys' School enabled the bulk of the work to be completed. Of the original five murals, only one was not fully restored; the mural of St Luke in Prison. Warren's original tracing of the drawing was missing, and he could not remember the details of the missing portion. In 1985, Warren's original drawing was discovered in the memorabilia of Wally Hammond who had been a fellow prisoner with Warren. These original sketches were subsequently donated to the National Archives of Singapore. From the original, Warren painted a small picture, which was placed below the remaining piece of the mural in 1988. He was, by then, not fit enough to restore the actual mural.

On 20 February 1992, Warren died in his home in Bridport, England, at the age of 75.

=== Parliamentary discussions ===
Warren's murals were discussed in the British Parliament in October 1968. Charles Morris, member of parliament for Openshaw, asked the defence minister, Denis Healey, to consider moving the murals to England. His proposal was unsuccessful when the Singapore Ministry of Defence decided to take responsibility for the murals and to keep them in good condition for display in 1969. (Singapore had gained independence from Britain in August 1965). In addition, a copy of one of the murals painted by Warren had been brought to England and installed in the Garrison Church at Larkhill in Wiltshire.

== The murals today ==
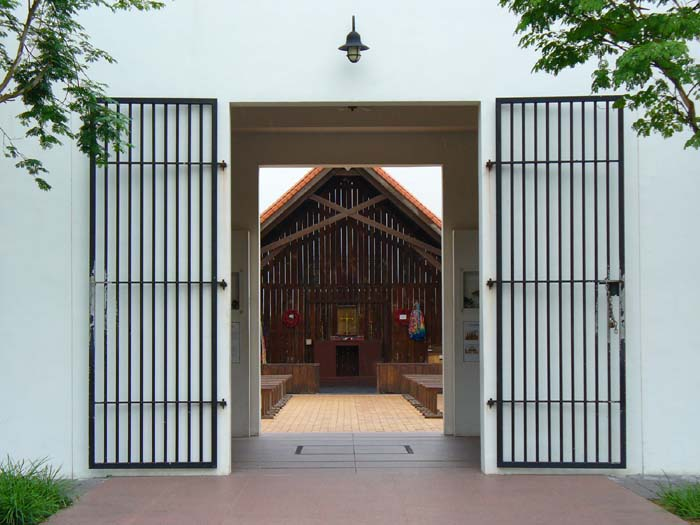
The main entrance leading to the Changi Chapel and Museum at Upper Changi Road North

The three-storey Block 151 of Roberts Barracks (off Martlesham Road) still stands, but is now part of the Ministry of Defence's Changi Airbase Camp. Most of the buildings surrounding Block 151 were demolished in July 2003. However, for public interest, a replica of Stanley Warren's murals is also on display at the Changi Chapel and Museum, along with an audio-visual theatre that screens videos about POW life, display of POW belongings and collection of books about Singapore during the Second World War.

Since 1993, the Changi Murals, Changi Prison and other Second World War sites in Singapore have been part of a Battlefield Tour organised by the National Institute of Education and the Ministry of Defence, a bi-annual five-day residential National Awareness programme to create greater awareness of national and security issues among trainee teachers.

=== Commemoration ===
In November 1994, a two-man British team was in Singapore to film the Changi Murals and Kranji War Memorial for a BBC documentary, for the Commonwealth War Graves Commission which marked the 50th anniversary of the end of the Second World War.

On 15 February 2002, more than 250 former POWs and their families from Australia, New Zealand and the United Kingdom went to Singapore for a reunion-cum-memorial service that was held at the Changi Chapel and Museum, and a tour of the Changi Murals and the Selarang Camp. The event was organised by the Singapore Tourism Board to mark the 60th anniversary of the fall of Singapore.

== See also ==
- Double Tenth Incident
- James Clavell
- Battle of Kranji
