= Selarang Barracks incident =

1942 British prisoners-of-war revolt

Coordinates: 1°22′6″N 103°58′26″E

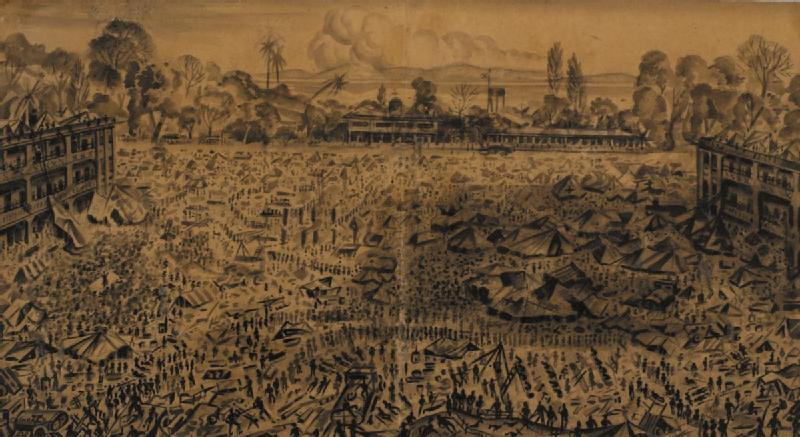
A view from above of a square crowded with prisoners-of-war surrounded by the buildings of a military barracks. There is one building to the left and one to the right, with another building in the background with trees and vegetation either side of it. Within the square are thousands of prisoners, some visible at work in the foreground, and a large number of tents, some with a red cross symbol painted on them.

On 30 August 1942, British and Australian prisoners-of-war (POWs) revolted against their Japanese captors in the Selarang Barracks camps in Changi, Singapore. The Japanese had recaptured four POWs who escaped from the camps, and required that the other prisoners sign a pledge not to escape. After they refused, they were forced to crowd in the areas around the barracks square for nearly five days with little water and no sanitation. The executions of the recaptured POWs failed to break the men. The commanders, however, finally capitulated on 5 September when their men started to fall ill and die from dysentery. Upon signing the pledge, the men were allowed to return to the barracks buildings.

== History ==
=== Changi ===
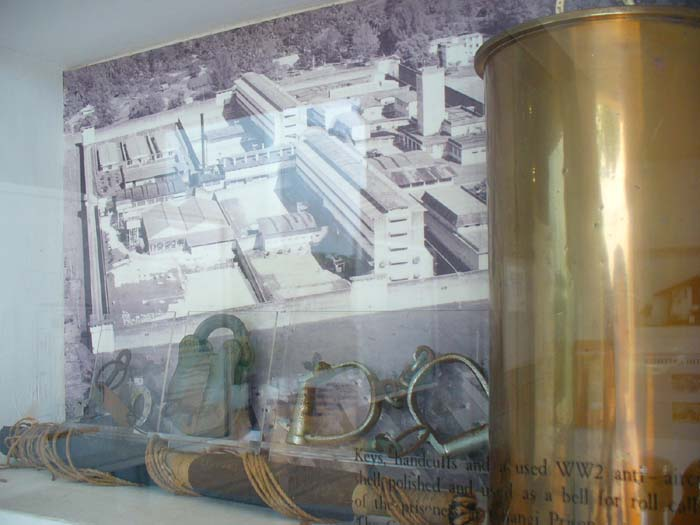
A display of POW artefacts at the Changi Chapel and Museum. The picture in the background shows Changi Prison during World War II

Built in 1938, the Selarang Barracks was part of the Changi Garrison, a heavily fortified coastal defence where most of the British forces were based during the Battle of Singapore. The Selarang Barracks housed the 2nd Battalion Gordon Highlanders, a British Army infantry regiment which recruited its soldiers mainly from North East Scotland. The Royal Engineers and the 9th Coastal Artillery Regiment of the Royal Artillery were based in nearby Kitchener Barracks and Roberts Barracks respectively. After the British surrender of Singapore on 15 February 1942, Allied POWs were ordered by the Japanese to march to Changi for internment. As the British-built Changi Prison was already crowded with Allied POWs and civilians, the surrounding barracks including Selarang Barracks were used by the Japanese as a holding area for Australian and British POWs.

On 30 August 1942, as a pre-emptive measure, the newly arrived Japanese Commander General Shimpei Fukuye wanted the wholly British and Australian POWs interned at Selarang Barracks in Changi to sign a "No Escape Pledge" after the recapture of four escaped prisoners from Changi Prison earlier. The four escapees were Australian Corporal Rodney Breavington and Private Victor Gale, and British soldiers, Private Harold Waters and Private Eric Fletcher. The pledge reads: "I the undersigned, hereby solemnly swear on my honour that I will not, under any circumstances, attempt to escape." With three exceptions, everyone refused to sign, because the prisoners saw it as their duty to escape if they could. Under the Geneva Convention, POWs had the right to attempt to escape and they were not supposed to be punished if they were recaptured. However, at that time, Japan was not a signatory to the Geneva Convention although it was the signatory of the 1907 Hague Convention, which provided humane treatment of prisoners of war (POWs) and it had also signed the Kellogg-Briand Pact in 1929, thereby rendering its actions liable to charges of crimes against peace. General Fukuye was furious at the mass display of insubordination and the following day he ordered all prisoners, except the three who had agreed to sign, to congregate at the parade square in Selarang Barracks. What ensued was to become known as the "Selarang Barracks Incident".

The Selarang Barracks, originally built to accommodate 800 men, consisted of a parade ground surrounded on three sides by three-storey buildings. A number of smaller houses for officers and married couples were spread out in the spacious grounds. Nearly 17,000 men crammed into a parade ground of about 128 by 210 metres and in the surrounding areas. An Australian POW, George Aspinall documented the situation:

The first and most urgent problem we had to face up to was the lack of toilet facilities. Each barracks building had about four to six toilets, which were flushed from small cisterns on the roofs. But the Japanese cut the water off, and these toilets couldn't be used. The Japanese only allowed one water tap to be used, and people used to line up in the early hours of the morning and that queue would go on all day. You were allowed one water bottle of water per man per day, just one quart for your drinking, washing, and everything else. Not that there was much washing done under the circumstances.

=== Executions ===
When there were no signs of the POWs backing down on the third day, General Fukuye ordered the Commander of the British and Australian troops in Changi, Lt-Col E. B. Holmes and his deputy, Lieutenant Colonel Frederick Galleghan, to attend the execution of the four recent escapees: Breavington, Gale, Waters and Fletcher. One of the Australians, Breavington, pleaded to no avail that he was solely responsible for the escape attempt and should be the only one executed. Their executions were carried out by the Indian National Army guards with rifles on 2 September. The initial volley was non-fatal, and the wounded men had to plead to be finished off.

Despite the executions, the prisoners remained firm as the days ensued. Without food and little water available and coupled with latrine pits, kitchens and hospital beds crowded into an area of about a square kilometre, dysentery broke out quickly and the sick began to die. Realising that more would die needlessly, the prisoners' commanders decided that they and their men would sign the pledge "under duress". On 4 September, Lt-Col Holmes issued a written order to his men:

The requirement by the Imperial Japanese Army, issued under their Order No.17 dated 31 August '42 that all ranks of the POW Camp Changi, should be given the opportunity to sign a certificate of promise not to escape, has now been amended in a revised Imperial Japanese Army Order No.17 dated 2 September '42 to a definite order that all officers, NCOs, and Men of the POW Camp shall sign this undertaking. I therefore now order that these certificates will be signed by all ranks, and handed by Area Commanders to Command Headquarters by 1100 hrs on 5 September '42. The circumstances in which I have been compelled to issue this order will be made the subject of Selarang Special Order No. 3 which will be issued later.

As the Japanese were not familiar with British names, the POWs signed using false or meaningless names. One of the most common signatures among the Australians was that of folk hero Ned Kelly. After the signing was completed, the Japanese allowed the prisoners back to their former areas on 5 September, thus ending the incident. Dr. Frank Murray recorded in his diary that the medical staff signed on medical grounds only because of diphtheria and dysentery epidemics.

=== Singapore War Crimes Trial ===
During the Singapore War Crimes Trial in 1946, General Fukuye was sentenced to death on 28 February and executed by firing squad on 27 April at the spot where the four POWs had been shot three years earlier. Fukuye died instantly after shouting "Banzai".

=== Epitaphs ===
The four executed POWs were later honoured and buried at the Kranji War Memorial after the war.

== Selarang Barracks today ==
After the war, the Selarang Barracks became the home for most of the Australian Army units of ANZUK, a tripartite force formed by Australia, New Zealand and the United Kingdom to defend the Asia-Pacific region, until its disbandment in 1974. Today, Selarang Barracks is the headquarters for the 9th Division of the Singapore Armed Forces (SAF), and access to the camp is restricted.

=== Remembrance ===
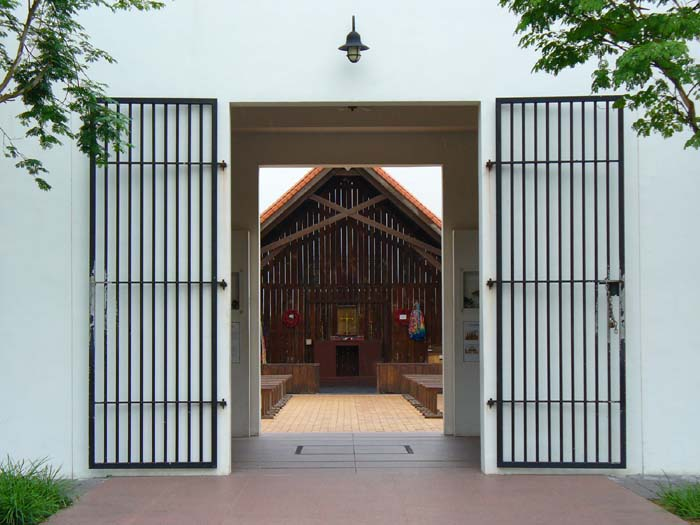
The main entrance leading to the Changi Chapel and Museum at Upper Changi Road North, Singapore. In the background lies the replica of the Changi Chapel

The Changi Chapel and Museum was built in 1988 as a dedication to those who lived and died in Singapore during World War II. It also serves as an educational institution and resource centre documenting the events of the Japanese occupation of Singapore. The Selarang Barracks Incident, Double Tenth Incident and other stories are retold on the storyboard displays. There are also displays of tools, materials and personal belongings of POWs and other artefacts. The items were donated from organisations, POWs and their families and visitors.

On 19 April 1996, Australian Foreign Minister Alexander Downer and his wife, Nicky, went to Changi Prison, to see the cell his father was kept in as a prisoner-of-war during World War II. His father, Sir Alexander Downer, was interned in Selarang Barracks from 1942 to 1943 and in Changi Prison from 1943 to 1944. Downer also visited the Changi Memorial Chapel, where Sir Alexander had worshipped during his internment, the Selarang Barracks, and the camp parade square.

== See also ==
- Double Tenth Incident
- Changi Murals
- Far East prisoners of war
- Kempeitai East District Branch
- John Mennie – prisoner who pictured life in the camps and the Selarang Square Squeeze.
