= Francis Murray =

Francis Murray may refer to:

- Francis Murray (mayor) (1838–1872), alderman and mayor of Brisbane, Australia
- Francis Edwin Murray (1854–1932), poet
- Francis Joseph Murray (1911–1996), mathematician
- Francis Murray (physician) (1912-1993), Irish physician
- Franny Murray (1915–1998), American football player
