= T. P. M. Lewis =

British educationalist (1904–1989)

- Born: 26 July 1904
- Died: 10 June 1989 (aged 84)
- Education: Jesus College, Oxford
- Occupation: Educationalist
- Years active: 1926-1976
- Spouse: M. P. Roweli
- Children: 2 sons

T. P. M. Lewis (26 July 1904 – 10 June 1989) was a British educationalist who served in Malaya, and is known for the diary he kept during his three and a half years as a POW in Singapore, which he later published.

== Early life and education ==
T. P. M. Lewis was born on 26 July 1904 into a Welsh family, and educated at Royal Masoninc School, Bushey, Hertfordshire, and at Jesus College, Oxford.

== Career ==
Lewis began his career in 1926 when he joined the Malayan Education Department of the Straits Settlements and Federated Malay States as Assistant Master, and in 1930 was appointed Acting Headmaster of Anderson School, Ipoh, in addition to his other duties. He then served in several schools as headmaster or assistant headmaster including King Edward VII School, Taiping (1932), English College, Johore Bahru (1936), Francis Light School, Penang (1938), and Clifford School, Kuala Lipis (1940).

After the Second World War, during which Lewis spent over three years in captivity in Singapore, he returned to Malaya and rejoined the Malayan Department of Education. In 1948, he was appointed Director of Education, Johore, before being promoted to deputy director of Education, Federation of Malaya, based in Kuala Lumpur.

In 1954, he went to Singapore where he assumed the role of Senior Inspector of Schools, and Director of Education. At the time there was a rapid increase in the number of school age children in Singapore, and there was an insufficient number of teachers and schools. Lewis was responsible for introducing a major school building programme, and the system of morning and afternoon schools where premises were used in two sessions by different pupils and staff.

Lewis left Malaya in 1956 and returned to the United Kingdom where he taught at Abermad Preparatory School, Aberystwyh and in 1968 at Dragon School, Oxford. He retired in 1976, aged 72.

== Internment at Changi and Sime Road POW camps, Singapore ==
Lewis was imprisoned during the Second World War in Changi and Sime Road POW camps in Singapore for three and a half years. During the war, with his fluency in Malay, he volunteered to become a local guide attached to an Australian unit under Major Angus Rose ("Roseforce") which operated behind enemy lines. Four of the six guides were killed or executed by the Japanese.

When Allied forces surrendered, Lewis was interned in Changi prison with his brother John, his other brother Gerwyn having been sent to Burma to work on the railway. During his internment Lewis kept a diary, which was buried in a tin in the prison's vegetable garden, knowing that discovery by the Japanese would have resulted in his execution. The diary, which survived the war, is the only known account of internment in Singapore written at the time, and was later published in a book "Changi - the lost years (1941-1945): A Malayan Diary."

== Death and personal life ==
Lewis died on 10 June 1989. He married M. P. Roweli in 1946 and they had two sons. He was a keen sportsman playing rugby for London Welsh, Perak and North Malaya.

== See also ==
- Changi - the lost years 1941-1945: A Malayan Diary by T. P. M. Lewis (1984)
