= Bukit Batok memorials =

Memorial in Bukit Batok, Singapore

Coordinates: 01°21′3.21″N 103°46′0.37″E

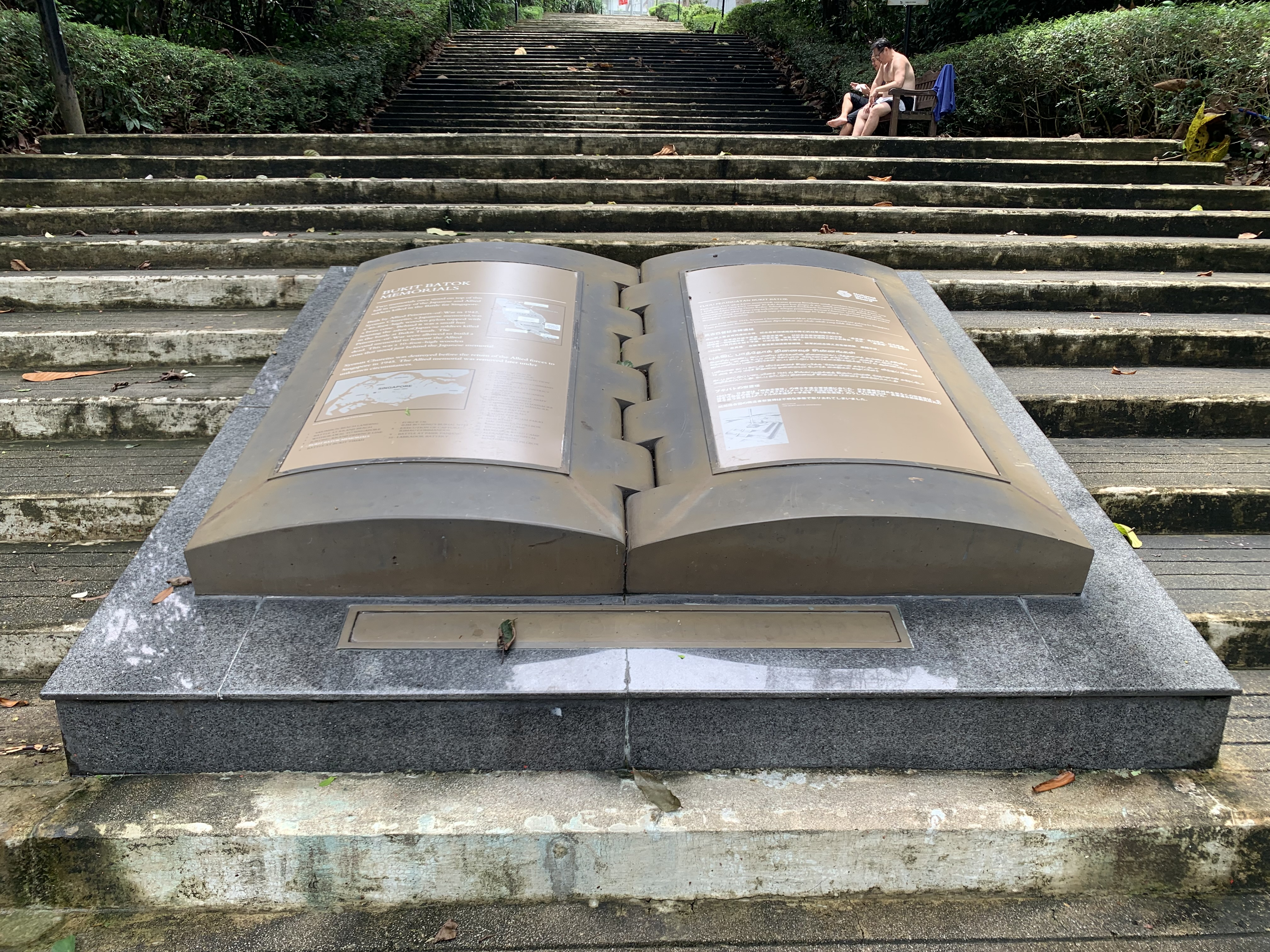
The former stairs and memorial plaque (set in the centre) at Bukit Batok Hill, Singapore as of 2025.

The Bukit Batok Memorial is located on top of the tranquil Bukit Batok Hill upon which once stood two war memorials built by Australian POWs to commemorate the war dead of the Japanese and the Allies who fought during the decisive Battle of Bukit Timah in Singapore during the Second World War. The two memorials were destroyed after the war and only the road and stairs that used to lead to them mark its legacy today.

== History ==
Bukit Batok is located near the Bukit Timah area, where some of the heaviest fighting on the island—the Battle of Bukit Timah took place in early 1942. As a result, in June 1942, the Japanese wanted to build a war memorial and Shinto shrine to commemorate their war dead in the vicinity. Bukit Batok was significant as the 400-foot (120 m) high hill overlooked the Ford Motor Factory where Lieutenant-General Arthur Ernest Percival, General Officer Commanding, HQ Malaya Command, had surrendered over 125,000 British and Commonwealth troops to Lieutenant-General Tomoyuki Yamashita on the evening of 15 February 1942.

=== Allies' Memorial Cross ===
The etched drawing of Syonan Chureito and the Allies' Memorial (depicted behind the Japanese Memorial) on the Memorial Plaque at Bukit Batok Hill today

POW labour was used to build a total of three war memorials, including one dedicated to the fallen of the Indian National Army in June 1945, and a Shinto shrine called Syonan Jinja in MacRitchie Reservoir during the Occupation. English bombardier Stanley Warren of the Changi Murals fame, belonged to one of the work parties that built the stairs and a road named Lorong Sesuai, leading to the two memorials on top of Bukit Batok. The Japanese had originally planned just one memorial called Syonan Chureito for their war dead but the POWs asked the Japanese for permission to build a memorial to their own war dead near the Japanese memorial and had been given permission and materials to erect a 15-foot (4.6 m) wooden cross behind Syonan Chureito. The Japanese had hoped to capitalise on the propaganda value of acceding to the request. The Japanese engineering commander-in-charge of the POWs then was Colonel Yasugi Tamura. About 500 Australian POWs mainly from the Artillery, and Infantry battalions, encamped at Sime Road and Adam Park were marched back and forth each day between the job site and their camp and worked tirelessly until both memorials were completed.

=== Syonan Chureito ===
On the night of 7 December 1942, in a solemn ceremony, the ashes of the Japanese war dead encased in white wooden boxes were brought to the foot of the long flight of steps leading to Syonan Chureito and ceremoniously carried up the torch-lit steps for interment inside a small shrine located at the top. The guest of honour was General Homma Masaharu of Philippines fame. The Japanese memorial was a 12 metres tall wooden mast capped with a brass cone. The words "chu rei to" was inscribed on its side which meant "the sacrifice made by the fallen soldiers". A plain, stout, wooden fence surrounded the memorial. The Allies' memorial was unveiled on the same day by one of the POW camp commanders with a speech thanking the Japanese Army. Military and Japanese officials would regularly worship the Japanese Emperor and the deified spirits of their fallen comrades at Syonan Chureito and Syonan Jinja.

== Post-war years ==
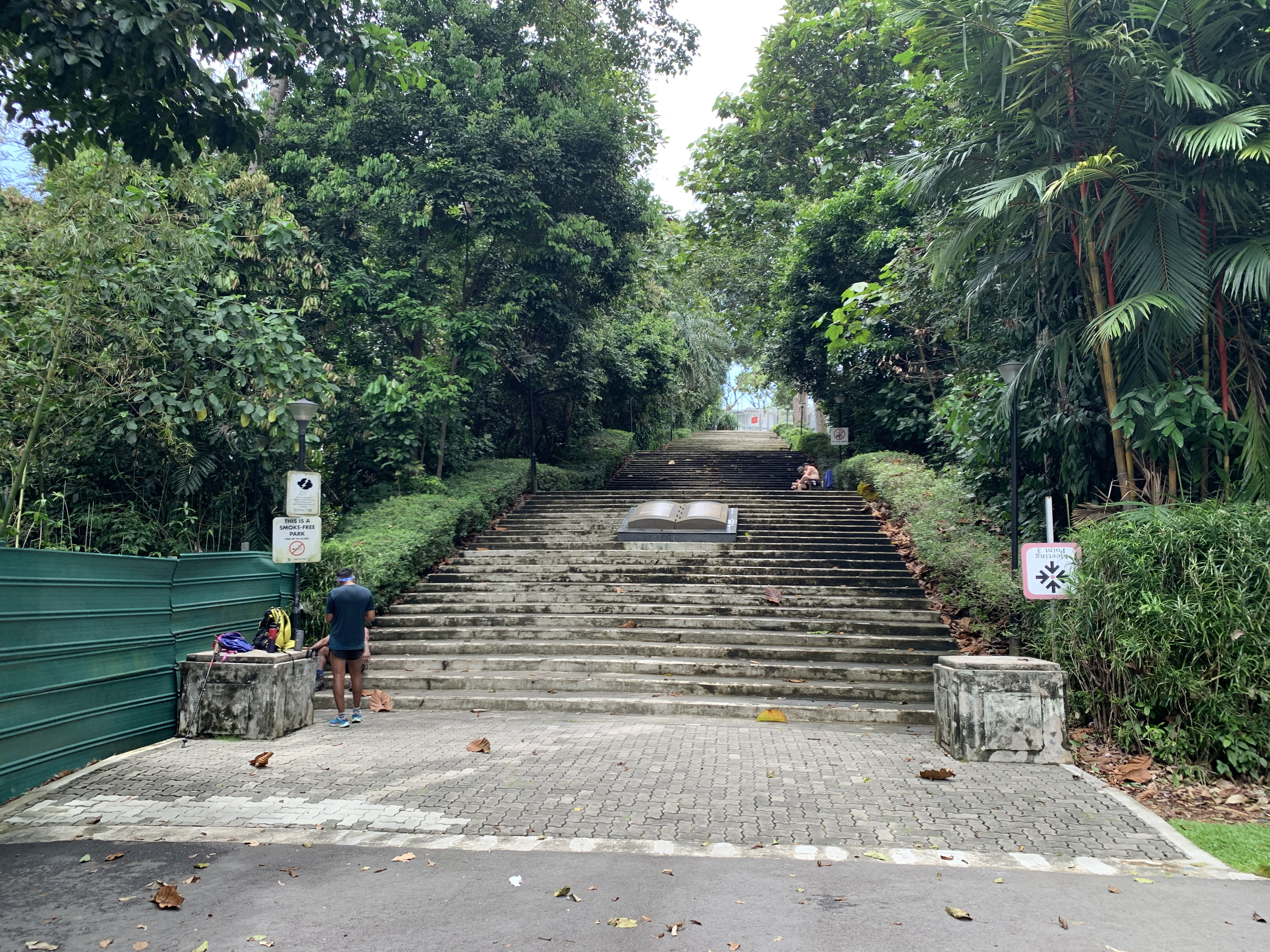
The stairs with the Bukit Batok Memorial in 2025

The two memorials on the hilltop were torn down when the Japanese surrendered and all that remains are two entrance pillars and the 120 steps that now lead to a transmission tower operated by Mediacorp. Like Syonan Chureito, Syonan Jinja was destroyed too after the war to prevent it from being desecrated by the returning Allied forces. The ashes at the Japanese war memorial were subsequently re-interred in the Japanese Cemetery Park in Chuan Hoe Avenue. Upon a suggestion to the authorities by a former Australian POW, S. Hannam, in 1981, the Singapore Tourist Promotion Board and National Heritage Board (NHB) erected a memorial plaque at the foot of the steps to commemorate this little known history and the sufferings of the Australian POWs during the Japanese Occupation of Singapore. In 1995, the NHB gazetted the site as one of the 11 World War II sites in Singapore.
