= Outram Prison =

Former prison in Singapore

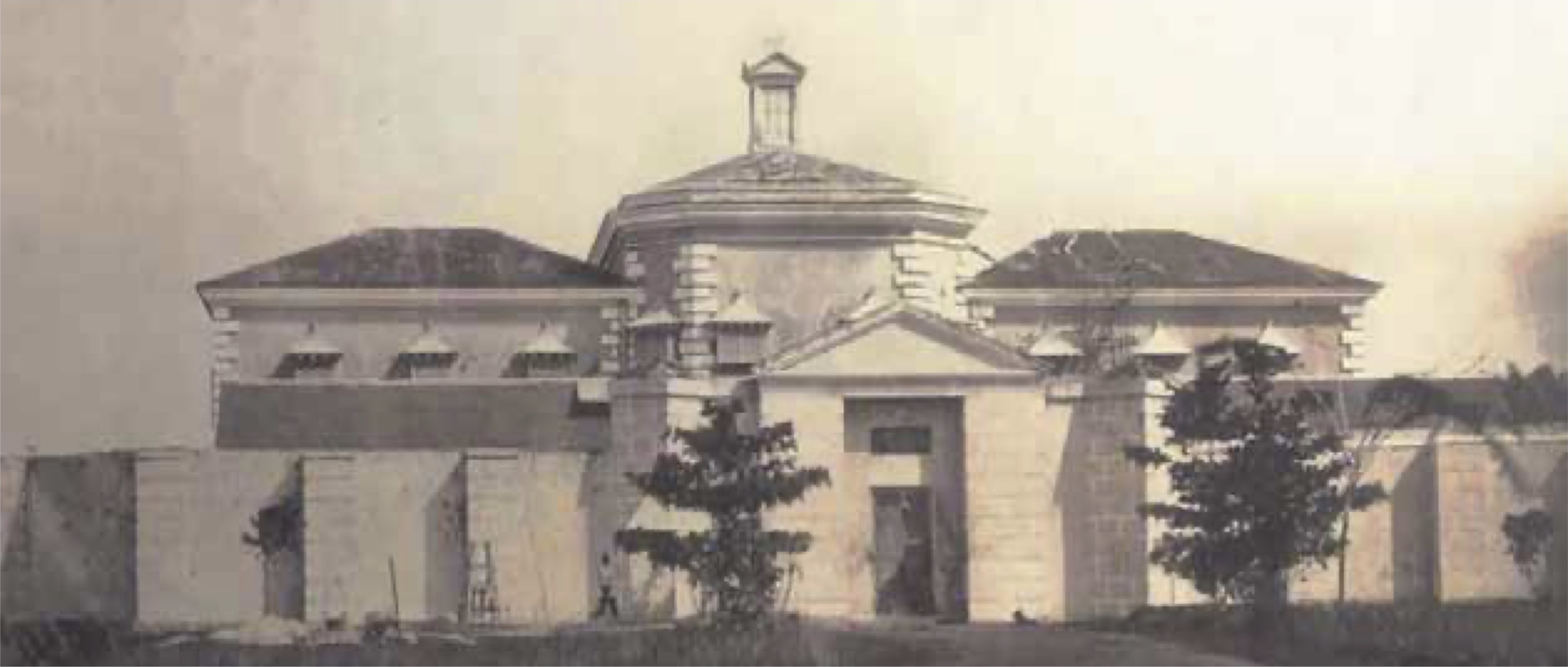
- Outram Prison in the 1850s, then known as the Civil Jail
- Interactive map of Outram Prison
- Location: Outram, Singapore; 1°16′59″N 103°50′15″E
- Status: Demolished
- Opened: 1882; 144 years ago
- Closed: 1963; 63 years ago
- Former name: Pearl's Hill Prison; Civil Jail

Outram Prison, also known as Pearl's Hill Prison, Civil Jail or Singapore Gaol, was a prison at Pearl's Hill, Outram, Singapore. Originally occupied and known as the Civil Jail, Outram Prison was opened in 1882 and served as the main prison complex before the construction of Changi Prison in 1936.

It was demolished in 1963 and replaced by Housing and Development Board (HDB) blocks and a shopping complex.

== History ==
=== Civil Jail ===
In 1847, Charles Edward Faber built the Civil Jail, also known as Her Majesty's Gaol, at the present site at Pearl's Hill, Outram. Two time capsules were buried at the base of the foundation, containing parchment with revenue figures and different types of currency.

In 1872, a Commission of Inquiry into the prison system suggested that current prison regimes had 'lost sight of the punitive aspect of prison life'. After the riot at Bras Basah Jail, a plan to build an extension that would be more secure was considered at either Bras Basah Jail or the Civil Jail; they later decided to build the extension at Civil Jail.

=== Outram Prison ===
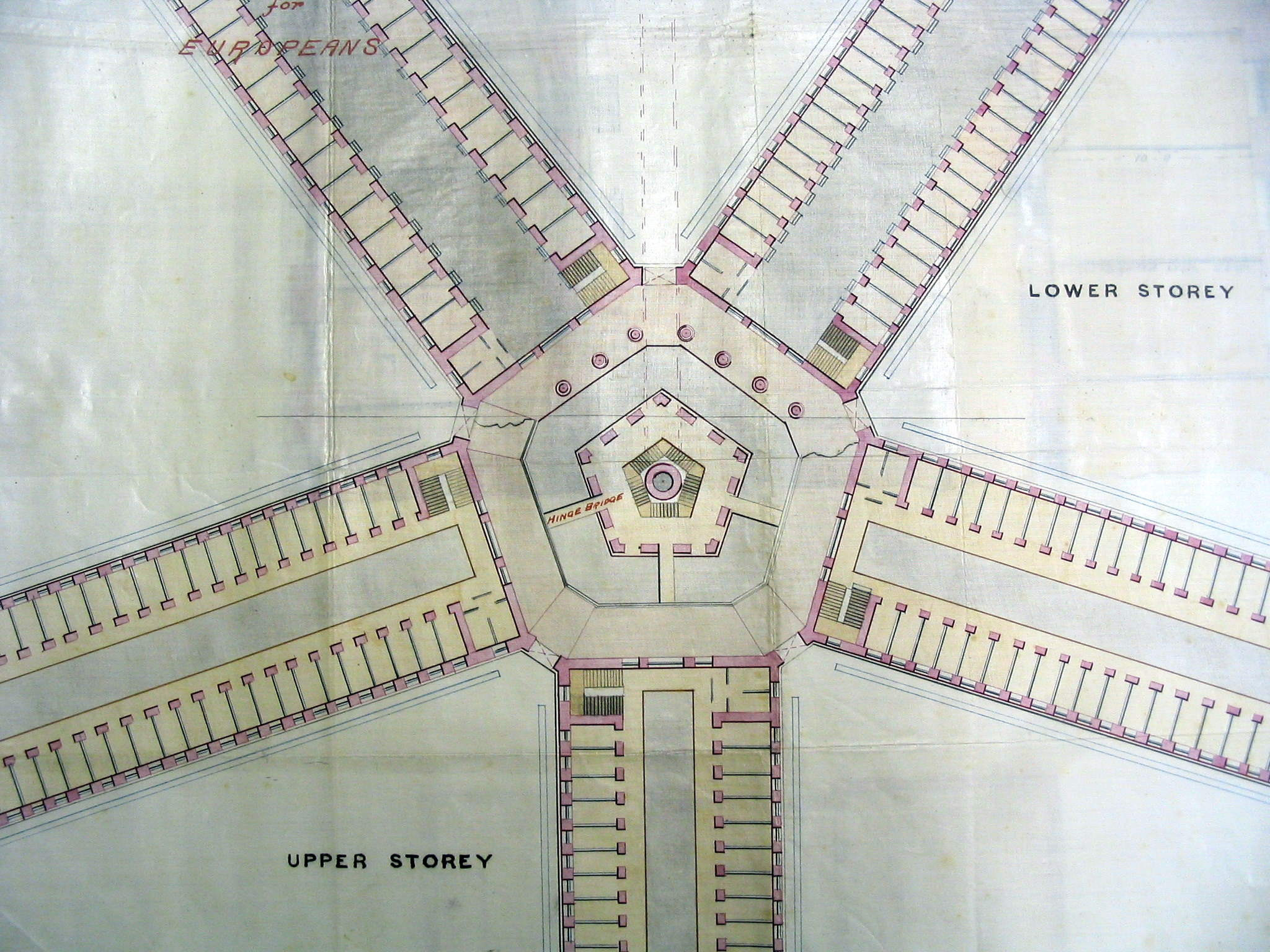
Original proposed plan of Outram Prison by McNair that was never built, circa 1880s.

When Outram Prison was built between 1879 and 1882 at the Civil Jail site by J. F. A. McNair, they adopted a more cellular concept that included stricter control of the prison perimeter. Outram Prison was also built using convict labour from Bras Basah Jail.

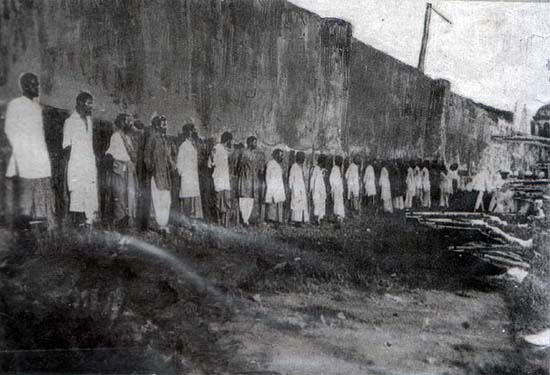
The public executions of the convicted sepoys at Outram Prison, circa March 1915

After the 1915 Singapore Mutiny, 47 sepoys were publicly executed by firing squad at Outram Prison while others were sentenced to imprisonment for up to 20 years. The executions were witnessed by an estimated 15,000 people.

In the 1930s, Outram Prison suffered from overcrowding and was considered a hazard. The prison was designed to hold up to 1,080 prisoners but, in the 1920s, gained an average daily number of convicts of 1,043 and had reached up to 1,311 by 1931. This led to plans for a new prison to be built at Changi.

After the construction of Changi Prison, Outram Prison was used to hold convicts serving short sentences whilst Changi Prison was used for longer sentences.

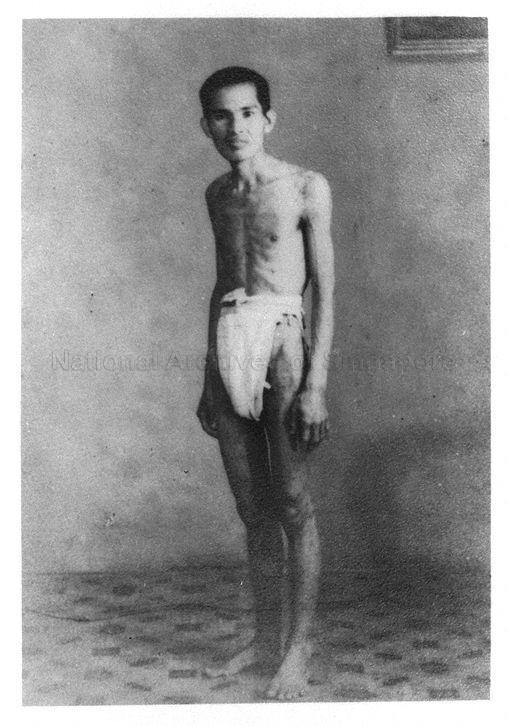
A prisoner after his release from the Japanese occupied Outram Prison, circa 1945.

During the Japanese occupation of Singapore, Outram Prison was known as Outram Road Gaol and was controlled by the Japanese and used to hold prisoners of war. 1,470 prisoners died of starvation, torture, and diseases while only 400 survived by 1945. As a result, 44 Japanese officers were convicted of war crimes committed at Outram Prison with 3 generals executed. The prison was handed back to the British following the end of the occupation.

In 1952, a new block for female convicts was made, replacing the block for European convicts. In 1954, a new block for remanding convicts was made. In 1956, a centre for reforming youths was opened at Outram Prison, replacing the remanding block.

== Demolition ==
In 1963, then-Prime Minister Lee Kuan Yew announced plans to demolish Outram Prison and replace it with a Housing and Development Board (HDB) estate. Convicts from Outram Prison were transferred to Changi Prison and Bedok Reformation Centre.

Outram Prison was replaced by Queenstown Remand Prison in 1966, which cost S$2 million to build. In 1966, works began to build 1,000 housing units and 400 shops. In 1970, public housing and a shopping complex called Outram Park Complex were built.

== See also ==
- Changi Prison
