= Freddy Bloom =

Journalist (1914–2000)

Elfrieden Bloom OBE (nee Wenzel; 6 February 1914 – 20 May 2000) was a journalist, author and campaigner for the rights of deaf children.

== Biography ==
Her parents were Robert and Emmy Wenzel, who were a German diplomat and a journalist. Growing up in New York, she graduated from Columbia University and subsequently studied at Trinity College, Dublin.

Her two marriages were both to medical officers of the British Army. Her first husband died of pleurisy shortly after arriving in Malaya near the beginning of World War II. Days after her second marriage, to Philip Bloom, they were incarcerated as prisoners of war after the Japanese capture of Singapore, and suffered terrible conditions in captivity until their release at the war's end in 1945.

Bloom's first daughter Virginia was born profoundly deaf, and Bloom devoted herself to overcoming the challenges of deafness for her daughter and for other deaf children. She became chair of the National Deaf Children's Society in which role she served until 1965, and remained a vice-president for the rest of her life.

== Career ==
Freddy Bloom (née Wenzel) was a pioneering journalist and tireless advocate for the rights of deaf children. Born in New York City in 1914, she graduated from Barnard College at Columbia University and later studied at Trinity College, Dublin. During World War II, she and her second husband, Philip Bloom, were interned in Japanese prison camps following the fall of Singapore. While in captivity, she helped maintain morale among fellow prisoners by editing a clandestine camp newsletter, Pow Wow. After their release in 1945, the Blooms settled in London. In 1958, Freddy Bloom was featured on the British television program This Is Your Life, where her contributions to the welfare of deaf children were highlighted. Her personal experience as the mother of a profoundly deaf daughter, Virginia, deeply shaped her advocacy. Determined to provide her daughter with the best possible opportunities, Bloom became actively involved in supporting other deaf children. She played a pivotal role in the establishment of the National Deaf Children’s Society (NDCS), serving as its chair from 1958 to 1965, and as vice-president thereafter. Under her leadership, the NDCS expanded its reach and influence, offering vital support and resources to families and children affected by deafness. Bloom was also a prolific writer, authoring several influential works on deafness and child development. Her book Our Deaf Children (1963) emphasized the importance of early communication and understanding in raising deaf children. Additionally, she edited the NDCS magazine TALK from 1956 to 1983, significantly increasing its circulation and impact during her tenure. In recognition of her tireless advocacy and contributions to the deaf community, Freddy Bloom was appointed an Officer of the Order of the British Empire (OBE) in 1966.

== Sources ==
- Frankel, William (21 July 2000). "Freddy Bloom War camp survivor who changed the way we think about the deaf". The Guardian.
