= Jim Milner =

English footballer

Personal information
- Full name: James Edward Milner
- Date of birth: 3 February 1933
- Place of birth: Newcastle upon Tyne, England
- Date of death: 24 October 2017 (aged 84)
- Place of death: Telford, England
- Height: 5 ft 8 in (1.73 m)
- Position: Inside forward

Senior career*
Years	Team	Apps	(Gls)
19??–1952	Blyth Spartans		
1952–1957	Burnley	1	(0)
1957–1961	Darlington	149	(27)
1961–1962	Accrington Stanley	0	(0)
1962–1963	Tranmere Rovers	16	(3)
1963–1965	Sankey's of Wellington		
1965–196?	New Brighton		
- * Club domestic league appearances and goals

James Edward Milner (3 February 1933 – 24 October 2017) was an English professional footballer who played as an inside forward. He scored 30 goals from 166 appearances in the Football League playing for Burnley, Darlington and Tranmere Rovers, and a further 5 goals from 22 appearances for Accrington Stanley which were expunged from the player's record when the club resigned from the League mid-season. He also played non-league football for Blyth Spartans, Sankey's of Wellington and New Brighton.

Outside football, Milner worked as a mining engineer.
