= Pearl's Hill =

Small hill in downtown Singapore

- Location within Singapore

Highest point
- Elevation: 147.638 feet (45.000 m)
- Coordinates: 1°17′04″N 103°50′21″E

Geography
- Location: Singapore

Geology
- Mountain type: hill

Pearl's Hill, briefly Mount Stamford, is a small hill in Singapore. Located in the vicinity of Chinatown, it is one of the few surviving hills in the city area.

== History ==
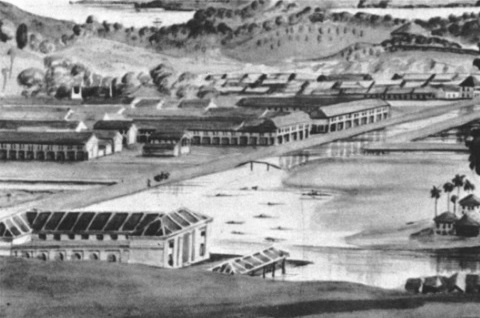
View of Singapore Town from Pearl's Hill circa 1845

The hill was the location of gambier plantations owned by the Chinese who had occupied and settled there before Stamford Raffles' arrival in 1819. Captain James Pearl, the captain of ship Indiana which took Sir Stamford Raffles to Singapore in 1819, liked the look of the hill, and began acquiring plot after plot on the hill from the Chinese gambier planters until he owned the entire hill in May 1822. Pearl had the Chinese and Malay workmen built his house on top of the hill and cleared the slopes to plant pepper vines for him.

The hill was briefly named Mount Stamford by Pearl as a compliment to Raffles. When Raffles, having returned from Bencoolen, Sumatra in October 1822, heard how the hill had been acquired without his approval, he ordered its repossession by the British Government. Raffles immediately relented and accorded the ownership of the hill back to Pearl. Captain Pearl, disgruntled by Raffles' actions, renamed the hill after himself.

In 1828, Captain Pearl retired back to England and his agents had the hill sold to the British Government for Rs 10,000. His name had remained associated with the hill since then.

An eastern foot of Pearl's Hill was well known for once being the site of the former multiple notable institutional buildings such as the Chinese Pauper Hospital (present day Tan Tock Seng Hospital) and Seaman's hospital, both designed and built by John Turnbull Thomson from 1844 to 1846.

Pearl's Hill Prison was once built in 1847 by Charles Edward Faber on the western slope of the hill based on plans by Thomson. It was built there because of the close proximity to Sepoy Lines as it was thought to provide protection and security for the prison. The prison had since demolished in 1968.

Pearl's Hill used to be higher than Fort Canning Hill, thus in 1861 the British colonial engineers decided to have the coolies shave off the top of Pearl's Hill, therefore lowering its peak to ensure their enemies would not be able to use the hill as an attacking position against the newly built Fort Canning.

== See also ==
- Pearl's Hill City Park, a city park of 9 hectares built around a reservoir on top of Pearl's Hill Terrace.
- Pearl Bank Apartments
- Pearl's Hill Service Reservoir
