= Francis Murray (physician) =

Army physician

Francis (Frank) Joseph Murray (1912–1993) was a medical doctor from Belfast who served in the Royal Army Medical Corps during the Second World War and was imprisoned by the Imperial Japanese Army after the Fall of Singapore.

== Biography ==
Frank Murray was born above his father's shop on the Oldpark Road in Belfast. He attended the Jaffe School on the Cliftonville Road for a short period before moving to St Patrick's Christian Brothers Primary School on Donegall Street. Then he attended St Mary's Christian Brothers Grammar School in Barrack Street before proceeding to Queen's University Belfast from which he graduated with a medical degree in 1937.

He practiced as a general practitioner in Birmingham until the outbreak of the Second World War when he enlisted in the Royal Army Medical Corps. He served in India and then in British Malaya. When Singapore surrendered to the Japanese he was interned in a POW camp at Changi Prison. He was later transferred to other camps in Japan.

While imprisoned he maintained correspondence with his future wife Eileen O'Kane whom he had met while both were learning the Irish language in the Donegal Gaeltacht. To prevent his letters from being read by the Japanese guards, he wrote in Irish. In his diary he recorded the executions which occurred when he was imprisoned in the Selarang Barracks.

On discharge from the army in 1946, he was awarded the MBE in recognition of his service during the war. In 1995, after his death, his wife Eileen and his son Carl received the award in a private audience with Queen Elizabeth The Queen Mother, at Clarence House, London.

After the war, he returned to Belfast and married Eileen O'Kane. Frank is the father of planetary scientist Carl Murray. He continued to practice as a general practitioner until his retirement. He died in 1993.

== Legacy ==
In 2022, an Irish language documentary film was made by BBC Gaeilge about his wartime correspondence; a shortened version of the documentary was shown on TG4. A dedicated website has been developed by his son Carl which gives details of his father's life and includes documents from his wartime experiences. His son Paul has also written a book about his father.
