= Ron Kitchenn =

British electrical engineer

Ronald Graley Kitchenn
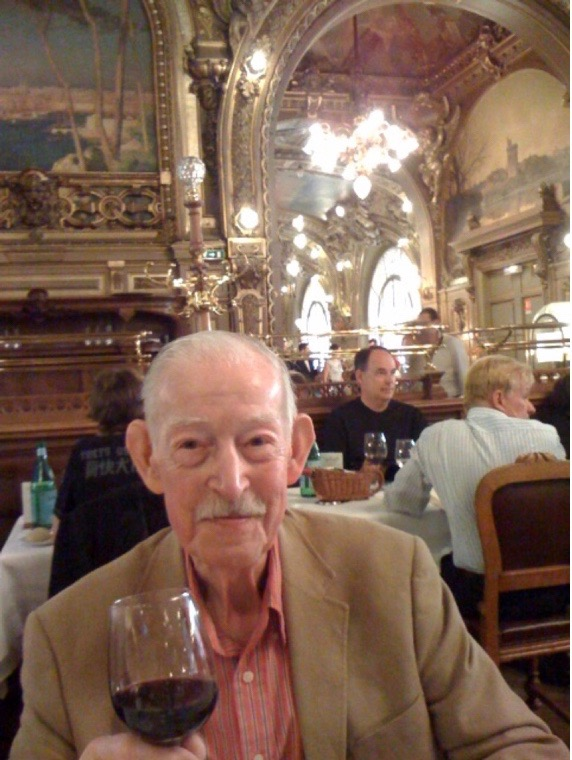
- Ron Kitchenn at Le Train Bleu restaurant in Gare de Lyon railway station in Paris, 2008
- Born: 17 March 1920; Letchworth, Hertfordshire, England
- Died: 5 November 2010 (aged 90); Melbourne, Australia
- Burial place: Nil, donated body for study
- Education: London University
- Occupation: Telecommunications Engineer
- Partner(s): Nora Beryl (Beryl), nee Cavey, 6 May 1920 - 23 September 2017
- Children: Ian & Guy
- Parent(s): Wilfred, Elsie

Ron Kitchenn (17 March 1920 – 5 November 2010) was a British electrical engineer.

== Background ==
Kitchenn was born in England. His father, who hailed from Chesterfield, was a violinist and music teacher. He attended Pixmore County Council School and then Letchworth Grammar School, now known as Fearnhill School. He joined the General Post Office at 16. While working he studied part-time for an Engineering degree.

Kitchenn and his wife, Beryl, migrated to Australia in 1951 where he joined the Postmaster-General's Department. Kitchenn became heavily involved in community groups, was a significant force in Rostrum and worked on international standards for telecommunications.

== Telecommunications ==
Kitchenn joined the British Post Office (BPO) at 16 as a Youth-in-Training in 1936. While working, he studied part-time for a BSc (Engineering) degree, from London University completing it in 1948 . He initially continued with the British Post Office, where he worked in all areas of communications including seven years in the Engineer-in-Chief's Office, in the Telegraphs, Trainer in Transmission systems and in Local Lines and Broadcasting Branches. As an Executive Engineering Broadcasting, he was awarded the British Institution of Radio Engineers (NIRE) (now the Institution of Electronic and Radio Engineers) "the most outstanding paper in the field of broadcasting" in 1951.

Kitchenn was recruited by the Australian Post Master General's (PMG) Department which was also known as the Australian Post Office (APO) in February 1951. The British Post Office offered a generous parachute clause to engineering recruits to Australia: if the new position in Australia was not satisfactory, recruits could return to BPO's employment without penalty within three years.

While still in London he was asked to work at Australia House to devise and administer tests and interviews to recruit technician and cable-jointer staff. Feeling interviews were inadequate and without the means to perform practical tests, Kitchenn decided on a set of manual dexterity tests supported by acknowledged authorities.

Kitchenn came to Australia in September 1951 starting work in Sydney, New South Wales. He was a senior professional engineer in the PMG's Department, continuing in it after it became a quasi government organisation name Telecom Australia.

Doug Brooke, formerly Supervising Engineer, Transmission & Line Planning, Telecom Australia in the 1970s, wrote: "Ron was in charge of one of the three divisions, with the responsibility for the formulation of operational parameters for telephonic speech transmission to ensure that end-to-end telephone communication meets intelligibility and grade of service standards irrespective of whether it is a local, national or international call. This feature is vital for all telephone conversations – the lifeblood of industry, commerce, and the community generally."

The subsequent adoption internationally of most of the results of this work by the Geneva-based International Telecommunication Union (ITU) – an organ of the United Nations (UN) was largely due to Kitchenn's professionalism, tenacity, drive and attention to detail over many years.

Kitchenn was an organiser and participant in the first international seminar on national transmission planning for the ITU, held in Melbourne in 1970. He was also a CCITT Special Rapporteur for studies on transmission characteristics of circuits in the switched international network and on stability and echo. He was also:

- Postal Electrical Society of Victoria – secretary 1958
- Secretary, Telecommunications Society of Australia
- Organiser and participant in the ITU first international conference on national transmission planning – Melbourne
- UNESCO regional seminar, Kuala Lumpur – Training of communications planners, 1974 – Australian representative
- Australian delegate to CCITT study group meetings, and co-author of the ITU Handbook on planning of national telephone networks and Vice Chairman.of its 7Study Group XVI, dealing with transmission planning of national and international telephone networks, 1977–1980

Kitchenn retired from Telecom Australia in mid-1982 aged 62 years.

=== Telecommunication Society of Australia ===
Upon becoming secretary of the Postal Electrical Society of Victoria in 1958 it became apparent that the Telecommunications Journal of Australia, although of national standing, was in decline and had no formal ties to other states. The PMG-sponsored Victorian Society was the dominant professional force in telecommunications in Australia as a result of the Australian federation initially using Melbourne as its capital city and sighting of government departments including the PMG in Melbourne. Kitchenn was a driving force behind the transformation of the Postal Electrical Society of Victoria into the national Telecommunications Society of Australia.

Kitchenn became the society's general secretary from 1960 to 1972. His duties included overseeing the publication of the Telecommunications Journal of Australia. Under his guidance the journal was modernised and within two years its circulation almost trebled. A few years later a new journal, Australian Telecommunication Research, was launched to publish the society's more academic papers. A technically accurate poem THE LOSS ACROSS A HYBRID was written by Kitchenn and published in the Telecommunications Journal of Australia in 1977 and repeated in 2011.

He also published the following articles in the Journal:

- the 2-Wire /4-Wire Inter-Exchange Telephone Circuit, Vol 22 No. 2, 1972;
- the First Faraday Lectures, Vol 24 No. 1, 1974;
- Trans Hybrid Loss, an Approximation and its Errors, Vol 27 No. 1, 1977, this article was accompanied by Kitchenn's technically correct poem, The Loss Across the Hybrid.

== Community ==
Kitchenn was an active participant in the community through his children's schools, educational organisations, public speaking organisations and bush walking.

He was a member of the following organisations:

- State Schools Committees and Councils Association of Victoria (SSCCAV): executive member April 1962, vice president April 1962
- Victorian Council of State Schools (VCSS (formerly SSCCAV)) – president 1968 to 1971
- Editor of the School Bell magazine – 1964/5 to 1967/8
- Council of State School Organisations – president 1968 to 1971
- UNESCO National Education Committee, Canberra – member 1973 to 1975
- Rostrum, Club 23 member, 1958 -2010; Club 48 Preston member 1977 to 2010, Victorian State President 1979 to 1981 & 1985. National, Australian Rostrum Council President 1982 to 1984
- ABC 3ZZ, member of the planning committee as a Rostrum representative 1975.
- Citizens Advice Bureau (CAB), member of management committee after 1982
- Footscray Institute of Technology, visiting lecturer, effective communications, 1987 to 1997

Kitchenn joined his children's school councils starting in 1958. He was invited to join the state-based support organisations. This was initially the State Schools Committees and Councils Association of Victoria which became Victorian Council of State Schools. He became the president of the VCSS in its first year and remained as president for three years. He was invited to become a member of UNESCO National Education Committee 1973 to 1975 in Canberra, a part-time role.

Kitchenn was a member of Superannuated Commonwealth Officers Association (SCOA), Victorian Division, and retired from the secretary's position in 2008,

After retirement Kitchenn joined the Greensborough CAB, completed the 3-day training course and started staffing the drop-in centre half a day a week; he was quickly recruited to board of management.

== Public speaking ==
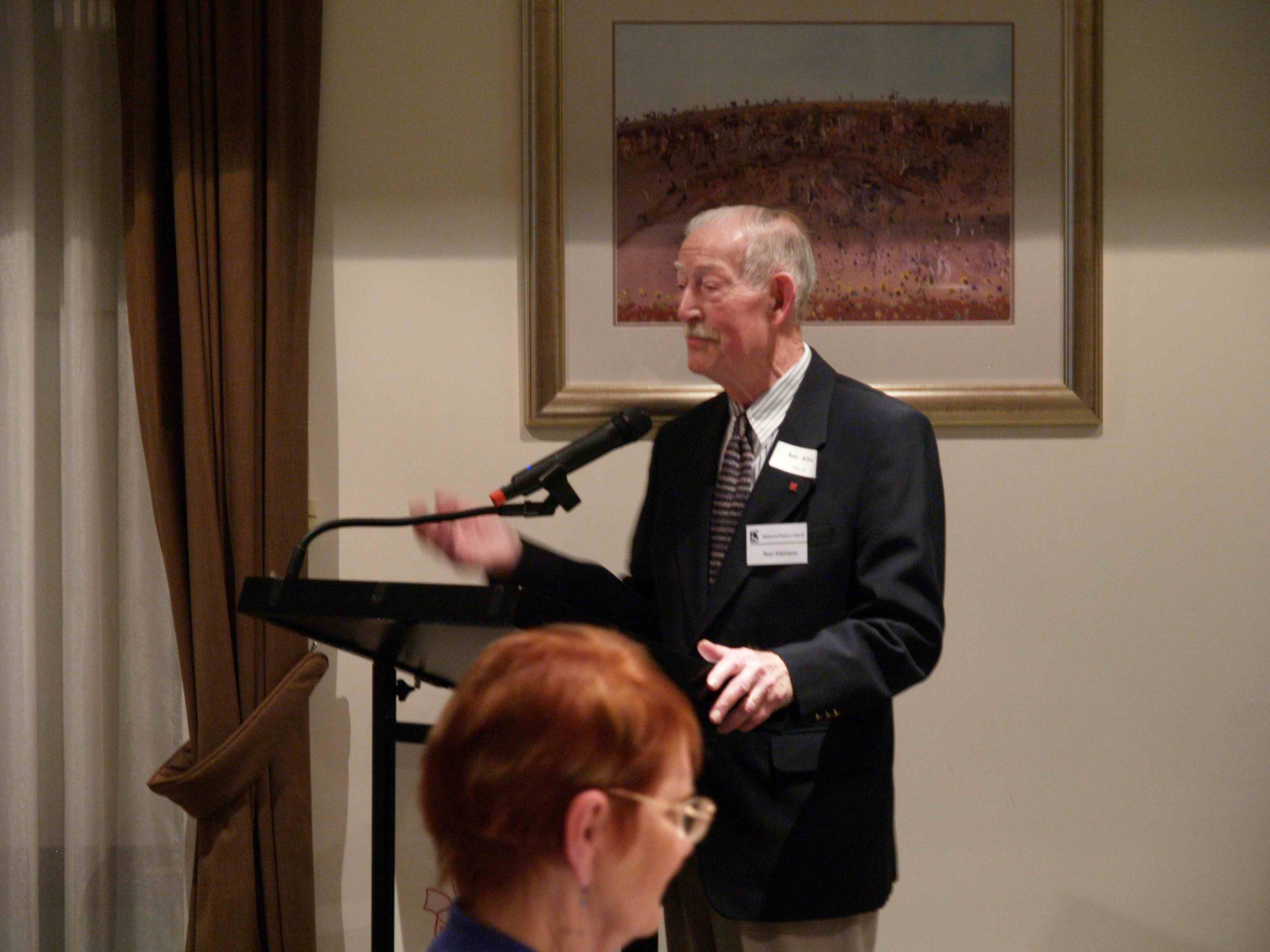
Ron Kitchenn Speaking at Rostrum Club 23's 50th Anniversary Dinner in 2008. Kitchenn was one of the founding members.

Kitchenn was an inaugural member of two Rostrum Clubs: Club 23 Melbourne formed in 1958 as a lunch time club where he was a member for over 50 years; Club 48 Preston formed in 1977 as an evening club. He was appointed a Life Member of both. He was elevated to the level of Rostrum Freeman on 24 July 1971. Freemanship is awarded in recognition of a high level and long standing service to Rostrum and the community. The concept of Freemanship was introduced at the first Rostrum club in Manchester by Sidney F Wicks.

His roles include President of Victorian Rostrum from 1979 to 1981 and again in 1985, Rostrum's National President 1981 to 1983. He also participated as a member of State Executive (Zone Council) over many years and was responsible for the creation of the Rostrum Office Bearers’ Manual . He was an club Critic, a competition adjudicator and a tutor at Critics courses.

He was an active assistant in the Rostrum Voice of Youth competition over many years with his last involvement being the year he died, 2010.

In 2008 the Australian Rostrum Council awarded the Rostrum Gold Medal to Kitchenn for his service to Rostrum and to the broader community. Rostrum's Victorian City Clubs have an annual speaking competitions named after Kitchenn. The Ron Kitchenn Trophy consists of 3 parts, a ten minutes speech, a 3-minute reading and a 3-minute short notice speech.

Kitchenn was also a member of the English Speaking Union.

== See also ==
- Telecommunications in Australia
- International Telecommunication Union
- Australian Rostrum
- Sidney F. Wicks
- AGH Rostrum Club at Changi
