= Sidney F. Wicks =

Sidney Frederic Wicks
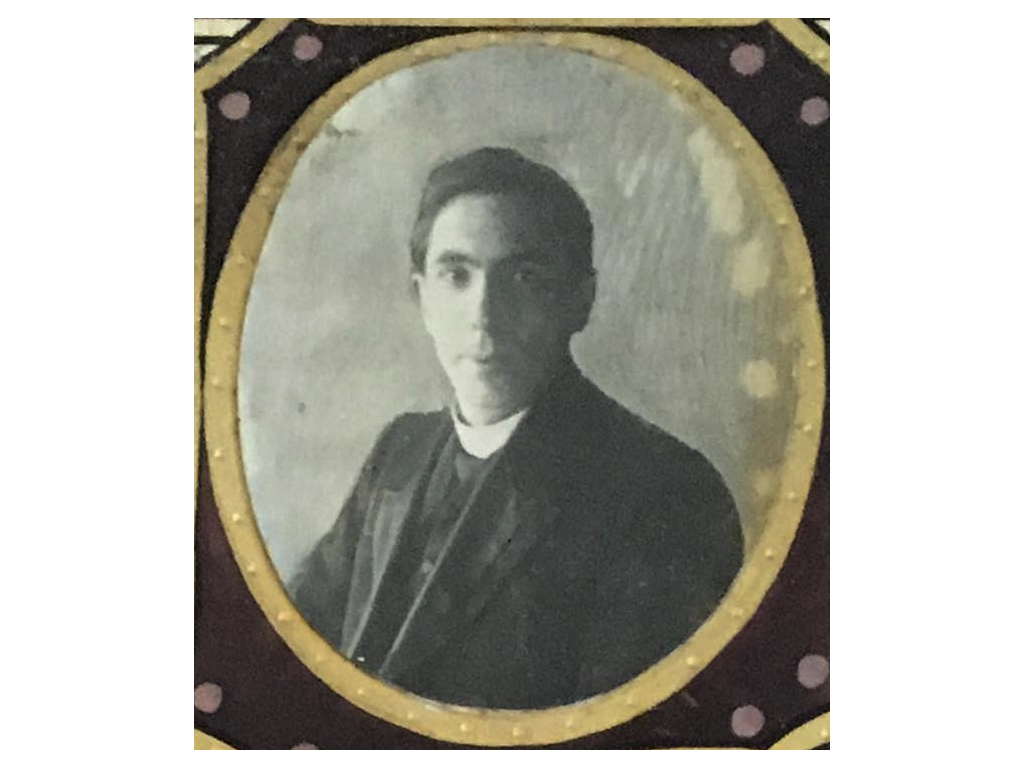
- Sidney F Wicks – Congregational Minister (1916)
- Born: 6 March 1882; Epsom, Surrey, England
- Died: 13 February 1956 (aged 73); Buxton, England
- Education: Hackney Academy; University of Liverpool
- Occupations: Congregational Minister, Advertising and Business Executive, Newspaper Executive
- Partner(s): Dorothy E Wicks, nee Whitfield
- Children: Cedric Whitfiled Wicks; David Whitfield Wicks; Merlin Whitfield Wicks; Herewood Whitfield Wicks
- Parent(s): William Wicks; Elizabeth Wicks formerly Wilkins

Sidney Frederick Wicks (6 March 1882 – 13 February 1956) was a Congregational minister, public speaking trainer, advertising and business manager, and newspaper executive. He conducted public speaking courses and formed what is now the oldest public speaking club in the world, initially called The Rostrum but now simply Rostrum.

== Biography ==
Wicks' father was a blacksmith who worked as farrier at Epsom Downs Racecourse. Wicks was educated at a village school and then became a clerk for a coal merchant. He attended Hackney Theological College, University of London, via correspondence lessons for the Congregational Ministry, and became a Minister at the small Robinson St Congregational Church, Hastings.

He later became the minister at the much larger Norwood Congregational Church, Liverpool, where he also studied for a Diploma of Social Science at Liverpool University. He left the ministry as a result of his experience in the First World War.

In June 1914 Wicks married Dorothy E. Whitfield at Newcastle. Their first son, David Whitfield Wicks, was born at West Derby in September 1915. Followed by Cedric Whitfield Wicks, born at Leicester in June 1918, a third son, Merlin Whitfield Wicks, was born at Chorlton June 1922. Their fourth son, Hereward Whitfield Wicks, was born at South Hylton in August 1924 but died at the age of 20 months, on 30 May 1926.

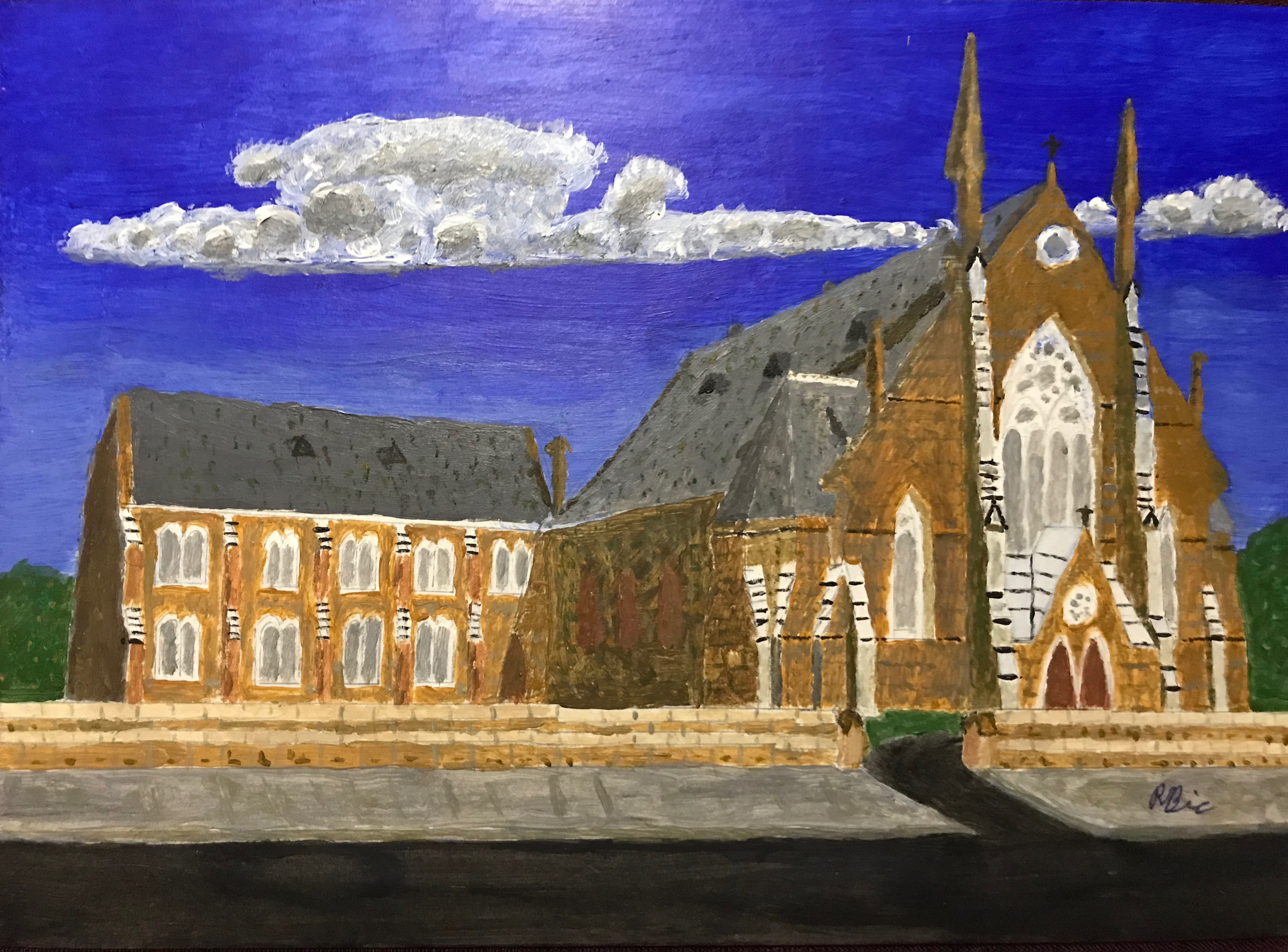
Norwood Congregational Church, Liverpool

After retirement, Wicks entered the Catholic Church in 1942. He joined the Third Order of the Catholic Church in 1946.

== War years ==
During the war Wicks was attached to the Fifth Army (United Kingdom) as a YMCA worker and Padre. While in a shell hole in France, he made up his mind to quit the ministry. He was injured and invalided back to England. On his return he took up the role of educational officer for YMCA at the Shoreham Army Camp, traveling to London and the Welsh border.

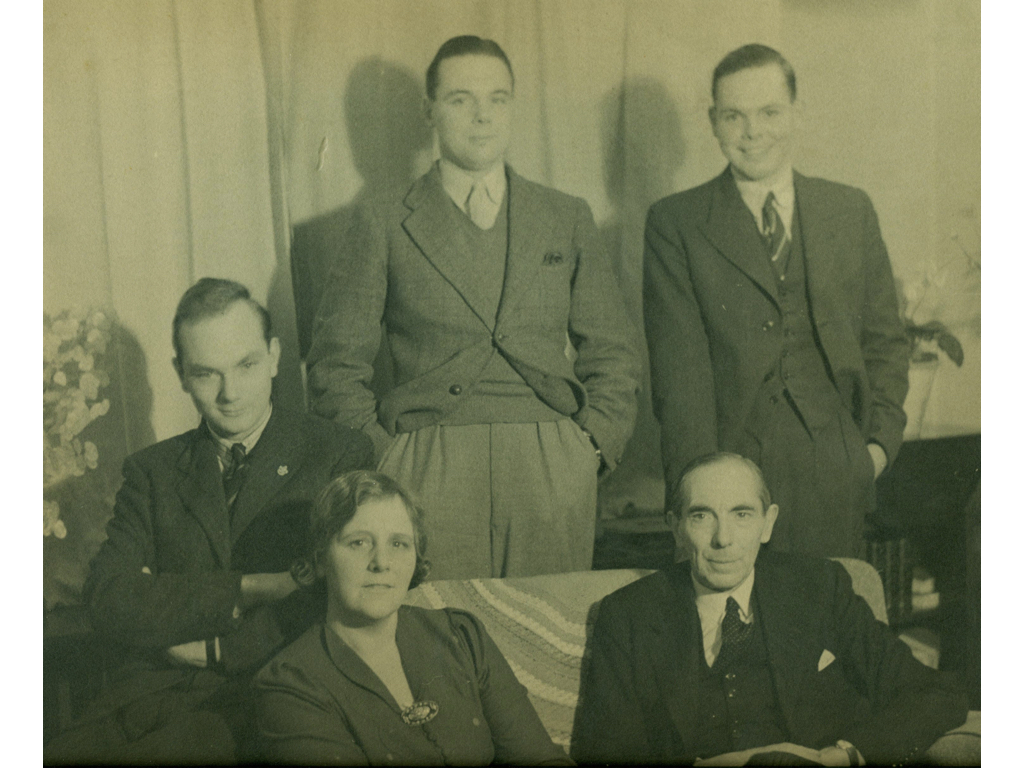
Sidney F Wicks, Dorothy his wife and sons, left to right Cedric, David and Merlin 1930s

== Work and business ==
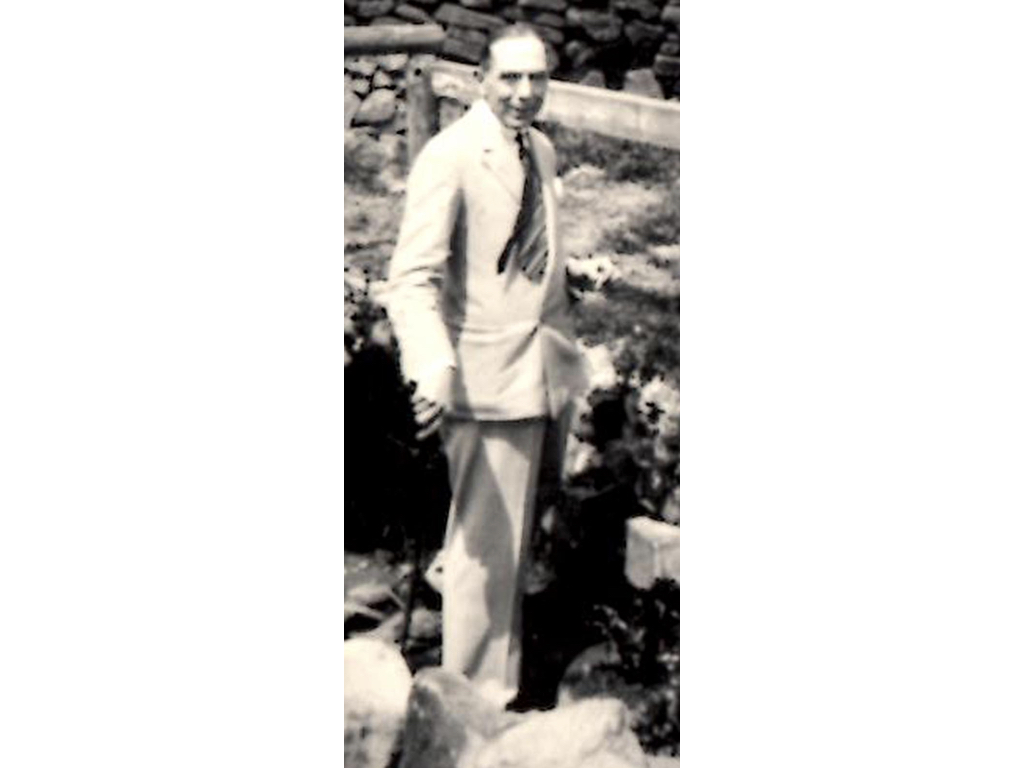
Sidney F Wicks 1934.

Wicks joined the advertising department of The Manchester Guardian in 1923. In 1924 he took several months leave of absence for a lecture tour of American universities. He left The Guardian in 1925 to become joint managing director of Cross-Courtney Limited, advertising agents, business advisers and printers in Manchester.

He also founded his own firm, Sidney F. Wicks Ltd, which provided advertising and business consultancy. This firm was taken over by his son David after his death.

In 1932, Wicks was the Manchester business manager for the First International Summer School of Dance in Buxton.

As editor in chief and chairman of directors of the Manchester Weekly News Limited, he was instrumental in taking over the Manchester City News.

== Publications ==
- "The Legion of Splendid Women" in The Girl’s Own Paper and Woman’s Magazine
- Public Speaking for Business Men, 1924, Methuen & Co, London, 2nd ed. 1925, 3rd ed. 1933
- Public Speaking Do’s & Don’ts, 1926, Frederick A Stokes Company, New York
- Stories for Speeches – How to Prepare and Use Them, 1937, Frederick Muller Ltd, London
- Public Speaking for Women, 1937, Frederick Muller Ltd, London
- Sunwise, 1937, Frederick Muller Ltd, London
- The Friends of St. Francis, 1952, Franciscan Herald Press, Chicago, Illinois

== His communities ==
Wicks lived in many places in the UK. Being born in Surrey, he may have lived for a time in Hackney as a student. He lived in Hastings and Liverpool as a minister, Shoreham and France with the YMCA and the army, Manchester for business. In his forties, due to ill health his doctor advised that he move to the country side away from the Manchester smog. He moved to the rural Borough of Buxton, about an hour's train journey from Manchester.

He worked with community organisations in and around both Manchester and Buxton. Examples are the YMCA, providing public speaking courses, the Soroptimist Club and was chairman of the Manchester Publicity Association, participating in debates at the Athenaeum Debating Society, and delivering speeches for the Practical Psychology Club of Manchester

During 1928 Wicks unsuccessfully stood as the Liberal Candidate for Manchester City Council in the Chorlton-cum-Hardy ward. In 1929 he was elected to the Buxton Borough Council representing the Rate Payers' Association. He remained a Buxton Councillor for one term.

Wicks was at times a newspaper correspondent writing articles such as the "Future of Greek", and "Closing Churches". He also wrote letters to the editor on a number of topics;

In 1947 Sidney was appointed to the Dovedale Committee of the National Trust.

He lived in Buxton until the death of his wife in 1954 after which he moved for a short time to Alvescot, Oxfordshire.

== Public speaking ==
Sidney provided public lectures on such things as "The American and The English Business Man", "The United States of Great Britain and America", "The King's English in Business", and "Sincerity in Publicity". He also participated in debates at the YMCA on such topics as "Esperanto", and "That Democracy is a Failure".

He ran Public Speaking courses initially for Pelman Institute and then later for the Manchester YMCA. The YMCA initially commissioned Sidney to provide 10 sessions of "Business Man's Class for Public Speaking". This was so successful the class members wished to continue and the YMCA commissioned another 10 sessions for a new class. Sidney, already committed to a second series of 10 sessions for beginners on Fridays, continued with an advanced course on Wednesday nights where he would act as teacher and critic.

In 1924 Wicks embarked on a lecture tour of American Universities in 17 states. The range of topics was broad and ranged from the address at Cornell University on "The Labor Party and the Labor Government in England" to one in Pennsylvania on Shakespeare and modern language.

=== The Rostrum ===
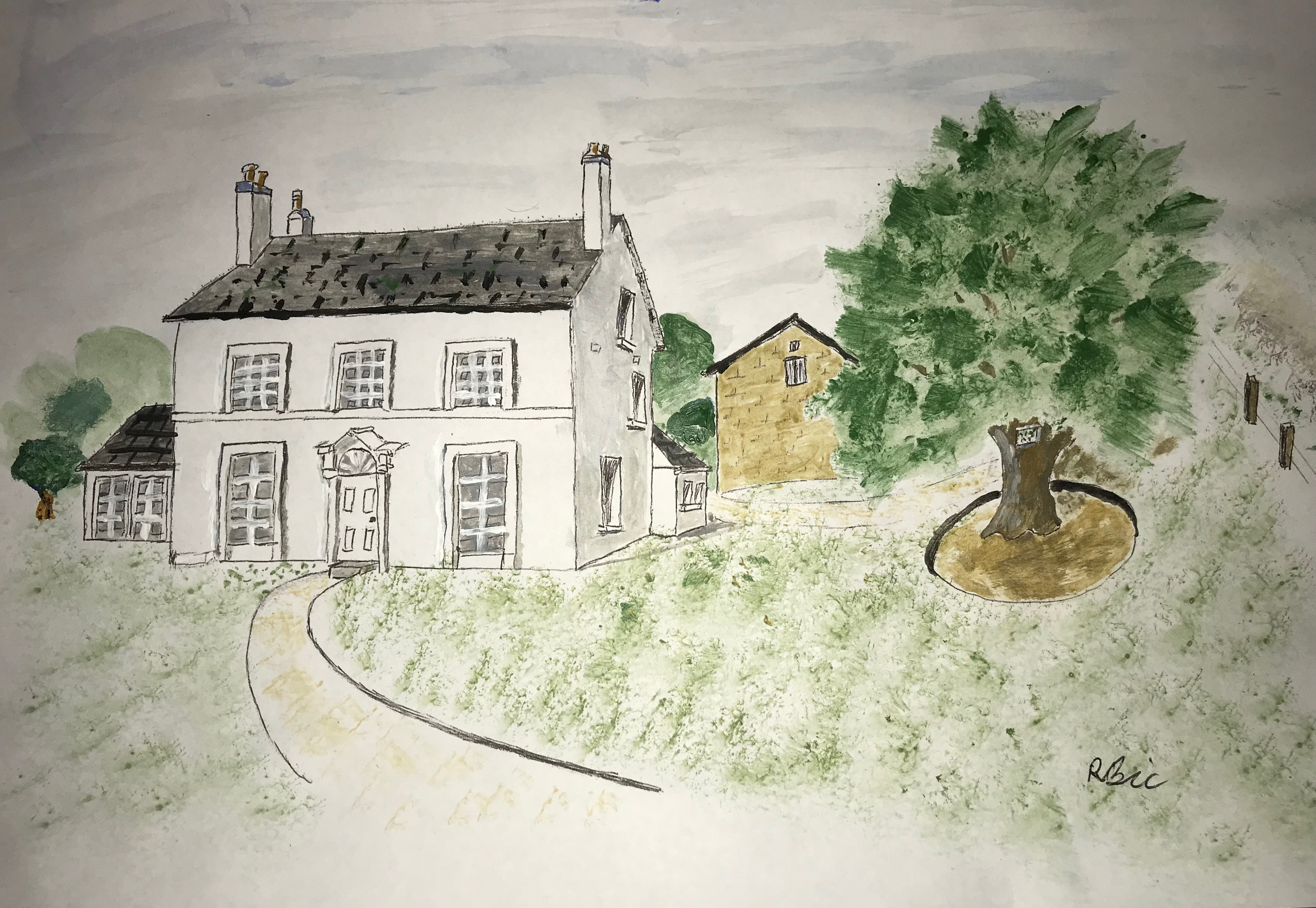
Greendale Farm Mottram St Andrew, Yew Tree under which The Rostrum Club was Founded. Note the plaque

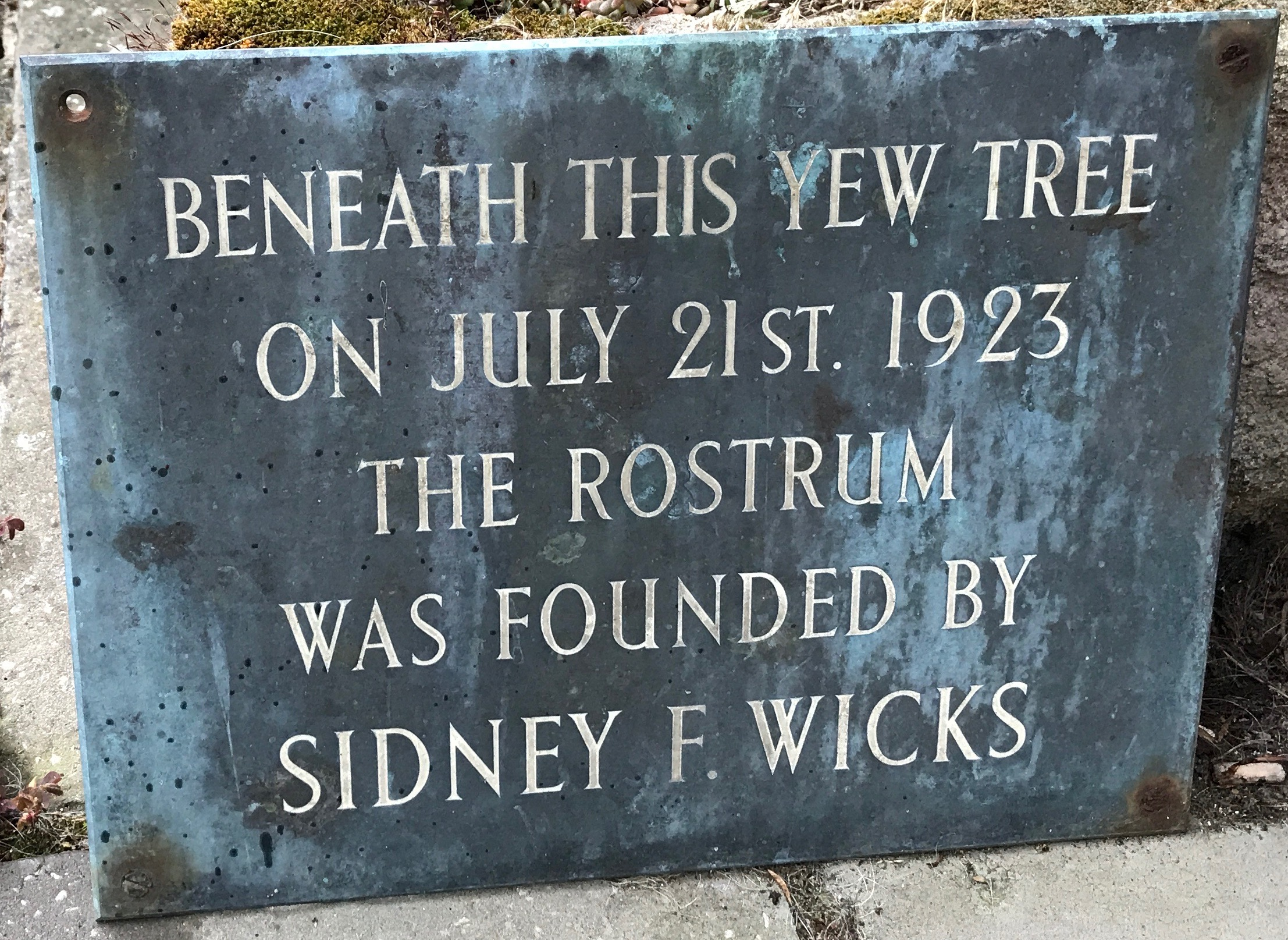
Greendale Farm, Mottram St Andrew, Yew Tree under which The Rostrum Club was Founded, Plaque donated by David Whitfield-Wicks 1959

"The Rostrum" was formed as a result of attendee of the advanced course, Douglas Wallwork, organising a 4.2 mile (6.7 km) walk for course participants from Wilmslow to a Tea Room at Greendale Farm, Mottram St Andrew on 21 July 1923. In there discussions under the yew tree a club called The Rostrum was formed. Under this Yew tree with Sidney F Wicks' guidance the purpose and scope of the club, the Rostrum Promise and the roles of the club key figures in the club were set. Sidney was the recognised founder.

They set The Rostrum objects as:

- The Rostrum is for those who desire to improve themselves in public speaking, and who hold freedom of speech, loyalty to truth, clarity of thought and a love of the English language are of the utmost value to the community.
- The Rostrum aims to enrich the fellowship of its members; it holds to an educational ideal.

The Rostrum allocated roles as follows:

- Speaker of the Last Word (who should be a recognised teacher or exponent of the art of public speaking) – to give guidance and instruction in matters essential to the art, and to give constructive criticism at the close of each session. This officer is now called a Coach
- Chief Guardian of Order – to interpret and guard the Constitution, to adjudicate on questions of law and order, to preside on special occasions or to appoint a Guardian of Order to preside on other occasions. This officer is now known as the club president.
- Scribe – to act as secretary to the Speaker of the Last Word and to conduct correspondence with outside bodies. This officer is now known as the club secretary.
- Recorder – to carry out all internal secretarial work, to keep the minutes of the committee, to record the activities of the club, and to convene meetings. This officer is now known as the secretary. The roles of scribe and recorder are now combined.
- Purse Holder – to collect members’ subscriptions, to be responsible for club moneys, and to pay such amounts as were authorised by the committee. This officer is now known as the club treasurer.
- Pathfinder – to arrange and lead all Rostrum outings and to organise social functions.
- Committee of the Round Table – this was the name of the committee, and members were known as ‘Speakers of the Round Table’. These officers are now known as the club committee.
- Pioneers of the Rostrum – All foundation members of The Rostrum, in 1923

Due to Sidney's declining health and move to Buxton, after 1929 he mainly just attended The Rostrum club meetings on one night per year, Founder's Night, and he joined in an annual walk to Greendale Farm and the Yew tree on the closest Saturday to 21 July each year.

With Sidney's encouragement a visiting Australian engineer, Alan Crook, who was a club member between 1924 and 26, on his return to Australia he started a Rostrum club on 21 July 1930. The first meeting of this club was under an Angophora tree in Sydney at Middle Harbour with the same Objective as The Rostrum club. Numbers quickly grew through the Australian States and a national body called the Australian Rostrum Council was formed. There was ongoing association between the Australians and both The Rostrum club in Manchester and Sidney F Wicks.

During the Second World War, Australian Rostrum Club members sent food parcels to England for the Wicks family and for The Rostrum club members.

During the second World War, a Rostrum Club was formed in the Changi Prison, Prisoner of War camp. It was called A. G. H. Rostrum standing for Australian General Hospital and held its first meeting on 18 May 1943. The scant records of the club include agenda with topics such as "That tradition is a bar to progress", "Is an enduring peace possible?", "The importance of increased pleasure time", "Preservation of the Fauna of Australia" and "That women should participate in industry on an equal basis to me". The Minutes of the first meeting record that future meetings were to be held in the Men's, Sergeants' and Officers' Messes by rotation.

As part of a business trip, Alan Crook paid a return visit to Sidney F Wicks at Buxton and The Rostrum Club in Manchester in 1946.

In 1952, when tape recording was still uncommon, Sidney recorded a message on a reel to reel tape recorder for the Australian Rostrum clubs.

As The Rostrum Club grew, with time, it reached the upper limit of the club of 35 members. A second Rostrum Club, called Rostrum Number 2 Club, was opened in Manchester by Sidney F Wicks in 1953

Sidney's legacy is a Rostrum Club still operating in Manchester today called the Rochdale Rostrum Club and many Rostrum Clubs operating throughout Australia.

== Later life and death ==
After the death of his wife Dorothy in September 1954, Sidney moved to Still Cottage, Alvescot, Oxfordshire where he planned to grow a beautiful rose garden. Within the year his health failed and he moved to the Portland Nursing Home, Buxton, where he died on 13 February 1956.

== See also ==
- Australian Rostrum
- AGH Rostrum Club at Changi
- Ron Kitchenn
- Alan Crook
