= Changi University =

"Changi University" at Changi PoW Camp

Location
- Changi PoW Camp initially at Selerang barracks Malaya, Singapore
- Coordinates: 1°20′42″N 103°58′59.5″E

Information
- Established: 19 February 1942
- Founder: Harold Burfield Taylor
- Closed: 13 September 1945 (final PoWs evacuated)

Changi University is the nickname given to a program of education for prisoners of war in the Changi Prisoner of War camp in Singapore during World War II. The program's aims were to raise the morale of the prisoners of war and mitigate boredom.

== Background ==
After the capture of Singapore by the Japanese during World War II, all allied prisoners of war (PoWs) were sent to Changi Prison which for the PoWs included part of the adjacent military Selerang Barracks. Allied civilian prisoners, men, women and children were kept inside the Changi Prison, while the PoWs were kept in the surrounding barracks.

The 15 Feb 1942 surrender resulted in the imprisoning of over 45,000 allied prisoners of war, including approximately 15,000 Australian PoWs. Due to the large number of PoWs and interned civilian prisoners, there was a need to maintain morale and mitigate boredom.

An education program was initiated within 4 days of the allied capitulation. Within 3 weeks of the men becoming PoWs and moving to Changi as prisoners, Brigadier Harold Burfield Taylor of AIF Headquarters initiated an extensive range of education classes for the PoWs. The AIF Education Unit was unofficially dubbed the "Changi University" by PoWs and others. Taylor became known as the Chancellor. Captain Adrian Curlewis, a Barrister, was one of the key people who implement the program, became known Dean of Law.

A booklet from the War Office in London, "The Soldier's Welfare", had been issued in 1941 and sent to all unit welfare officers. It offered suggestions for sports and games, entertainment, and education. While the booklet was targeted at enlisted men on active service, its advice was particularly pertinent to PoWs. Changi PoWs began using sport, entertainment and the extensive education of "Changi University" organised with its well resourced library.

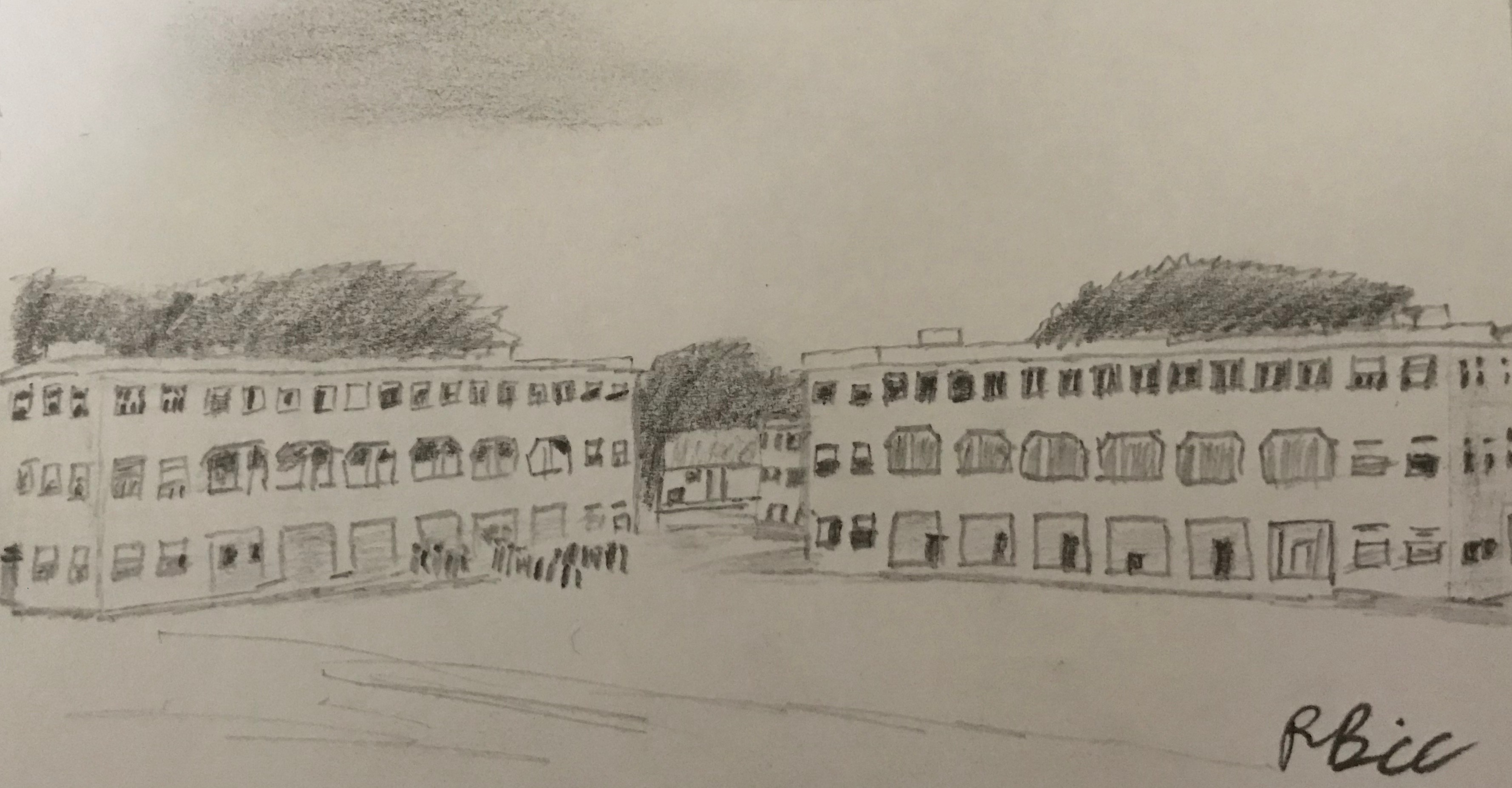
Seralang Barracks Changi, before WW2, designed for 600, housed thousands of PoWs.

== AIF Education Unit ==
The AIF Education unit was set up to provide education to and resources for the PoWs. It was open to all allied PoWs. The scant records that have survived show over 2,000 students at an early stage and 9,000 at its peak.

Although an integrated whole, the library and the "Changi University" course work will be dealt with separately below due to the different operations.

=== Changi library ===
Colonel 'Black' Jack Galleghan persuaded the Japanese commandant that it would be easier to manage the PoWs with his limited number of guards and poor perimeter facing if books were provided to keep them occupied. He advised where to get them. The Singapore library with its English books was of no use to the Japanese so trucks were provided and the volumes in this Library were delivered to the PoW camp. This was quickly followed by the valuable Raffles Hotel Library, which included many rare and valuable books, also books from regimental libraries and books that could be scavenged by PoW work parties around Singapore. The library took all books it could find and even had penny dreadfuls. Singapore had not had the strict book censorship of Australia, so there was a high demand for the many books now available that could not be obtained in Australia.

The library was called the AIF Education Centre and it was manned by about 8 dedicated men who slept with the stacks of books. These librarians included Alick Downer, a later politician and Australian High Commissioner in London, David Griffin, who became Lord Mayor of Sydney in 1972, and Tony Newsom.

The education unit initially had 2 typewriters, and additional books, paper, writing material scavenged by the men who went out on working parties in and around Singapore for the Japanese.

The library continued until liberation.

==== The Happiness Box ====
David Griffin, wrote a children's book, The Happiness Box, for the civilian children incarcerated in the main Changi Prison. The book, was typed up by Bruce Blakey, illustrated by Leslie Greener and bound within 48 hours in the AIF Education Unit. The Japanese objected to the naming of one of the characters, Winston, and ordered its destruction. The book was whisked away and hidden with other documents in an ammunition box buried in the PoW camp grounds. The Happiness Box was first published in 1947, reprinted in 1991 and it has been dramatised by the ABC. The original copy now resides in the Mitchell Library, State Library of New South Wales.

=== Classes ===
The first classes started on 11 March 1942 with a solid education program already developed. The AIF consisted of officers and men with a broad range of skills and qualifications. There were those with high academic and business skills, trade skills and the poorly educated. Australia had been through the depression resulting in many of the men leaving school early to work, if they could get it.

The "Changi University" operated with seven faculties:

1. General Education,
2. Business Training,
3. Languages,
4. Engineering,
5. Science,
6. Agriculture,
7. Law and Medicine.

In the Southern Area College, located in Kitchener Barracks, the tuition approximated university level.

The 18th Division College focussed on trade and tuition up to matriculation standard.

Art classes were led by Murray Griffin who also painted many scenes around Changi PoW Camp. The Australian War Memorial has a collection of his art.

While Changi University was an AIF Initiative, it was open to all.

Alick Downer provided a series of lectures on The Government in Two Worlds. This is one of the documents to survive the October 1944 confiscation of papers and writing materials by the Japanese.

The education program declined as it began to be disrupted by work gangs being sent to other areas. The first of these was A Force going to the Thai-Burma Railway work camps in June 1943.

On 10 October 1944 the Japanese guards swooped and confiscated papers and pens. A number of note books and diaries were buried in tins cans or otherwise hidden for later recovery after the Japanese surrender.

While the library continued until the Japanese surrender, courses at the "Changi University" were no longer held due to lack of people. Some men continued with private study, using the library as a resource in what must have been particularly trying circumstances.

Some men who started at "Changi University" were shipped to work camps at Kuching in Sarawak where there was a similar education program. This education program also continued surreptitiously until liberation despite a Japanese edict that it was to stop.

Issues that all the officers and men faced were mistreatment by guards, malnourishment, demands of work parties and significant overcrowding, which was much worse after June 1944 when the men were moved out of the Barracks and into the area around the Changi Prison. In October 1944 the guards seized paper and writing materials making life and study even more difficult.

== Changi Newspaper ==
Some allied men initially produced a newspaper with sketches and news for their section of the prison camp. This declined as men were transferred to work gangs away from Singapore.

== Timeline of Australian men at Changi ==
The following tabular timeline shows the rapid reduction in men able to take part in education, sport or entertainment activities at Changi. The "Changi University" was depopulated by men being sent away on work parties. While it continued, it did so under increasingly trying circumstances. The table has been compiled from records held at the Australian War Memorial, but number are approximate as some inflows of men were not recorded nor were some of the deaths at Changi.

Changi Event Date	Event	Australian Strength per Event	Subsequent Deaths	Approximate Number of Australian Prisoners at Changi	PoW Elapsed Days /Month from Surrender
15 Feb 1942	Surrender of Singapore	14,972		14,972	Day 1
19 Feb 1942	Education Program Started				Day 4
11 Mar 1942	First Classes start – program in place				Day 24
Mar 1942	PoWs erect fences around POW Camp and between sections within				1 month
May 1942	"A" Force majority sent to Burma	3,000	479	11,972	3 Months
Jul 1942	"B" Force sent to Sandakan	1,496	most	10,476	5 Months
Aug 1942	Senior Officers sent to Japan via Formosa and Korea	14	-	10,462	6 Months
Aug 1942	Arrival of delicate PoW guards				6 Months
30 Aug 1942	Selarang Barracks Incidentstarted		Some		6 Months
Nov 1942	"C" Force sent to Japan	563	?	9,899	9 Months
March 1943	"D" Force sent to Burma	2,242	?	7,657	13 Months
Mar 1943	"E" Force sent to Borneo	500	Most	7,157	13 Months
April 1943	"F" Force sent to Thailand – A mixed Allied force	3,662	1,438	3,495	14 Months
Apr 1943	"G" Force sent to Japan	200	?	3,295	14 Months
May 1943	"H" Force sent to Thailand	600	179	2,695	15 Months
18 May 1943	AGH Rostrumformed		-		15 Months
Jun 1943	"J" Force sent to Japan	300	?	2,395	16 Months
Jun 1943	"K" Force sent to Thailand	55	?	2,340	16 Months
Jun 1943	"L" Force sent to Thailand	73	?	2,500	16 Months
10 October 1943	Double Tenth Incident		nil PoWs		16 Months
Oct 1943	Depleted "A" Force returned to Changi	2,521	-	5,021	20 Months
Nov 1943	Depleted "F" Force returned to Changi^{[11]}	2,224	-	7,245	~21 Months
Nov 1943	Depleted "H" Force returned to Changi	421	-	7,666	~21 Months
11 Jan 1944	AIF Routine Order No. 230 – Engineering Studentship^{[12]}for £A500				23 Months
31 Mar 1944	Last set of Minutes for AGH Rostrum				25 Months
June 1944	Moved out of Selarang Barracks to concentrate around Changi Prison			7,666	28 Months
1 Jul 1944	Sent to Japan – A mixed Allied force of 2,250 men	1,000	?	6,666	29 Months
−6 Sept 1944	Sent to Japan – Prisoners previously on the Thai-Burma Railway	2,300	543	4,366	31 Months
10 Oct 1944	Confiscation of pencils and paper				32 Months
Late 1944	Sent to Japan arriving 15 January 1945	600	?	4,366	~34 Months
15 Aug 1945	Japanese surrender announced				42 Months
2 Sept 1945	Japanese surrender signed				42 Months 18 Days
5 Sept 1945	Liberated by 5th Indian Division				42 Months 21 Days
13 Sept 1945	Evacuation of Australian PoWs from Singapore	5,549		5,549	42 Months 29 Days

== Impact on later lives ==
Changi University engaged with over 9,000 PoWs. It provided courses at many levels and taught about 400 men to read proficiently. Despite some initial reluctance, many disadvantaged men eventually undertook to learn to read or to significantly improve their reading from a basic standard.

Lieutenant Hugh Wearing left school at 15 during the depression to do labouring work to put food on the table at home. He had a basic education and was initially reluctant to join the Changi courses. He eventually did start a course and later moved to Kuching where he continued studies. On the evacuation ship back to Australia the army education service, typed up reports so Hugh and other men like him were able to receive their PoW Matriculation on their return to Australia. With this recognition Hugh attended university.

James Clavell said "Changi became my university instead of my prison. … Among the inmates there were experts in all walks of life — the high and the low roads. I studied and absorbed everything I could from physics to counterfeiting, but most of all I learned the art of surviving."

== Other PoW Education Programs ==
There were 2 other notable PoW education programs in Asia. These were at Hong Kong and at Kuching.

PoWs in Hong Kong obtained benefits of a similar but smaller program initiated by the senior education officer Major W. de B. Wood who had previously been a barrister. Major Charles Boxer, the British intelligence chief in Hong Kong before the war lectured at an academic level on the early Portuguese and Dutch maritime empires in which he was the world expert. Senior businessmen and bankers lectured on business and economics. There were courses in several languages including:

- Spanish;
- Cantonese;
- Urdu.

There were also lectures on, eastern philosophy, art appreciation, yacht building, and weather forecasting.

"Kuching University" in Sarawak started by Frank Bell was run on a similar basis to "Changi University". It was augmented by Australian officers and men sent as part of work parties from Changi Camp. The well educated officers helped build a more extensive program of education. This education program came under considerable pressure in 1944 when paper and writing material was confiscated and gatherings banned. The "Kuching University" also continued to the Japanese surrender under trying circumstances.

== See also ==
- Selarang Barracks incident
- Double Tenth Incident
- SGH War Memorial
- AGH Rostrum Club at Changi
- Far East prisoners of war
- King Rat (Clavell novel)
- Burma Railway
- Hell ship
- Sandakan Death Marches
