= Alan Crook =

Electrical engineer and business man

Robert Alan Crook
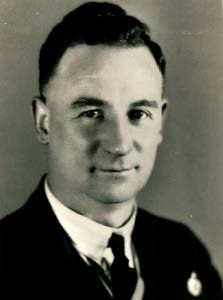
- Born: 2 November 1897; Benalla, Victoria, Australia
- Died: 9 August 1965 (aged 67); Sydney, New South Wales, Australia
- Education: Melbourne Technical College
- Occupation: Engineer
- Title: Member of the Order of the British Empire (MBE)
- Spouse: Muriel A Waterhouse
- Children: 1

Robert Alan (Alan) Crook (2 November 1897 – 9 August 1965) was an Australian electrical engineer and business man with a social involvement, and is recognised as the founder of Australian Rostrum.

== Early life ==
Crook was the son of a Methodist minister and moved around Victoria with his parents. He was born in Benalla, and attended school in Sale, Shepparton, Kyneton and Castlemaine. In 1911 he joined the Thompson Engineering Works in Castlemaine as an apprentice fitter aged 14. He also kept studying at night at the Castlemaine Technical College.

In 1915, Crook moved to Melbourne with his parents and the rest of the family. He took up an apprenticeship with the Victorian Railways and studied at the Melbourne Technical College.

Crook was keenly interested in Wireless when young. He was granted a license to run an amateur radio station in 1913 when he turned 16.

== The war years ==
After the start of World War I, Crook joined the AIF and served in the 34th Fortress Engineers from November 1915 to October 1916. He then transferred to the Australian Flying Corps, initially as an Air Mechanic 2nd class. He embarked for England on 11 May 1917, to support the war on the Western Front in Europe. After additional training in England, he was assigned to the 8th Training Squadron, Australian Flying Corp. and served in Wendover from 24 October 1917, Cirencester in January 1918 and then at Leighterton until April 1919. During this time he was promoted to Air Mechanic 1st class. He worked on the Sopwith Pup, Camel and Snipe aircraft. When the squadron was disbanded he returned to Australia.

Crook was demobilised from the Australian Flying Corps on 6 May 1919.

== Career ==
After completing military duties, Crook returned to the Victorian Railways. After a short time he joined a small company that soon was taken over by Australian Electrical Industries.

To advance his career, Crook decided to gain experience in the United States, setting sail in August 1921. He gained experience in a number of large electrical engineering firms, including doing drafting work in Chicago, before going to the UK for a year to do a specialised course with Metropolitan-Vickers in Manchester. He left for Melbourne, Australia, in September 1925. On his return he went to work at Metropolitan-Vickers.

In January 1926 Metropolitan-Vickers sent him to their Sydney branch. Here he was heavily involved in his new job and continued studies. In 1929 he was accepted by examination as a corporate member of the Institute of Engineers, Australia.

Crook formed Alan Crook Electrical as an importer, electrical engineering and manufacturing company in 1937 with a capital of £10,000. The first directors were Robert A. Crook, Jack S. Wilcox, and Gregory B. Kater. They had a factory in Camperdown and later St Leonards for producing and assembling electrical components. Their business indices were in Barrack Street, Sydney. They made a range of products, from master-and-slave clocks to electrical transmission equipment.

The company produced outdoor switchgear and accessories, synchronous clocks, impulse clock systems and timing devices, Slydlock fuses, Burndy clamps and other electrical equipment. The electrification of the New South Wales South Coast from Sydney to the town of Eden was begun before World War II and continued through the war; it was the company's largest project.

In 1940 the company bought into the Electric Clocks and Instruments Pty Ltd, and Crook became a director. He wound up the company, absorbing their equipment and customers into his company.

== Other roles ==
Crook resigned from Alan Crook Electrical in April 1947. He was supplanted while in the United States on a study tour of modern manufacturing methods. He then started business as an electrical and mechanical engineering consultant.

Crook also became more active in the Institution of Engineers and other industry bodies. In the Institution of Engineers he was:

- Chairman of the electrical branch of the Sydney division,
- a member of the federal council of the institution,
- a member of the finance committee.

For Australian Standards Association he became a member of the switchgear committee. He was also President of the Electrical Manufacturers' Association of NSW and a member of the American Institute of Electrical Engineers.

A month after the death of his wife, in 1963, Crook had a minor stroke. This forced semi-retirement. He closed his office in North Sydney and then did a limited amount of work from home.

== Personal life ==
He married Muriel Waterhouse, the daughter of Reverent John Waterhouse, an early minister of the Wesley Church in Hobart. In 1929 they built a house in Killara, a dormitory suburb for gentlemen 14 kilometres (about 9 miles) north-west of the Sydney Central Business District.

They had one son, Keith Crook, who he went fishing with along the South Coast of New South Wales with two aboriginal men Crook had met during installation of the electricity transmission in the area.

Crook was also a keen gardener and amateur apiarist.

== Community ==
Crook was active in the broader community by:

- being the Founder of Rostrum Australia, 1934;
- member of Gordon Methodist Trust;
- co-founder of the Amateur Apiarist Association of New South Wales;
- Vice-President of the Killara Music Club;
- Ranger under the Wild Flowers Protection Act;
- Justice of the Peace;
- Past Master of his Masonic Lodge;
- organiser of Construction and Industry Fair 1952, appointed by NSW Premier.

== Rostrum ==
During 1925 while in Manchester studying, Crook joined The Rostrum public speaking club at the Manchester YMCA founded by Sidney Wicks. He returned to Australia with the intention of starting a Rostrum club but was delayed by work commitments, study and marriage. The 1923 Directing Secretary of the Manchester YMCA was Robert Swainson who became the first Freeman awarded by The Rostrum, and Crook became the fourth Freeman. Freemanship is awarded in recognition of a high level and long standing service to Rostrum and the community

At a meeting with two friends, Stuart McPhee, an Electrical Engineer and Fred Seamons, an accountant, in May 1930, Crook explained the objects and methods of The Rostrum club in Manchester. Crook then met with Robert Swainson, who had become General Secretary of the Sydney YMCA. Robert offered to assist with the formation of Rostrum in Australia and to provide rooms for meetings. It was left to Crook to gather members.

On the evening of 21 July 1930, the seventh anniversary of the formation of The Rostrum club in Manchester, a meeting of 9 people was held at the YMCA. Amongst the attendees were:

- Alan Crook;
- Robert Swainson;
- Stuart McPhee;
- Fred Seamons.

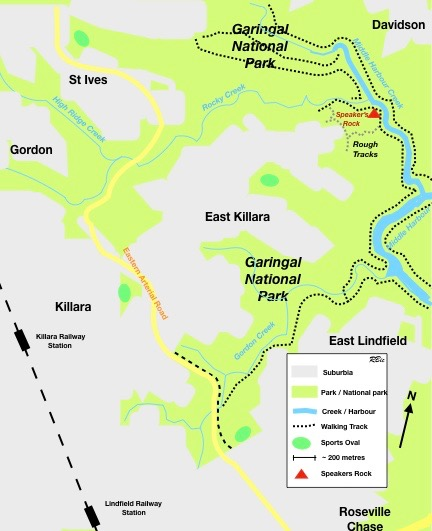
Rostrum Australia was started under an Angophora Tree at the junction of Rocky Creek and Middle Harbour Creek, by Speakers Rock

Crook handed around copies of the constitution of The Rostrum club of Manchester. Each attendee read a paragraph. The meeting resolved that a society to be called Australian Rostrum No. 1 was formed. It was also resolved that the meeting be adjourned to Sunday 10 August 1930 and to meet at the junction of Middle Harbour Creek and Rocky Creek, near East Killara, over 3 kilometres (about 2 miles) above the Roseville Bridge.

At the next meeting on the evening of Thursday 28 August 1930, Crook was elected Chief Gardian of Order (Secretary), Robert Swainson, Speaker of the Last Word (Critic / Coach), and John Reaburn, Purseholder (Treasurer). It was decided to limit club membership to a maximum of 25. A constitution was developed in August 1931 allowing for additional clubs with a federated model of zoned centralised state based Daises for their oversight.

Crook was regarded as an effective organiser with an eye for detail. He was considered a persuasive, good communicator and while he was a competent public speaker, he was not known as a great orator.

A second club was formed on 6 November 1931, as a result of Crook writing to a number of acquaintances encouraging them to join him in the lunch time club starting on that day. Crook was elected president of this club. Within a few weeks average attendance reached 20 members. With a third club being formed in 1933, a Dais was therefore formed with representation from the 3 clubs. Alan Crook was elected Dais secretary, and continued in this role for 36 years until his death in 1965.

When Crook traveled to Melbourne on business in 1934 he gathered business associates, including Stuart McPhee, who had moved to Melbourne to meet at Buckley & Nunn's restaurant on 3 May 1934 and they formed a Rostrum club in Melbourne.

As Rostrum clubs grew in number in New South Wales, Crook was present each time for the inaugural meeting. While Crook became a member of a number of Rostrum club, he was only ever a member of 3 clubs at any one time.

He traveled to Brisbane on business in 1937, with the resultant meeting agreeing to form a Rostrum Club there on 6 May 1937.

In 1938 on creation of the Federal Rostrum Council, Crook became its secretary and continued in that role until his death 28 years later. The proposal in 1938 to the NSW Dais to affiliate women's club to Rostrum was strongly opposed by Crook, so the matter was dropped. By this time women were admitted to The Rostrum club in Manchester.

During WWII with many members on active service, the growth of Rostrum stalled. A Rostrum Advancement Fund was established, Alan Crook was one of the three trustees.

On a 1945 business trip that included the United Kingdom, Crook visited Manchester where he was able to attend a special meeting of The Rostrum club and attend their annual pilgrimage to the yew tree at Greendale Farm, Mottram St Andrew, where he addressed the meeting on the success of Rostrum in Australia. At that time, there were 56 Rostrum clubs across the Australia.

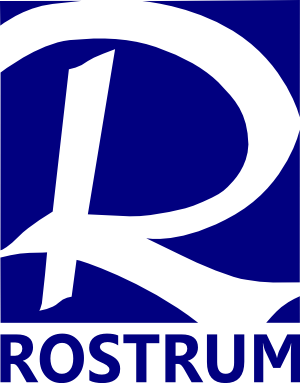
Rostrum logo

The 1955 national convention held in Tasmania, resolved that Crook would also have the title of Australian Founder bestowed on him and would in future be addressed as Australian Founder.

In 1958 Crook moved his consulting office across the harbour from Sydney to North Sydney. He joined with two Rostrum members to form a club in what was becoming a second business centre for the greater Sydney area.

Crook proposed to the Australian Rostrum Council that a stylised "R" on a map of Australia be used as the Rostrum logo. He was asked to produce samples and circulate to council members for consideration. Ultimately a simple stylised R was adopted.

After the death of his wife, Muriel, and his minor stroke in 1963, Crook continued to be active in Rostrum at the club level, at NSW Dais and at the Australian Rostrum Council. Muriel's death was a significant loss personally and administratively. While she could not join Rostrum at that time, she made a significant contribution to Rostrum by typing letters and documents for Crook and his roles in Rostrum.

He substantially recovered, undertook a tour around Australia, spending time on his hobby of photography. On his return he prepared an illustrated speech titled See Australia First, giving the perspective of a seasoned world traveler. He toured Rostrum clubs in a number of states with this speech.

The Australian Rostrum Council created an annual and perpetual award to be presented to the club that made an outstanding contribution to Rostrum and the community each year, called the R Alan Crook Award.

The last Rostrum event Crook attended was an inauguration dinner in Dubbo on 3 July 1965 for newly formed Dubbo Rostrum Club. That year there were 165 Rostrum clubs around Australia.

== Later years ==
His wife, Muriel, died in 1963. Shortly after, Crook suffered a mild stroke which forced him to retire at the age of 65. He recovered sufficiently to embark on a photographic tour around Australia.

He was awarded an MBE in the June 1965 Birthday Honours for service to the community, and particularly in recognition of his work in founding Australian Rostrum. He died on 9 August 1965, age 67.
