= Australian Rostrum =

Organization

Rostrum
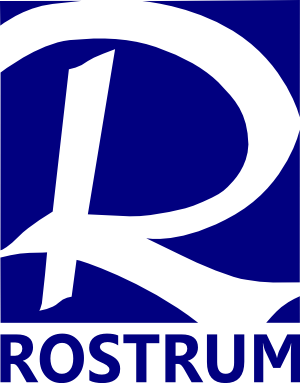
- Rostrum logo
- Formation: 1923
- Type: Club, public speaking
- Location(s): Australia and England
- Official language: English
- Website: www.rostrum.com.au

Rostrum Australia (formerly Australian Rostrum) is an association of Australian public-speaking clubs, founded on 21 July 1930. It is the main continuation of the original Rostrum club ("The Rostrum") founded in Manchester, United Kingdom on 21 July 1923. This club's other surviving descendants are "Rochdale Rostrum", a Rostrum club in the Greater Manchester area founded in 1978; and the presently dormant "Wellington Rostrum Club" in New Zealand.

Its early establishment makes Rostrum the longest running public speaking organisation in the world.

Rostrum clubs aim to help their members improve their speaking and meeting skills. They do this primarily through regular club meetings and less frequent competitions.

Australian Rostrum's main national competition for members is the "Sidney Wicks Speaking Competition". This is held roughly every six to eight years. In other years, state and territory competitions are dominant.

Its other main national competition is the annual Rostrum Voice of Youth (VOY). This is open to all high school students. It involves a prepared speech and a short notice speech.

== History ==
=== 1920s ===
Rostrum was founded by Sidney F. Wicks. Wicks who was an author, an advertising executive for the Manchester Guardian, public relations practitioner Company Director and Newspaper Chief Editor. He came to believe that people needed to think through their own decision-making processes rather than just accept the promotions of the press and other interested parties. On 21 July 1923, he founded a club in Manchester with the prime purpose to encourage men to listen to many sources before formulating their own opinions, and then to speak their minds to groups of others in a way that would encourage them to listen. The club began as an offshoot of the Manchester YMCA Businessmen's Speaking Class.

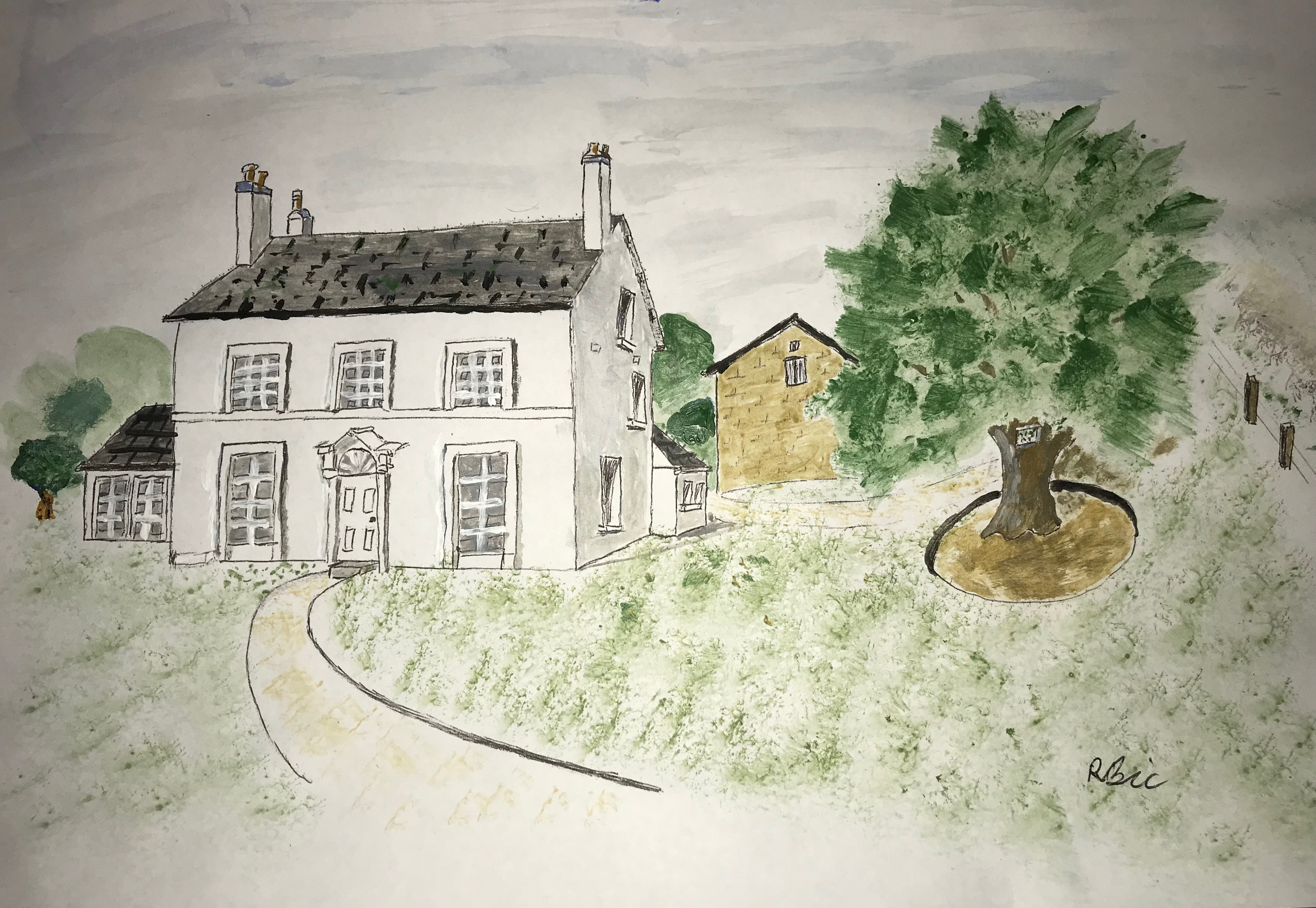
Greendale Farm Mottram St Andrew, Yew Tree under which The Rostrum Club was Founded

After the first meeting under a yew tree at Greendale Farm near Manchester, meetings for YMCA members were held on Wednesday evenings in the local YMCA building. In 1924 a young Australian Engineer training in Manchester, Alan Crook (later MBE), joined Rostrum while studying at the Victoria University of Manchester. The following year he returned to Australia.

=== 1930s ===
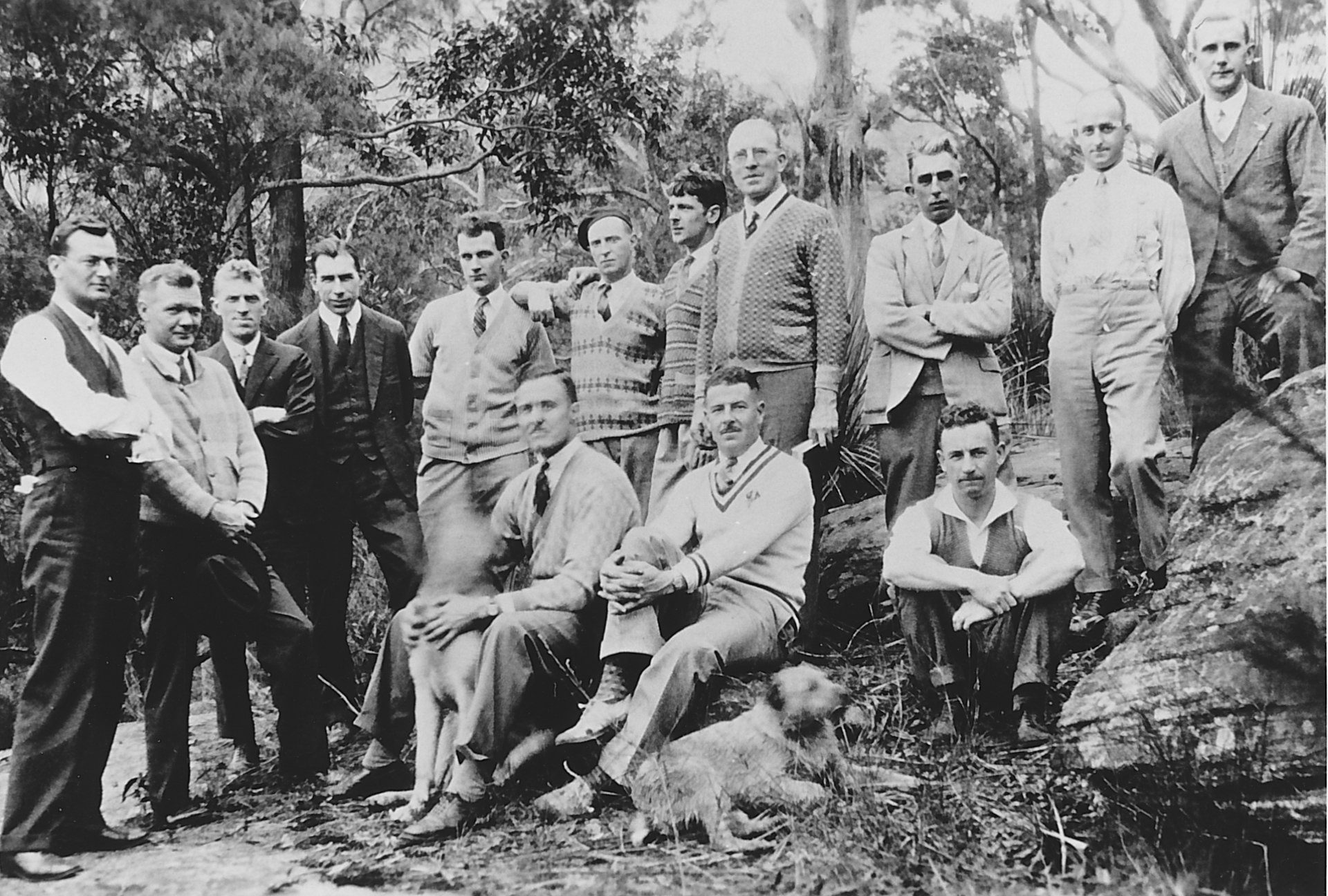
Rostrum Club 1, July 1931 Pilgrimage to Speaker's Rock, Back Row: s c Robertson, C M Purnell, J G Hardman, Stuart McPhee, NC Burgess, Hilton Gordon, R Noble, Robert Swainson, A C Stiles, Edgar Barratt, Fred Seasons. Front Row: Jack Caffin, Charles Claiton, Alan Crook

Crook, with the help of Robert Swainson and Stuart McPhee, formed a Rostrum Club in Sydney. It was founded on 21 July 1930, coincidentally exactly seven years after the original club. It was founded under an Angophora tree on the shores of Middle Harbour in Sydney. Alan Crook was the first President and Robert Swainson the Critic. Like the Manchester Club, this was a dinner club. In November 1931, "Luncheon Club No.1" was formed, Alan Crook again being the first President. "No.2 Luncheon Club" was formed in July 1932, No.3 in July 1933 and No.4 Club in July 1934. The original club was given the name of "Foundation Club".

In May 1934, Alan Crook went to Melbourne for a holiday and formed a Rostrum Club which a few months later, together with the then five Sydney Clubs, became the first Dais (regional council). Fred Seamons was the first President and held this office for 15 years. A second Rostrum club was formed in Melbourne in July 1935 and the Victorian clubs then formed their own Dais.

On the evening of 3 December 1935, George McNicholl, Treasurer of the Melbourne & Metropolitan Board of Works and Chairman of the Australian Institute of Secretaries (AIS), moved a very gracious vote of thanks to a guest speaker from the SA branch of the AIS. Afterwards, some SA residents present asked McNicholl how he became such a good speaker. He told them about Rostrum. This discussion lead to the first South Australian meeting. It was held in Adelaide on 18 February 1936 in the inner suburb of North Terrace.

In 1937, Alan Crook took a business trip to Brisbane and during this trip, he initiated Queensland's first club on 6 May 1937. By November that year Brisbane's second club was launched.

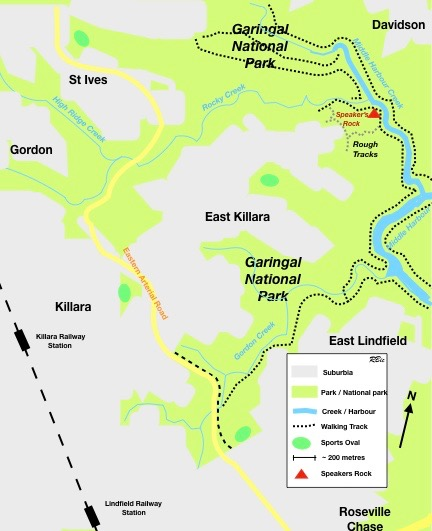
Rostrum Australia was started under an Angophora Tree at the junction of Rocky Creek and Middle Harbour Creek, by Speakers Rock.

An Australian Rostrum Council was established on 5 January 1938, bringing together the state Daises. Fred Seamons was the President for the first eight years. Alan Crook served as Secretary for 27 years until his death on 9 August 1965.

By the end of the 1930s there were many Rostrum clubs throughout NSW, Victoria, SA and Queensland.

=== 1940s ===
Victorian Rostrum Clubs held their first conference at Healsville Golf Club in 1940 Rostrum in Australia took a while to spread further west and south, as World War II curtailed expansion.

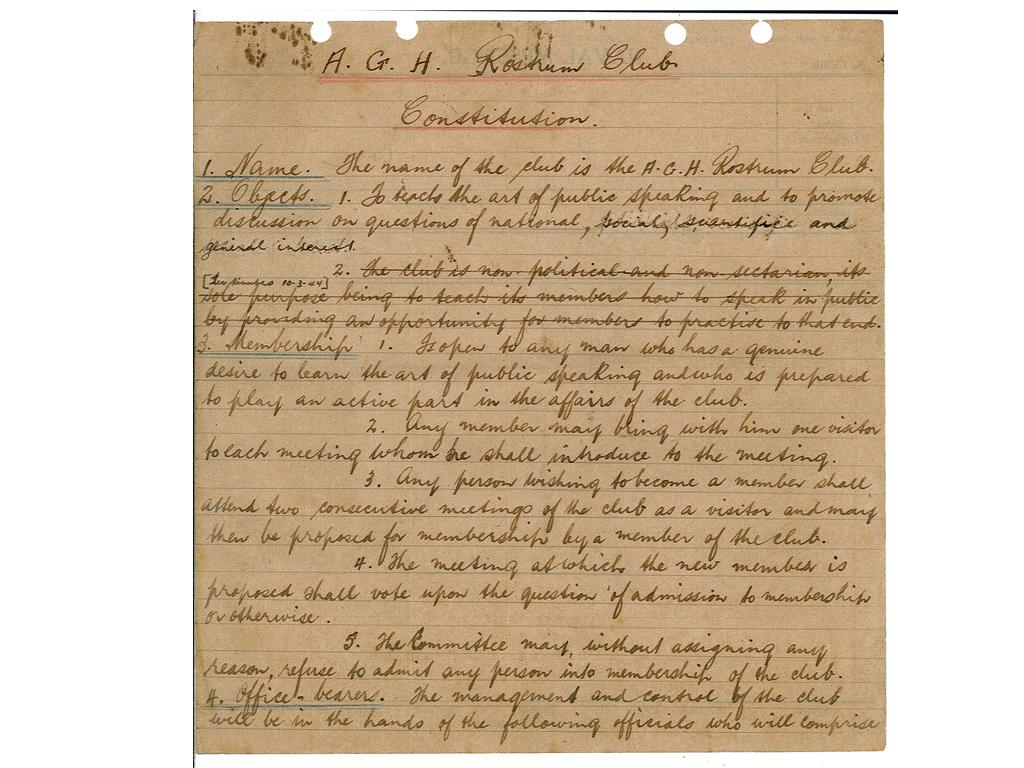
AGH Rostrum Constitution Changi – Page 1

However, there was some growth to the north, with the AHG Rostrum Club running in the Changi POW camp from 1943 to 1944.

The first club in Tasmania started in 1947 and Western Australia's first club was founded on 21 May 1948.

=== 1950s ===
The second Rostrum Club in the UK was started in 1951. By this time, there were nearly 100 Rostrum Clubs in Australia. Speaking clubs were not as popular in the UK as in Australia, the main speaking club group there at the time, Toastmasters had only six clubs before World War II.

The ACT's first club was founded on 3 March 1953. In the 1950s the Penguin Club of Australia, which was a similar club to Rostrum but for women, continued to expand. It had groups in every state and in 1956 the Federal President, Jean Ellis, witnessed a first branch in Canberra. Interesting, it shows that the new Penguin Club was expecting a member of Rostrum to attend their meeting to offer constructive criticism of the new members. In the same year, the Secretary of the Victorian Dias, Jo Davis, began a speaking competition for Victorian members. This competition later took his name as the "Jo Davis Cup" after his death in 1967.

In the late '50s, a Dais was formed for the ACT. This Dais went on to include clubs from nearby parts of NSW.

A book titled Rostrum in Victoria: 1934–1959 by RE Tonkin was released by the Victorian Dais around this time.

=== 1960s ===
The 1960s were a time of rapid growth in the organisation in the ACT and surrounds. Five new clubs became established there during this time.

Take the Chair, a book on meeting procedure was written for Rostrum by WA members Cecil Carr and Alan Foyster in 1962. The book sold over 90,000 copies in Australia between its release and 1990, when it was rewritten.

In 1965 Alan Crook died, shortly after receiving an MBE for his work establishing Australian Rostrum.

Have something to say: a text book for public speakers was written in 1969 by ACT member Laurie Burgess.

Chairmanship and Public Speaking was written for Rostrum in the 1960s by NSW member Evan Bowen-Thomas.

=== 1970s ===
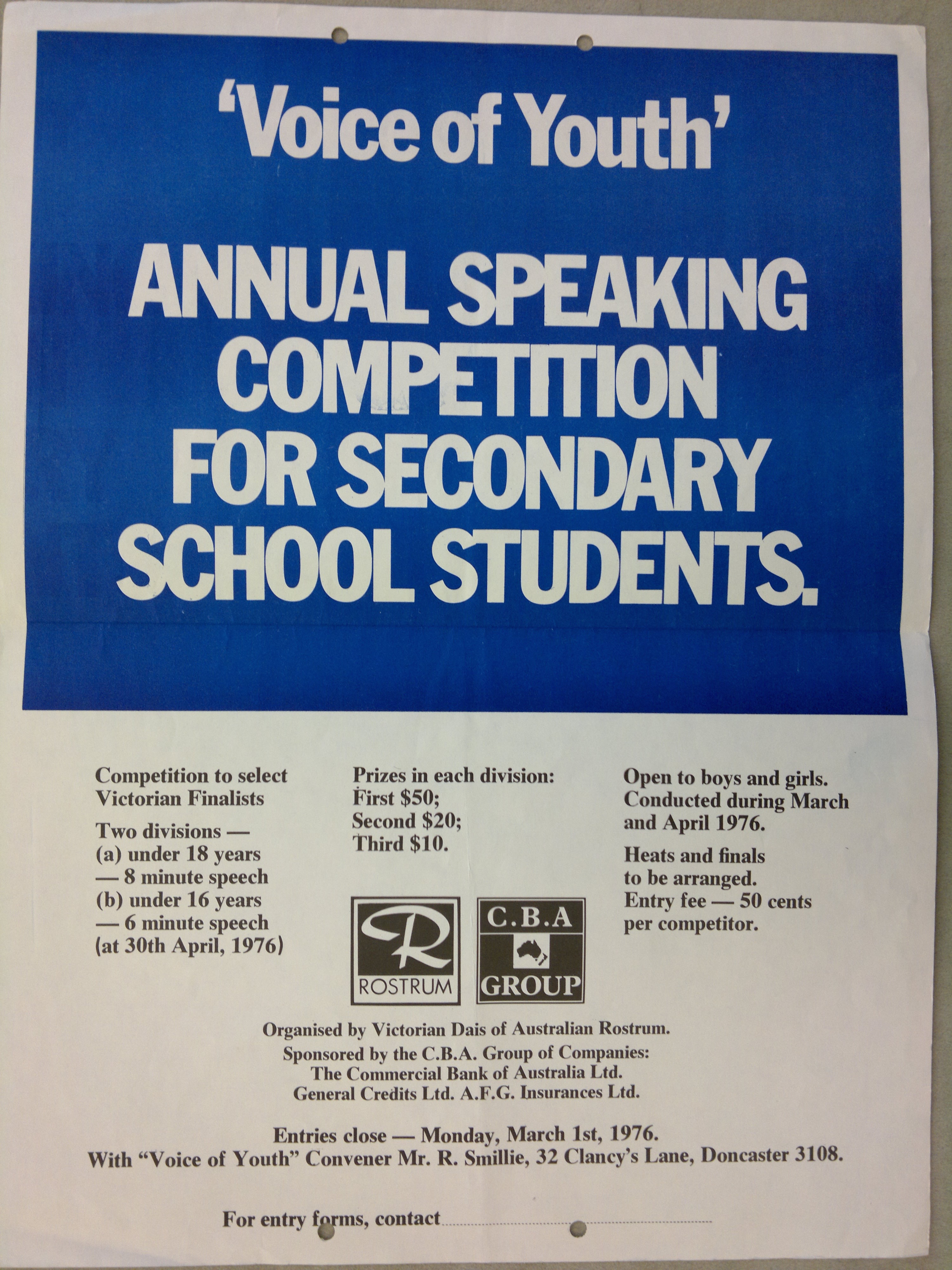
Rostrum Voice of Youth 1976 Advertisement

Various levels of Australian Rostrum ran youth competitions in the early 1970s. In 1974, the various NSW local competitions were combined into a statewide "Voice of Youth" competition. In 1975, Voice of Youth went national, the first national final being held in Canberra. This competition continues today.

1974 saw the creation of the "ACT Rostrum Critics Club", a group devoted to improving critiques in the ACT.

Until 1978, Rostrum in Australia was restricted to men but in that year, the national constitution was changed to allow the entry of women. However, women could not become a member without the Dais council in their state or territory also changing their rules to allow it. Within a few months there were female members in all states except Western Australia, which remained male only until 1986.

Also in 1978, a new club was founded in the UK – Rochdale Rostrum.

The release of "History of ACT Rostrum" by Roy Ayrton and Tom Trebilco was another 1978 event. Tom was later awarded an MBE for his Rostrum work.

=== 1980s ===
The first "Sidney Wicks Speaking Competition" was held in Sydney in 1980 to celebrate 50 years of Rostrum in Australia. It was won by David Mead from WA and presented by the Governor General of Australia, Sir Zelman Cowen. The competition is also known as the "National Rostrum Speaking Competition" and "Sidney Wicks Trophy".

1984 saw Victorian member David Shaw write Towards Better Meetings.

In 1985 Rostrum Victoria celebrated its Golden Jubilee with a dinner at the National Gallery of Victoria and other celebrations.

Western Australian clubs began to admit women in 1986.

Also in 1986, NSW member John White and WA President David Julian Price released the first version of Rostrum's current curriculum standard, the "Personal Development Program" (then "Member's Development Program").

Brighter Rostrum meetings: how to make your Rostrum Club meetings more interesting (edited by George Shaw) and History of ACT Rostrum, Club 8, 1965–1986 (by Eric Martin and Don Clark) were yet more Rostrum titles released in 1986.

1987 saw Rostrum release the book Excellence for Communicators by Laurie Burgess. The then Prime Minister, Bob Hawke, wrote the foreword.

This book was followed in 1988 by How Do I?, and the South Australian "Word master: word a day calendar: a vocabulary expander concept".

The second Sidney Wicks competition was held in Canberra in August 1988 during the Australian Bicentenary celebrations, and was won by Bill Smith from WA. It was held in conjunction with a national conference entitled "Speak up Australia", held at the Australian Academy of Science's "Shine Dome". The conference was joint project of Australian Rostrum and the Penguin Club of Australia, aimed to promote oral communication, especially to children. In 1989, the book A Critic's Bag of Remedies was produced by WA members.

=== 1990s ===
In 1990, a new version of popular Take the Chair (rewritten by Rostrum WA members David Julian Price, Harold Luxton and Bill Smith) was released.

1990 also saw NSW member Alan Milston release the history Rostrum in Australia 1930–1965.

In 1993, Australian Rostrum declared Robyn Williams "Speaker of the Year".

Sydney hosted the third Sidney Wicks competition in 1994. The winner was Brian Gillespie of Queensland Rostrum.

Also in 1994, Bert Crummer wrote the 84-page book A brief history of Rostrum Club No. 3 (Brisbane).

In 1997, New Zealand Rostrum declared Peter Biggs "Speaker of the Decade". Also in that year, Not to be silent: a history of Rostrum in Tasmania was written by Malcolm Grant, Meetings Made Easy (a revised version of Towards Better Meetings) was produced by Arthur Martin for Rostrum Victoria, and South Australian member Ron Johnson released Tips on Public Speaking and Meeting Procedure.

The fourth Sidney Wicks competition was held in Hobart on 7 August 1999 in conjunction with the first Rostrum National Convention. The winner was Andrew Dickson from the ACT zone.

=== 2000s ===
2000 saw the release of The torch of truth and freedom: the South Australian Rostrum history, 1936–1999 by Colin Chiverton, and Tips on Public Speaking and Meeting Procedure: Volume 2 by Ron Johnson.

In 2005 the fifth Sidney Wicks competition was held in Perth on 15 October at the National Convention celebrating 75 years of Rostrum in Australia. The winner was Clarrie Pryor from Tasmania.

In 2005, there were over 140 clubs in Australia, collectively containing nearly 1700 members. There is currently one small club in Manchester, England. The sole remaining club in New Zealand, in Wellington, is at present in recess.

Over 3000 students participate in the Voice of Youth each year, covering over 500 schools.

=== 2010s ===
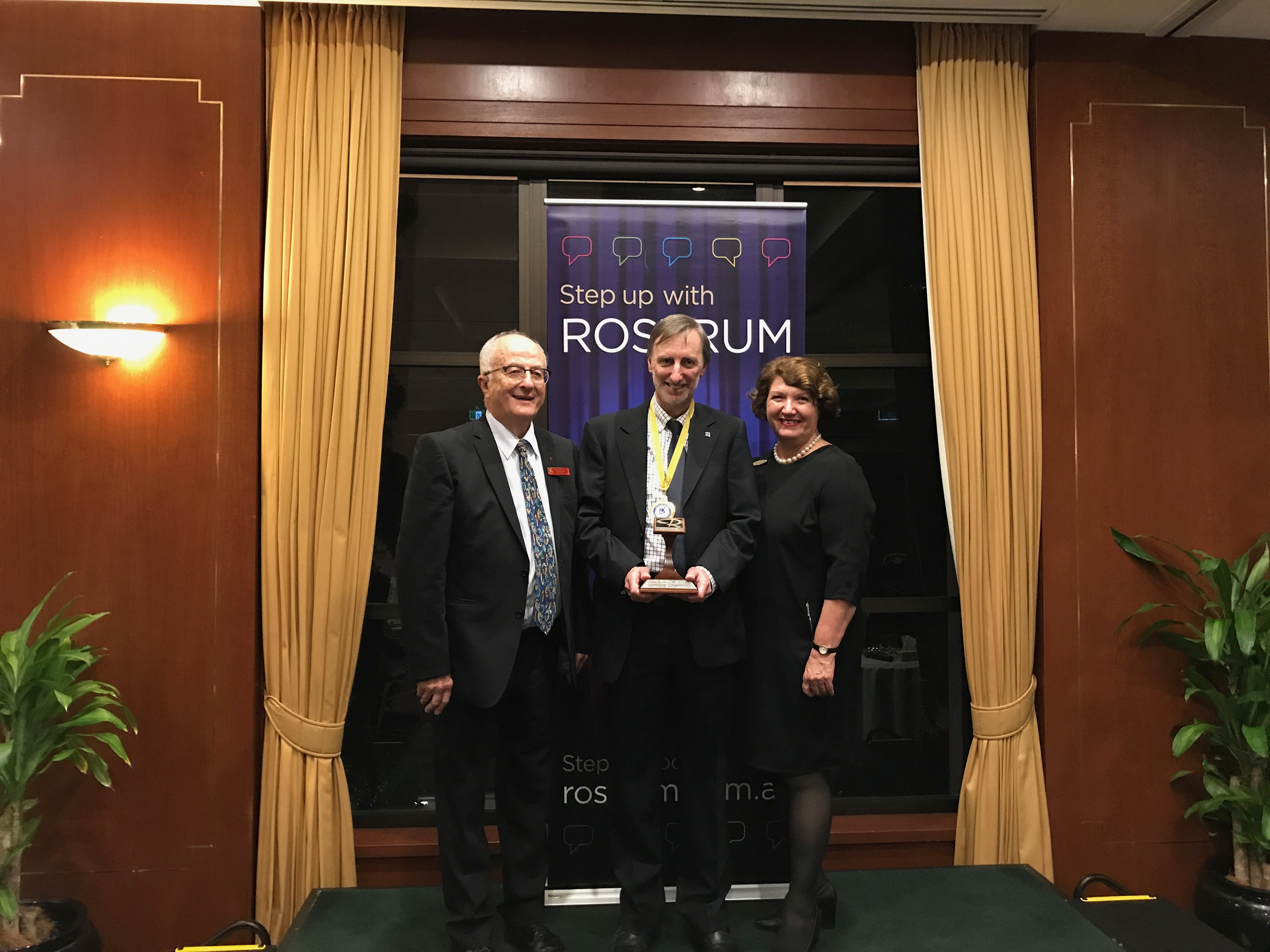
Rob Ellison (centre) winner of the national Sidney Wicks Competition at the presentation of the award, with David Matters President of Rostrum Australia and Councillor Kate Richards, Pullenvale Ward, Brisbane City Council

In 2011 the sixth Sidney Wicks competition was held in Adelaide South Australia in October in conjunction with the National Convention. The winner was Jenny Blain of Malvern Rostrum Club 45 in Victoria.

The seventh Sidney Wicks competition was held in Brisbane in conjunction with the annual Australian Rostrum Council conference and the forty third Voice of Youth National finals in late July 2017. The winner was Rob Ellison of Carnegie Rostrum Club 68 in Victoria.

=== 2020s ===
2020 is the 90th year of Rostrum in Australia and the 97th year since Rostrum was formed in Manchester, UK.

The first On-Line Rostrum Club has been formed with members in most states of Australia and, at time, overseas. The Club is developing different skills and techniques required for effective on-line communications. Meetings are fortnightly and in the evening Australian Eastern Time.

The eighth Sidney Wicks competition was held in Melbourne. The winner was Will Cassidy from Tasmania.

A Brief History of Rostrum in Queensland (1937–2021) was released by Bill Smith Rostrum Club 3 Brisbane in June 2022.

== State and territory competitions ==
Each year clubs in Australian states and the Australian Capital Territory hold inter club regional competitions which lead into statewide competitions.

These typically determine the Speaker of the Year for the state or territory. In Victoria the competition is called the state Jo Davis Cup in recognition of a previous active and respected member.

The national Sydney Wicks competition is held between representatives of the State and Territory Rostrum Zones every 5 to 7 years as part of an annual Australian Rostrum Council conference.

== Books ==
A Resource Manual for Critics, Australian Rostrum, National Critics Council, March 2009

Take the Chair, A Practical Tool for People Who Attend Meetings, D Price, B Smith, H Luxton, 8th Edition, Rostrum 1990 ISBN 0-947173-11-0

Rostrum in Australia 1930 – 1965, Freeman Alan Milston, Australian Rostrum Council, 1990 ISBN 0-947173-12-9

Towards Better Meetings, David Shaw, Australian Rostrum, Rigby, 1984, ISBN 0-7270-2000-5

Bigger, Better, Brighter Rostrum Meetings, Freeman George Shaw, Australian Rostrum Council

A Critic's Bag of Remedies, Australian Rostrum, 1988

Chairmanship and Public Speaking, Rostrum Clubs NSW, Fourth Edition, Edward Bowen-Thomas

== See also ==
- AGH Rostrum Club at Changi
- Alan Crook
- Association of Speakers Clubs
- Ron Kitchenn
- Sidney F. Wicks
