= AGH Rostrum Club at Changi =

Australian WWII POW club in Singapore

A. G. H. Rostrum - Changi
- Formation: May 18, 1943
- Founders: a public meeting of POWs
- Type: Secular, service club, education, public speaking
- Location: Changi Prison, Singapore
- Members: probably less than 100

AGH Rostrum Club Changi was a Rostrum Club formed during World War II at the Prisoner of War camp at Singapore's Changi Prison. The club was formed by members of the Australian Army's 13th Australian General Hospital (AGH), 8th Division AIF and probably included other allied servicemen.

== Background ==
The AGH Rostrum Club at Changi was formed on much the same principles as the Rostrum Club in Manchester and the Australian Rostrum Clubs. It held to an education aim and was non-sectarian and non-political as espoused by the Rostrum founder, Sidney F. Wicks. It was formed at a time of a great deprivation for the prisoners of war. During this time Changi POW camp was being used to supply men into work camps in Malaya, Thailand, Burma and Sandakan leading to churn in members.

The 13th Australian General Hospital (AGH) was hurriedly formed on 11 August 1941 at the Caulfield Racecourse, in response to the need for a second Australian military medical team in Malaya. They departed for Singapore on 2 September 1941, on His Majesty's Australian Hospital Ship (H.M.A.H.S.) Wanganella. The strength of the 13th Australian General Hospital medical team was 18 Officers, 1 Chaplain, 20 Warrant Officers and Sergeants, 44 nurses, 3 Masseuses, and 126 Other Ranks – 212 people in total.

After setting up hospitals in Singapore, Tampoi in Johore Bahru, Malaya and then when pushed back by the advancing Japanese, again in Singapore, they were taken prisoner on 15 February 1942, within 6 months of departing Australia. They, and all other allied personnel, were then sent to Changi Prison and the AGH team soon became an annex of the British medical team in Roberts Barracks, part of the Changi POW Prison. As the Japanese didn't want to bog their battle hardened troops with guard duty of the ~50,000 Australian and British troops they left the command structures in place making the officers responsible for discipline, law and order. While many felt discipline and punishment was too harsh, the command structure gave flexibility and allowed the creation of Changi University and the AGH Rostrum Club at Changi.

A painting by Murray Griffin, Roberts Hospital Changi in 1943, now held in the Australian War Memorial illustrates the dire conditions for both patients and the AGH staff. Seriously ill battle casualties, many minus a limb, were quartered on the ground floor, the ambulant on the upper floors. The sewerage system was damaged and there was no water to flush anyway. Men with dysentery had to stagger down several flights of stairs to an outside pit latrine. This was a nightmare for those in the dysentery ward.

== Club formation ==
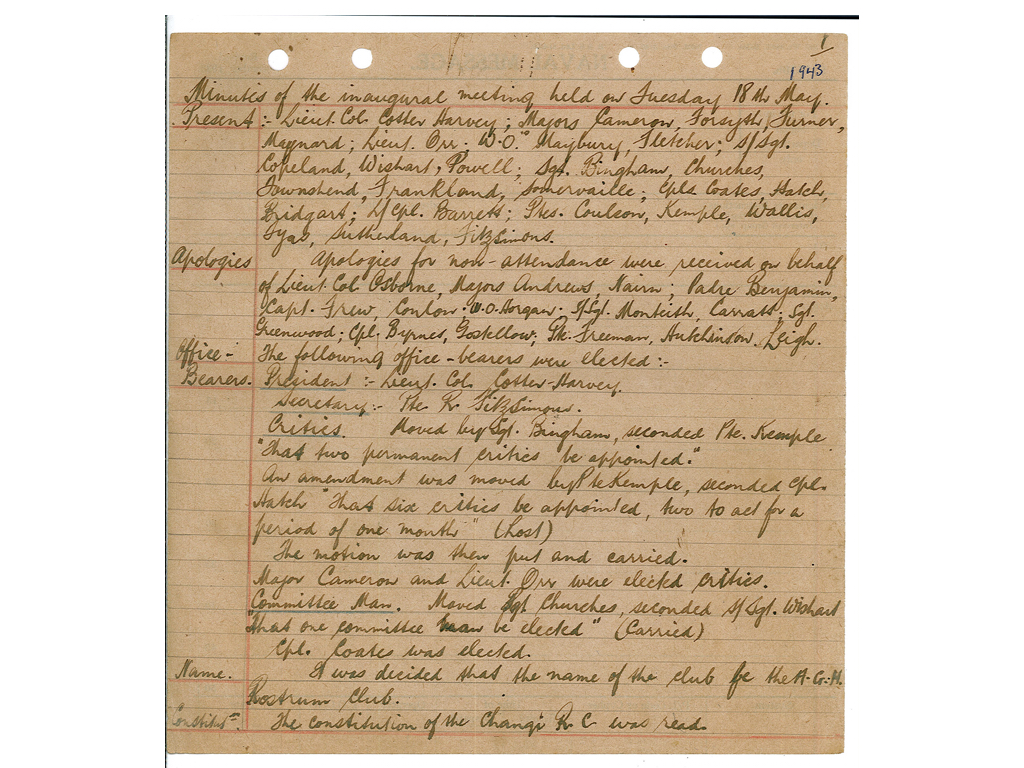
AGH Rostrum Changi Minutes of Inaugural Meeting 18 May 1943 - Page 1

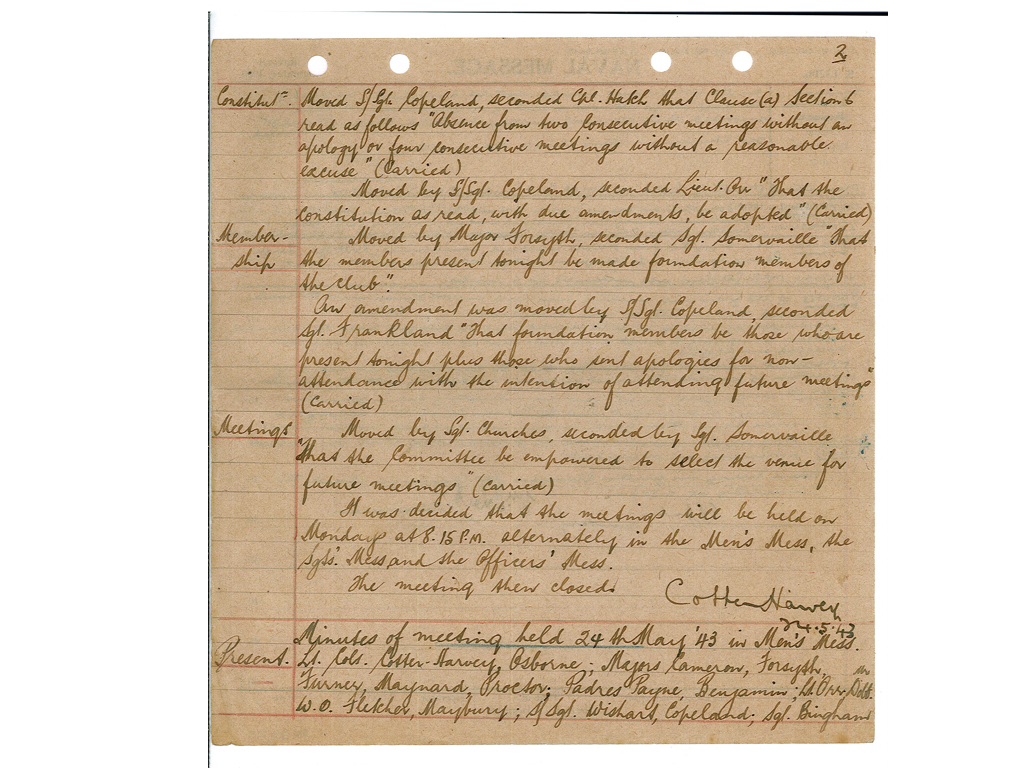
AGH Rostrum Changi Minutes of Inaugural Meeting 18 & 24 May 1943 - Page 2

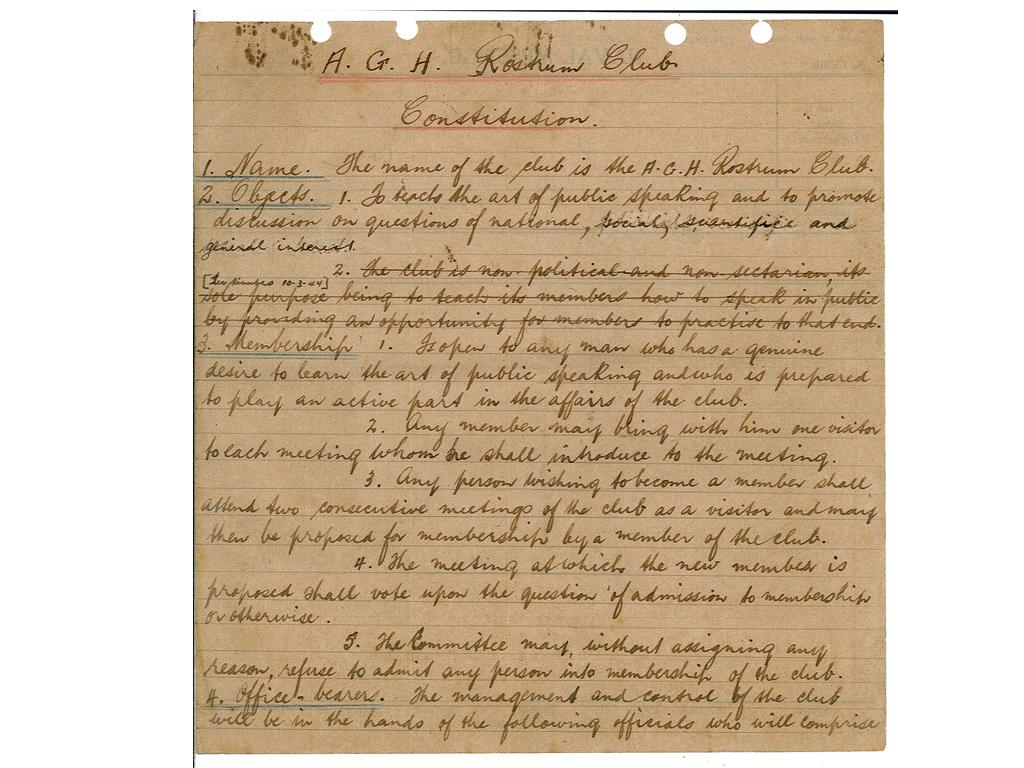
AGH Rostrum Constitution - Page 1

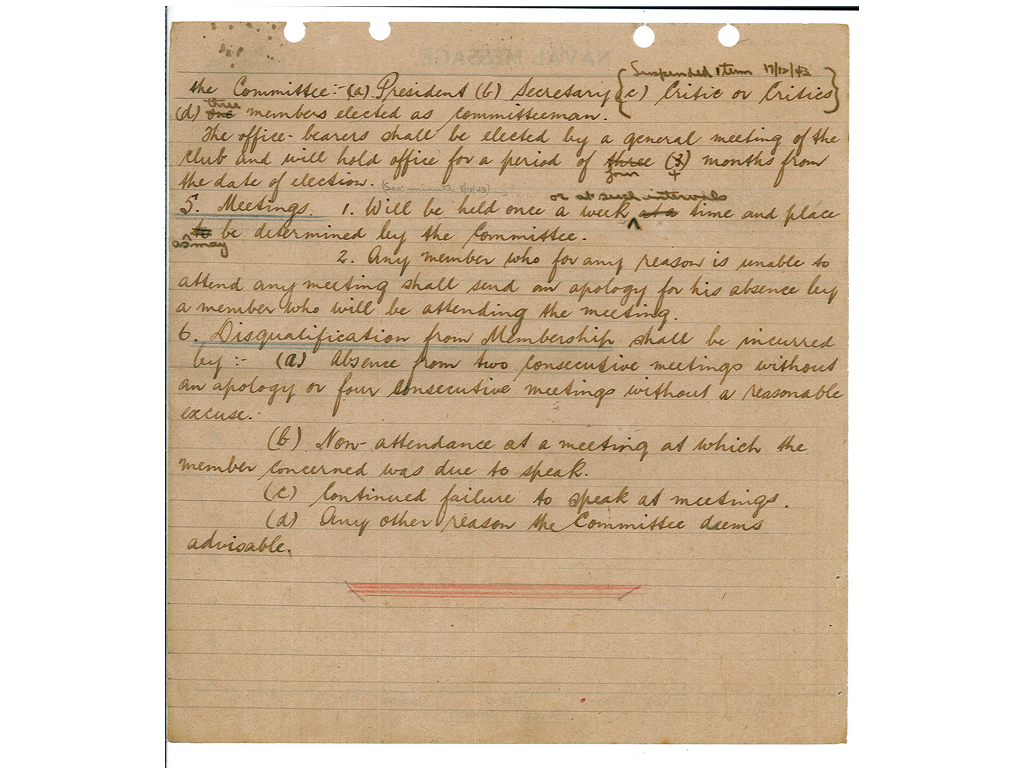
AGH Rostrum Constitution - Page 2

AGH Rostrum at Changi was formed at a public meeting of POWs on 18 May 1943 when the privations of their captivity was harming the health and morale of the POWs . A constitution was agreed, President, Secretary, Committeeman and Critics were elected and it was agreed to meet weekly on Mondays. Meetings were to be held alternatively in the Men's, Sergeant's and Officer's Messes. The Constitution used a number of elements of the Constitution of Australian Rostrum Clubs but was shorter and appropriate to their situation.

Club members military ranks ranged from Lieutenant Colonel at the top to Private at the bottom.

== Club operation ==
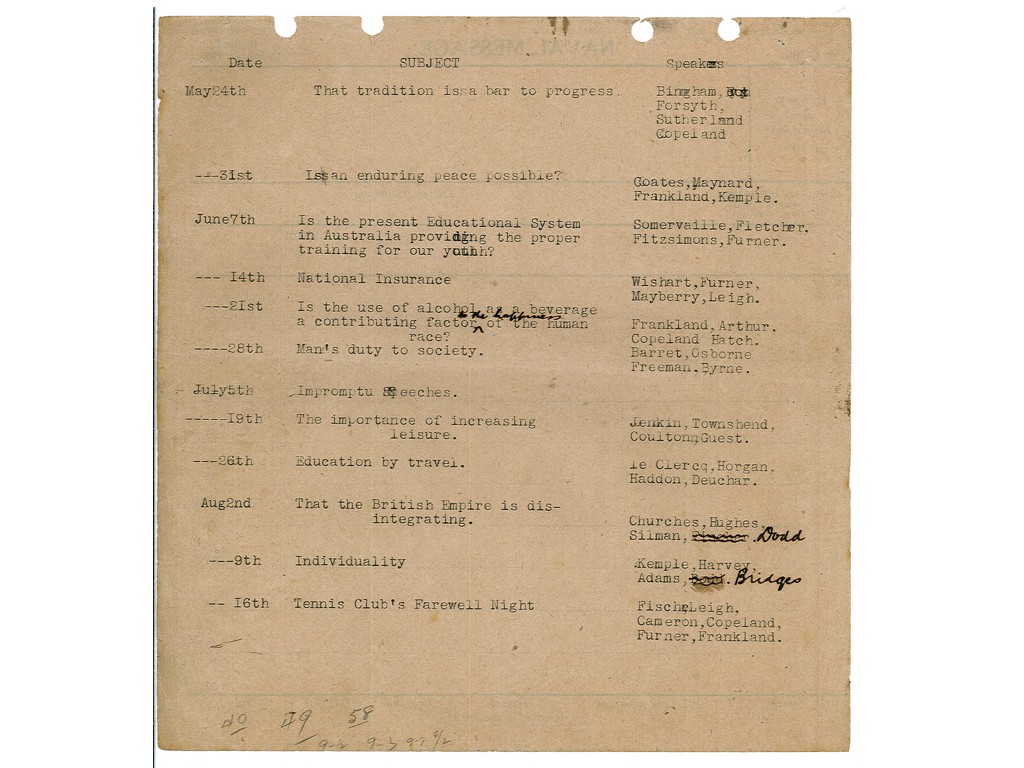
AGH Rostrum's First Speaking Program

The club developed a speaking program on a diverse range of topics including:

- The importance of increasing leisure;
- That the British Empire is disintegrating;
- Is the use of alcohol as a Beverage a constricting factor to the happiness of the human race;
- Preservation of Fauna in Australia.

As Rostrum is an organisation that promotes learning and building confidence in a supportive environment, the club's executive roles were initially rotated every three months. This was later changed to every four months.

The initial meeting elected two Critics. However this was later struck out and the membership record seems to indicate that this became a rotating role as occurs in Rostrum Clubs in Australia.

The amount of documentation produced in the camp is remarkable considering the scarcity of paper and supplies. It is notable that many of the AGH Changi documents are on reused or repurposed forms.

In March 1944 the second of the club's objects relating to being non-political and non-sectarian, was deleted from the Constitution.

=== Change with time ===
While there are only a few records of the club's activities, there are noticeable changes in the scope and tenor of the minutes.

Initially all members names are recorded, prefixed by their rank, and proceedings seemed more formal. There is a significant change in later meeting minutes where all members are recorded a Mister (Mr.) irrespective of rank. The other notable change is that minutes became briefer, with closer writing and use both sides of old military forms to maximise the use of available paper which was in short supply.

While the club was active, at least in 1943 and 1944, only a few sets of meeting minutes and programs have survived.

Club numbers were depleted as people were sent off with work parties to Malaya, Thailand and Burma. Visitors and new members are recorded over the period.

There is no record of the normal Rostrum Club maximum membership of 35 members being imposed at AGH Rostrum. While meeting attendance in the minutes we have was typically about 30 people, over 70 people are recorded as having some association with the club.

== AGH Rostrum Club records ==
The AGH Rostrum Club records displayed here were kept by T H (Bill) Hadden ( Service Number VX61667) and lodged with the Australian War Memorial. He is one of very few of the 15,000 Australian POWs at Changi who have material lodged with the Australian War Memorial.

Rostrum Clubs have advertised in veteran's magazines over the years for additional records of the AGH Rostrum Club but none have been found.

Hadden twice visited Changi from Australia. On the first visit he was refused entry as he didn't have the appropriate permits. On the second visit in December 1983, he was shown around prison which today is used as a training camp. Hadden died in Hong Kong on his way home to Australia.

== Membership ==
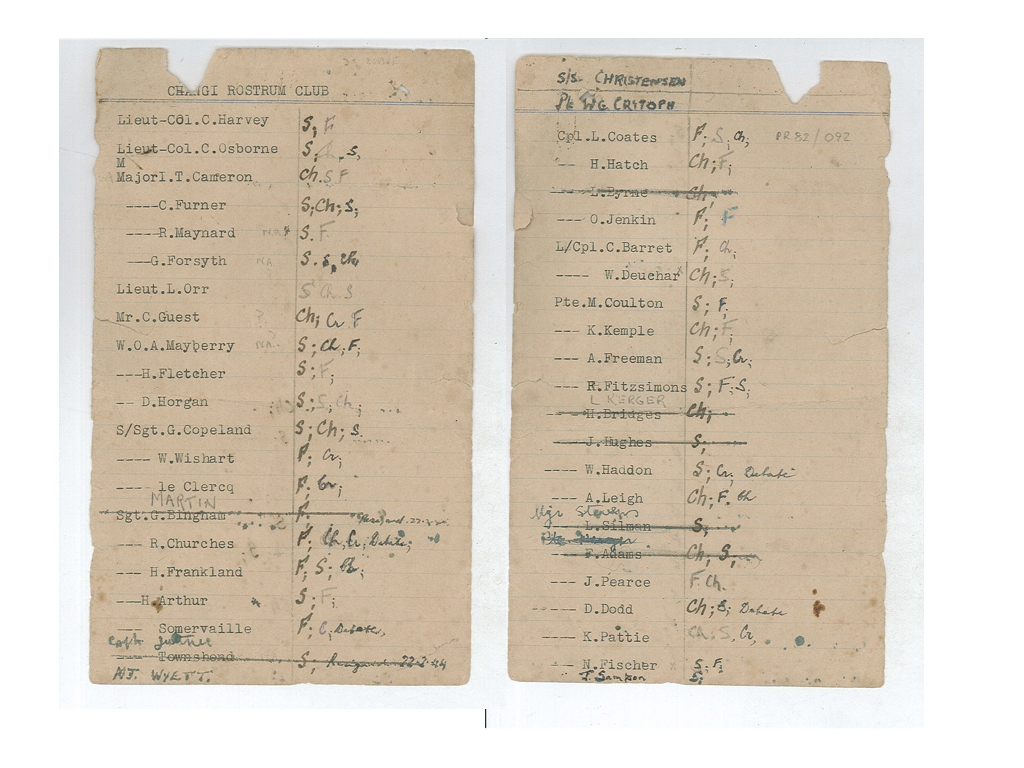
Members of AGH Rostrum Club at Changi showing roles performed, Ch = Chairman, S = Speaker, Cr = Critic

The founding members of the AGH Rostrum Club are:

Rank... Name... Military Number... Rostrum Role... Role / Company

- Lieut Colonel Cotter Harvey NX70668 President Senior physician
- Lieut Colonel Charles Osborn VX42966 Senior Surgen
- Major Forsyth VX42739 2/9 Field Ambulance
- Major Cameron Critic
- Major Turner
- Major Maynard
- Lieut Orr Critic
- Warrant Officer Maybury
- Warrant Officer Fletcher
- Staff Sergeant Copeland
- Staff Sergeant Wishart
- Staff Sergeant Powell
- Sergeant Bingham
- Sergeant Churches
- Sergeant Townsend
- Sergeant Frankland+
- Sergeant Somervaille
- Corporal Coates VX27533, Committee Man
- Corporal Hatch
- Corporal Bridges, VX46813 2/9 Field Ambulance
- Lance Corporal Barret
- Private Coulson
- Private Kemple+
- Private Wallis
- Private Tyas, NX8312 2/3 Motor Ambulance Convoy Malaya
- Private Sutherland, WX15967, 2/4th Machine Gun Battalion
- Private Fitzsimons, SX8983, Secretary 2/2 Reserve Motor Transport Company

+ These members are referred to in "POWs of Japan" article on the 13th Australian General Hospital.

In the limited set of minutes, programs and the membership list, that are available over 70 different people are recorded as participating in meetings.

The club may have had a civilian amongst its members. In the Membership list, a Mr. C Guest is listed amongst all the other members who have their rank prefixing their name. While it would be unusual to have a civilian in this part of the POW camp, it is possible a civilian was associated with the Roberts Hospital and was able to attend the AGH Rostrum meetings. While military rank was dropped in favour of "Mr" at club meetings this seems to have been done after this Membership list was compiled.

== Closure of AGH Rostrum Changi ==
It is not clear when AGH Rostrum Changi closed as there are no minutes or other information available to document the closure.

There are several dates that can be considered possible closure dates. These are:

- latest date for its closure would be the date of evacuation of POWs which took place on 13 September 1945 on the HMAHS Manunda.
- the earliest date may be indicated by last meeting minutes we have for AGH Rostrum is from 31 March 1944. While this could be the last meeting, it seems unlikely as there were 27 members present, apologies from 7 people and one new member, Mr Wyatt, was welcomed. The lack of later records may be a result of the Japanese confiscating paper, writing material and diaries in late 1944.
- some time between March 1944 and the surrender of Japan which was announced on 15 August and signed on 2 September. It could be imagined that with anticipation of going home in a short time that there was much preparation work to be done and there might not have been time for club meetings.

The use of POWs on work parties for the Japanese would have had an impact of AGH Rostrum members, some of which have been traced to work gangs on the notorious Thai-Burma Railway. POWs were dispatched to work camps in Malaya, Thailand, Burma and Sandakan. The initial group of 15,000 Australian POWs in 1942 was reduced to 2,500 by mid 1943, and grew to 5,000 by mid 1944.

Note: the POW Changi University operated for the duration of the war although it was at times severely constrained by available staff and students, the demand for people at the work camp, the smaller and smaller food rations as the war went on and a crack down by the Japanese guards who in late 1944 confiscated all paper and pencils. A number of diaries and other documents were saved by being buried in tin cans. Some documents held by the Australian War Memorial and in private hands have a musty smell as a result. This confiscation of documents also probably happened to the records of AGH Rostrum Club.
