= Simon Fraser University =

Public university in British Columbia, Canada

- Coat of arms
- Motto: Nous sommes prêts (French)
- Motto in English: We are ready
- Type: Public
- Established: 1965; 61 years ago
- Academic affiliations: ACU, CARL, CUSID, Universities Canada
- Endowment: CA$772 million (2025)
- Budget: CA$653 million (2022)
- Chancellor: Elio Luongo
- President: Joy Johnson
- Vice-Chancellor: Joy Johnson
- Faculty: 1,095
- Students: 22,543 (2024–25 FTE)
- Undergraduates: 25,690 (Fall 2022)
- Postgraduates: 4,690 (Fall 2022)
- Location: Greater Vancouver, British Columbia, Canada
- Campus: 3 (Burnaby, Surrey, Vancouver)
- Language: English
- Tagline: Canada's Engaged University
- Colours: Light red, dark red
- Nickname: Red Leafs
- Sporting affiliations: NCAA Division II – GNAC
- Mascot: Red Leafs
- Website: www.sfu.ca

Simon Fraser University (SFU) is a public research university in British Columbia, Canada. It maintains three campuses in Greater Vancouver, respectively located in Burnaby (main campus), Surrey, and Downtown Vancouver. The 170-hectare (420-acre) main Burnaby campus on Burnaby Mountain, located 15 kilometres (9.3 mi) from downtown Vancouver, was established in 1965 and comprises more than 37,000 students and 200,000 alumni. The university was created in an effort to expand higher education across Canada. In 2025, it became the first university in Canada to adopt university-wide open scholarship principles.

Simon Fraser University is a member of multiple national and international higher education associations, including the Association of Commonwealth Universities, International Association of Universities, and Universities Canada. SFU has also partnered with other universities and agencies to operate joint research facilities such as the TRIUMF, Canada's national laboratory for particle and nuclear physics, which houses the world's largest cyclotron, and Bamfield Marine Sciences Centre, a major centre for teaching and research in marine biology.

Undergraduate and graduate programs at SFU operate on a year-round, three-semester schedule. In 2015, SFU became the second Canadian university to receive accreditation from the Northwest Commission on Colleges and Universities.

== History ==
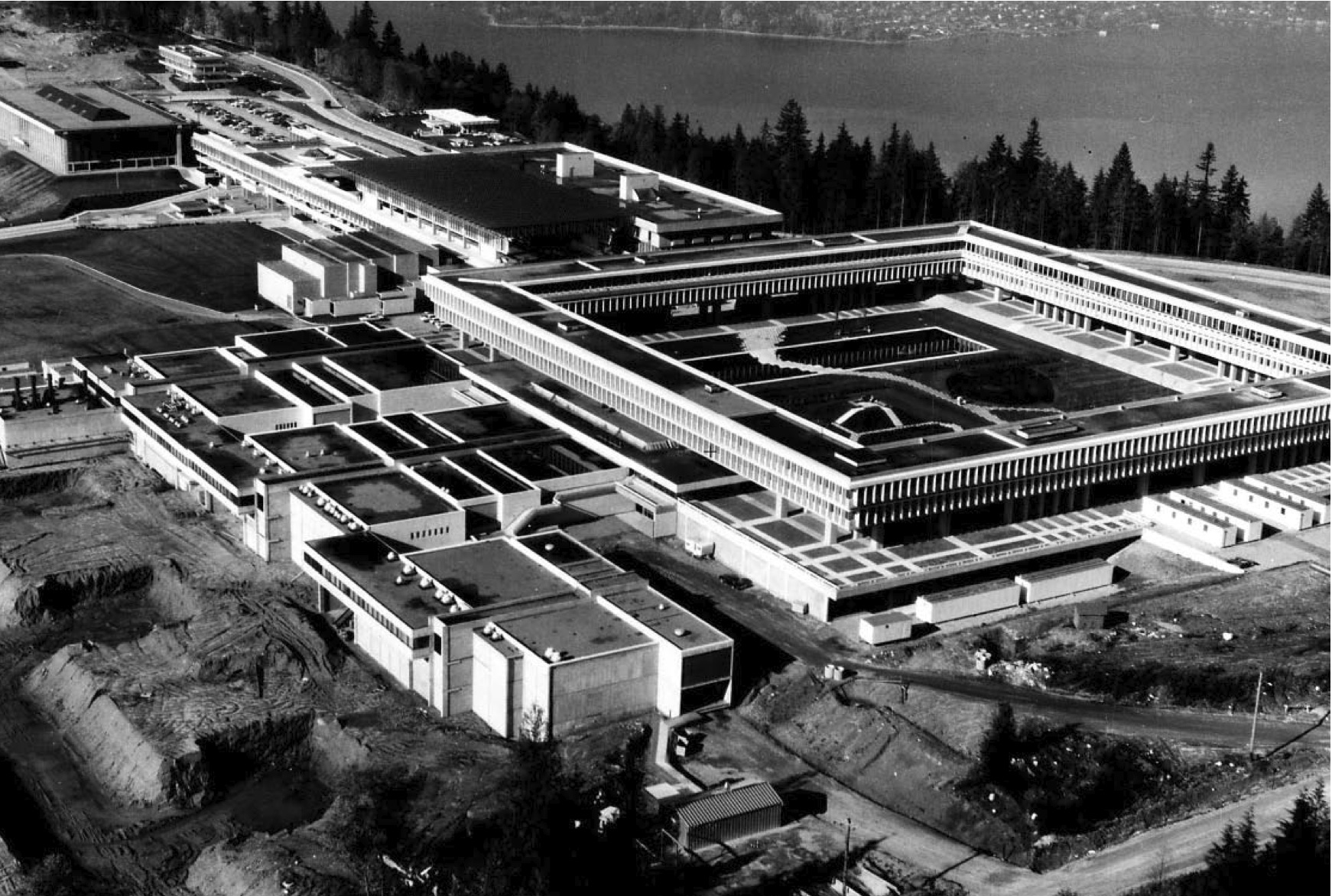
The newly constructed university in 1967, with the Academic Quadrangle as a centre of the campus

Simon Fraser University was founded upon the recommendation of a 1962 report entitled Higher Education in British Columbia and a Plan for the Future by John B. Macdonald. He recommended the creation of a new university in the Lower Mainland and the British Columbia Legislature gave formal assent on March 1, 1963, for the establishment of the university in Burnaby. The university was named after Simon Fraser, a North West Company fur trader and explorer. In May of the same year, Gordon M. Shrum was appointed as the university's first chancellor. From a variety of sites that were offered, Shrum recommended to the provincial government that the summit of Burnaby Mountain, 365 meters above sea level, be chosen for the new university. Architects Arthur Erickson and Geoffrey Massey won a competition to design the university, and construction began in the spring of 1964. The campus faces northwest over Burrard Inlet. Eighteen months later, on September 9, 1965, the university began its first semester with 2,500 students.

The campus was noted in the 1960s and early 1970s as a hotbed of political activism, culminating in a crisis in the Department of Political Science, Sociology, and Anthropology in a dispute involving ideological differences among faculty. The resolution to the crisis included the dismantling of the department into today's separate departments. During this time, Thelma Finlayson became the university's first female faculty member in the Department of Biological Sciences. She would later become their first professor emerita upon her retirement in 1979.

=== 21st century ===
In 2007, the university began offering dual and double degree programs by partnering with international universities, such as a dual computing-science degree through partnership with Zhejiang University in China and a double Bachelor of Arts degree in conjunction with Australia's Monash University. It has also partnered with India's IIT Bombay.

In 2009, SFU became the first Canadian university to be accepted into the National Collegiate Athletic Association (NCAA). Starting in the 2011–2012 season, SFU competed in the NCAA's Division II Great Northwest Athletic Conference (GNAC) and has now transitioned all 19 Simon Fraser teams into the NCAA. In November 2025 the school announced it would leave the NCAA and join U Sports stating that them continuing to compete in the NCAA was unsustainable due to financial and logistical restraints.

On September 9, 2015, SFU celebrated its 50th anniversary. Over its 50 years, the university educated over 130,000 graduates.

A breach of SFU's systems in February 2020 exposed the records of 250,000 students. A second attack in February 2021 resulted in the exposure of 200,000 records. A class action lawsuit was filed against SFU in March 2021.

In early 2022, Burnaby City Council announced they would officially support the SFU Gondola as part of the TransLink expansion project. This is included in the Mayors' Council's approval of the Transport 2050 regional transportation strategy announcement.

In early 2025, SFU's School of Interactive Arts and Technology debuted their Virtual Ambassador Program, hailed as "the world's first official university VTubers".

== Campuses ==
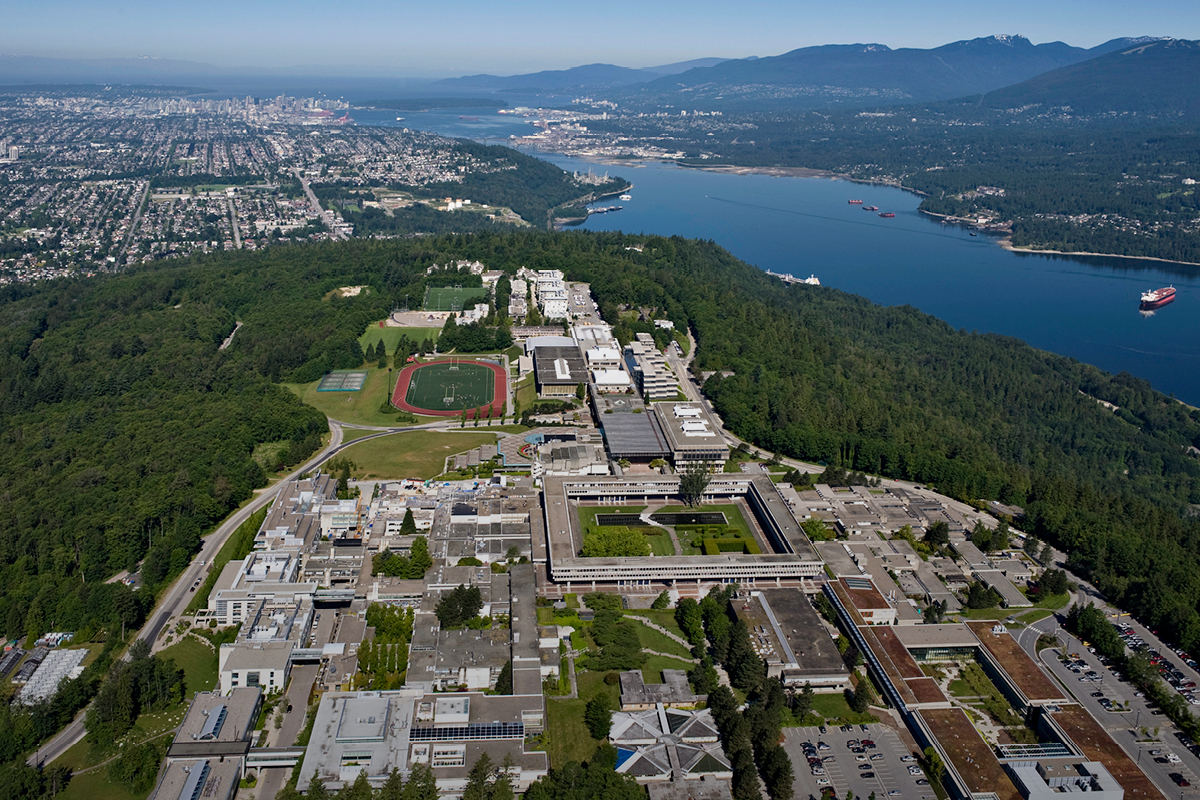
Aerial view of the Burnaby Mountain Campus

Simon Fraser University has three campuses, each located in different parts of Greater Vancouver. SFU's original campus is located in Burnaby, atop Burnaby Mountain. The Vancouver campus consists of multiple buildings in downtown Vancouver and the Surrey campus is located inside Central City.

The downtown campus has expanded to include several other buildings in recent years, including the Segal Graduate School of Business. In September 2010, the SFU School for the Contemporary Arts moved into the Woodward's redevelopment, known as the Goldcorp Centre for the Arts.

SFU's three campuses are all accessible by public transit. The Vancouver campus is a block away from the Waterfront SkyTrain station while the Surrey campus is adjacent to the Surrey Central SkyTrain station. The Burnaby campus is linked to the Production Way–University, Burquitlam, and Sperling–Burnaby Lake SkyTrain stations by frequent shuttle bus service.

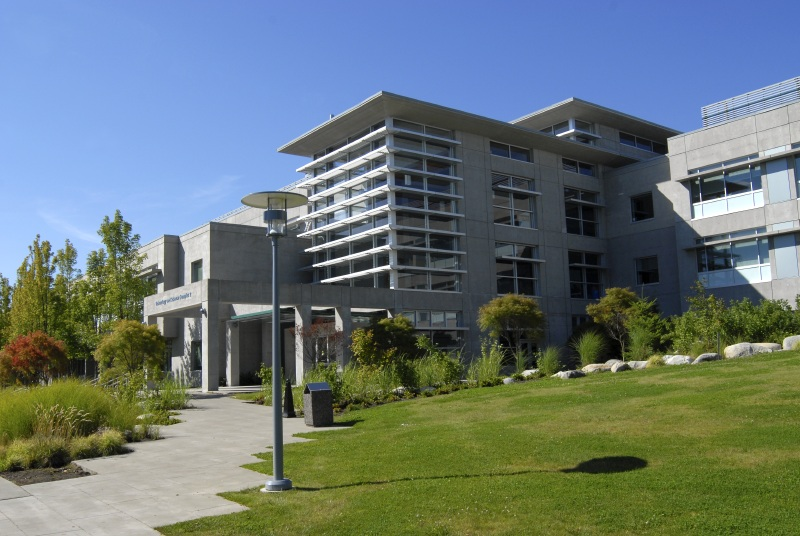
Technology and Science Complex 2 (TASC 2), housing major research laboratories and offices

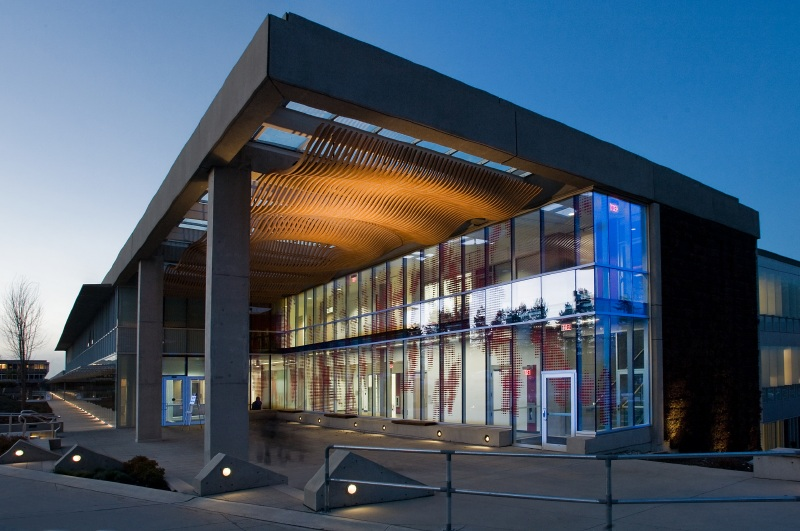
Blusson Hall, containing the Faculty of Health Sciences

=== Burnaby campus ===
The Academic Quadrangle at the Burnaby Mountain Campus with the jade boulder in the foreground

The Academic Quadrangle Gardens

The main campus is located atop Burnaby Mountain, on Traditional Coast Salish Lands, including the Tsleil-Waututh (səl̓ilw̓ətaɬ), Kwikwetlem (kʷikʷəƛ̓əm), Squamish (Sḵwx̱wú7mesh Úxwumixw) and Musqueam (xʷməθkʷəy̓əm) Nations. The campus is at an elevation of 365 metres, overlooking the Burrard inlet to the north. All major departments in the university are housed at the Burnaby campus. The library on the main campus is called the W. A. C. Bennett Library, named after the Social Credit Premier of B.C. who established it. The campus also has two gym complexes, named the Lorne-Davies Complex and Chancellor's Gym. An international-sized swimming pool is located within the Lorne-Davies Complex. Since the School for the Contemporary Arts relocation to the Woodward's location, the Burnaby campus production theatre has been vacant. Located within the heart of the campus are the Museum of Archaeology and Ethnology and three art galleries. The campus has been awarded numerous architectural awards over the years, including the gold medal for Lieutenant-Governor 2009 Awards in Architecture and the 2007 Royal Architectural Institute of Canada's Prix du XXe siècle.

The Burnaby campus is composed of a vast complex of interconnected buildings spanning across 170 hectares (420 acres) of land on Burnaby Mountain, from the eastern end of the campus to the western side, where the UniverCity urban village is located. The campus consists of the following buildings:

- West Mall Complex (WMC)
- Lorne Davies Gym Complex
- Chancellor's Gym Complex
- Convocation Mall
- W. A. C. Bennett Library
- Halpern Centre
- Maggie Benston Centre (MBC)
- Leslie & Gordon Diamond Family Auditorium
- Gym, Pool, Fitness Centre
- Robert C. Brown Hall (RCB)
- Academic Quadrangle (AQ)
- Shrum Science Centre (SSC)
  - SSC Biology (B)
  - SSC Biomedical Physiology and Kinesiology (K)
  - SSC Chemistry (C)
  - SSC Physics (P)
- South Science Building (SSB)
- Applied Sciences Building (ASB)
- Education Building (EB)
- Technology and Science Complex (TASC) I
- Technology and Science Complex (TASC) II
  - 4D LABS
- Blusson Hall (BLU)
- Saywell Hall (ASSC)
- Strand Hall
- Trottier Observatory and Science Courtyard
- Student Union Building (SUB)
- First Peoples’ Gathering House
- Marianne and Edward Gibson Art Museum

Due to the contemporary Brutalist architecture of the Burnaby Mountain campus, many buildings, including the WAC Bennett Library and Academic Quadrangle have been used for location shots in various films and television programmes over the years.

==== Library, archives, museums and galleries ====
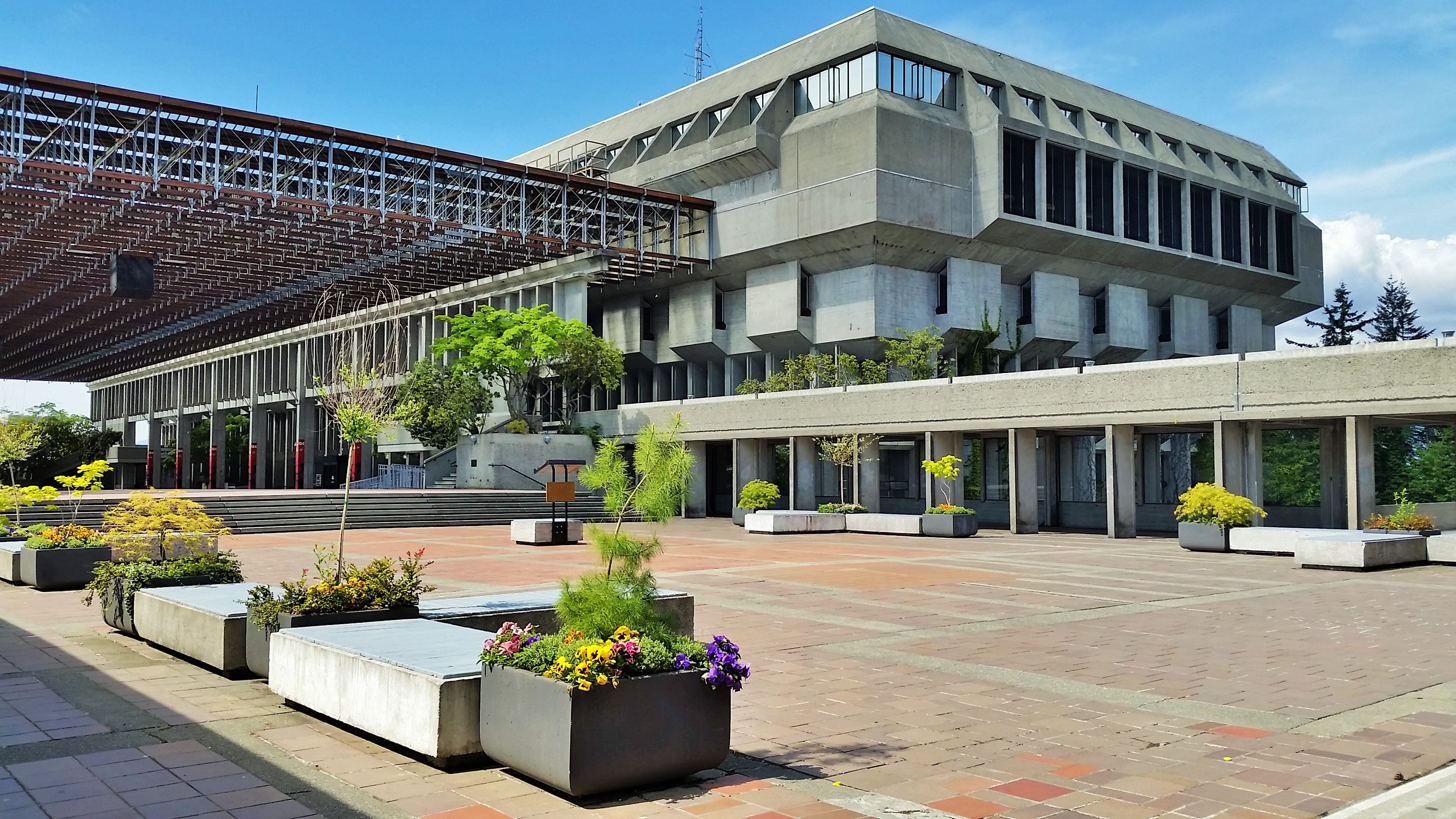
W.A.C. Bennett Library

Each campus has its own library, the largest of which is the W.A.C. Bennett Library based on the SFU Burnaby campus, which holds over 2.7 million print and microform volumes.

SFU also has a Museum of Archeology and Ethnology, which holds many exhibits created by students as part of the museum studies courses offered in the Department of Archaeology. Archaeological collections arising from excavations and other research by faculty, staff and students are housed in the museum. Several large wooden sculptures ('totem') poles from the Royal British Columbia Museum in Victoria represent the major art traditions of the indigenous coastal peoples of British Columbia. The museum holds an extensive collection of Indonesian wayang kulit shadow puppets and ethnographic objects from around the world. The museum's image collection holds over 120,000 35 mm slides and digital images of archaeological and ethnographic interest.

The SFU Library's Digital Collections provide internet access to digitized documents from a number of archival collections, such as Harrison Brown's Xi'an Incident collection, and the history of British Columbia and Western Canada in general, including documents from the Doukhobor migration from the Russian Empire to Saskatchewan and then to British Columbia assembled for donation to the university by John Keenlyside. Other highlights of the collection include The Vancouver Punk Collection, which includes more than 1200 posters as well as photographs, zines, and ephemera, the British Columbia Postcards Collection, and more than 9800 editorial cartoons from Canadian newspapers.

Simon Fraser University's art galleries include: SFU Gallery on the Burnaby campus (established 1970), Audain Gallery at the Goldcorp Centre for the Arts in Vancouver (established 2010), and Teck Gallery at Harbour Centre in Vancouver (established 1989). SFU Galleries stewards the Simon Fraser University Art Collection, which includes, in its holdings of over 5,500 works, significant regional and national artworks spanning the last century.

The Bill Reid Centre for Northwest Coast Art Studies at SFU houses a collection of 50,000 objects, primarily digital images and digitized textual documents, which document the art, culture and history of different First Nations cultures of the Northwest Coast. The collection includes explorers' drawings, sketches, paintings and original photography.

==== Residences ====
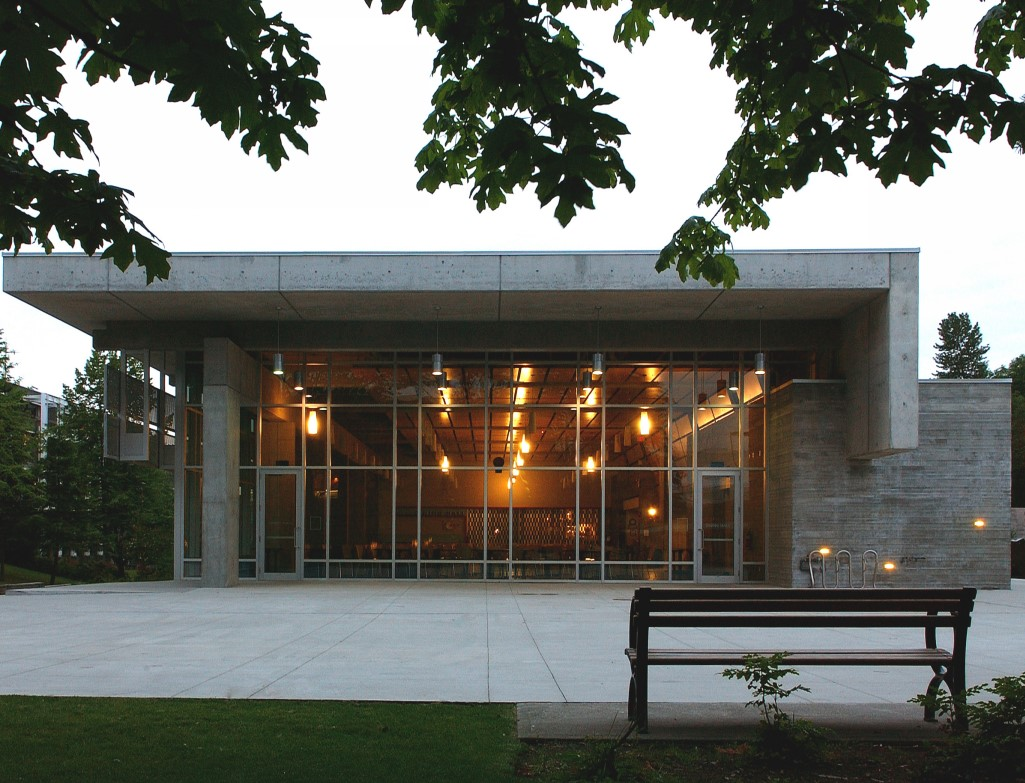
SFU Dining Commons, opened in September 2022

The SFU Burnaby campus provides residence to 1766 SFU and FIC students in six different areas, all located on the western side of the campus.

- The Towers (officially opened in fall of 2004) are three dormitory-style buildings. One of the Towers features a 14-room hotel called "The Simon Hotel".
- McTaggart-Cowan Hall (built in 1985), a traditional-style dormitory building.
- Shell House (built in 1967), traditional-style dormitory building.
- The Townhouse Complex (built in 1993) are 3-level townhouse units accommodating up to 4 students per unit. There are a total of 99 units.
- Hamilton Hall (built in 1993 and renovated in 2009) is a studio-style building for graduate students.
- Louis Riel House (built in 1969 and closed in 2015) was an apartment-style building (unfurnished) used for family and graduate housing. Although the residents tried to prevent the building's closure, it officially closed in September 2015, due to mould problems.

==== UniverCity ====
UniverCity is an urban community located on top of Burnaby Mountain, adjacent to Simon Fraser University. It has won several awards for sustainable planning and development. Envisioned in 1963 by Arthur Erickson and Geoffrey Massey, the area adjacent to the university was not officially rezoned for development until 30 years later. Development of the community began in early 2000, when Simon Fraser University commenced construction on a new residential and commercial area occupying approximately 81 hectares (200 acres) adjacent to the campus. As of September 2011, approximately 3000 people live in UniverCity. The main commercial district on University High Street now houses restaurants, stores, and a 20,000 square foot Nester's Market. A new elementary school, University Highlands Elementary, opened on September 1, 2010. Several new residential developments are currently in progress, including the construction of a 12-storey high rise in the heart of UniverCity.

=== Surrey campus ===
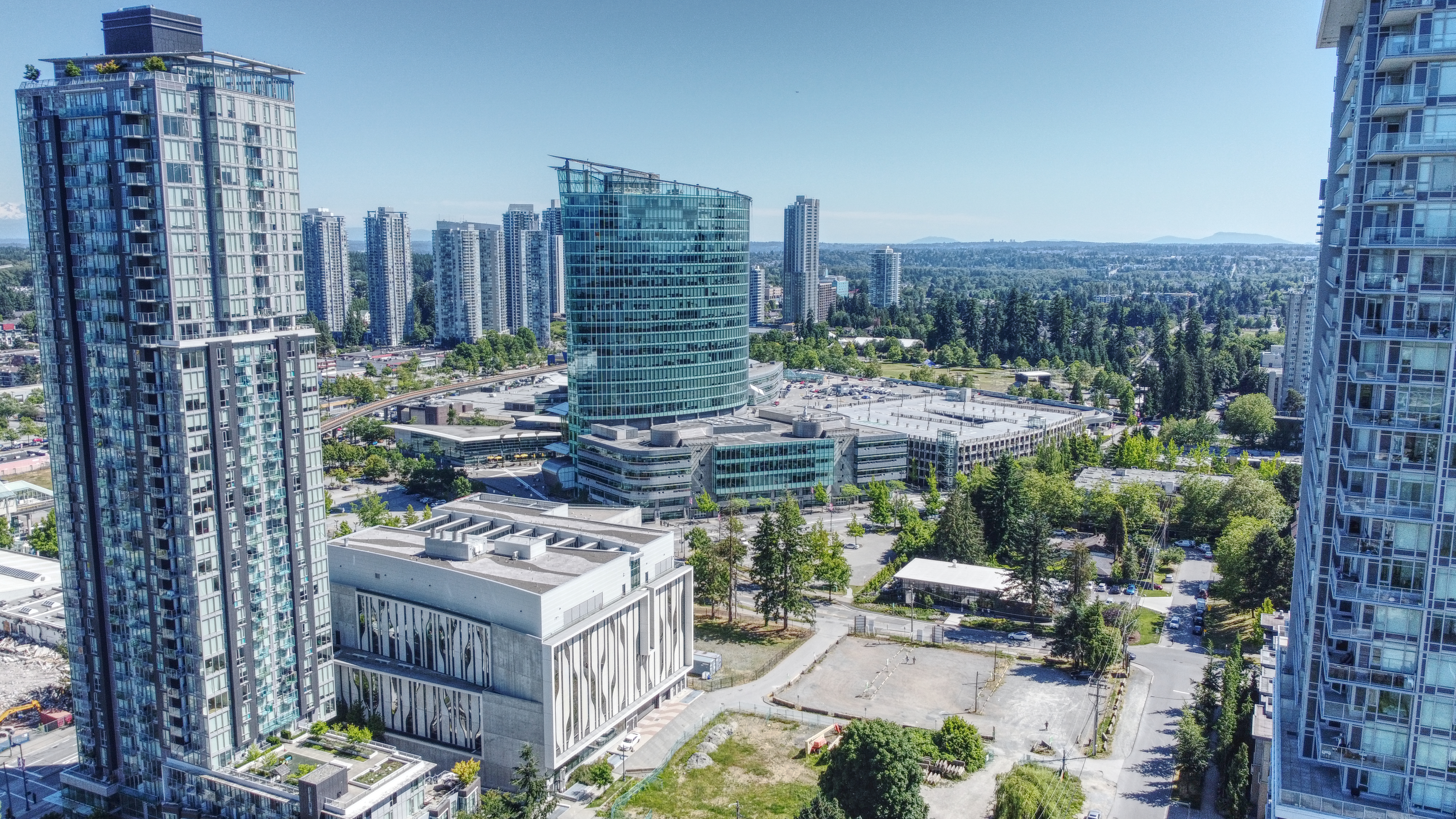
Aerial view of the Surrey Campus.

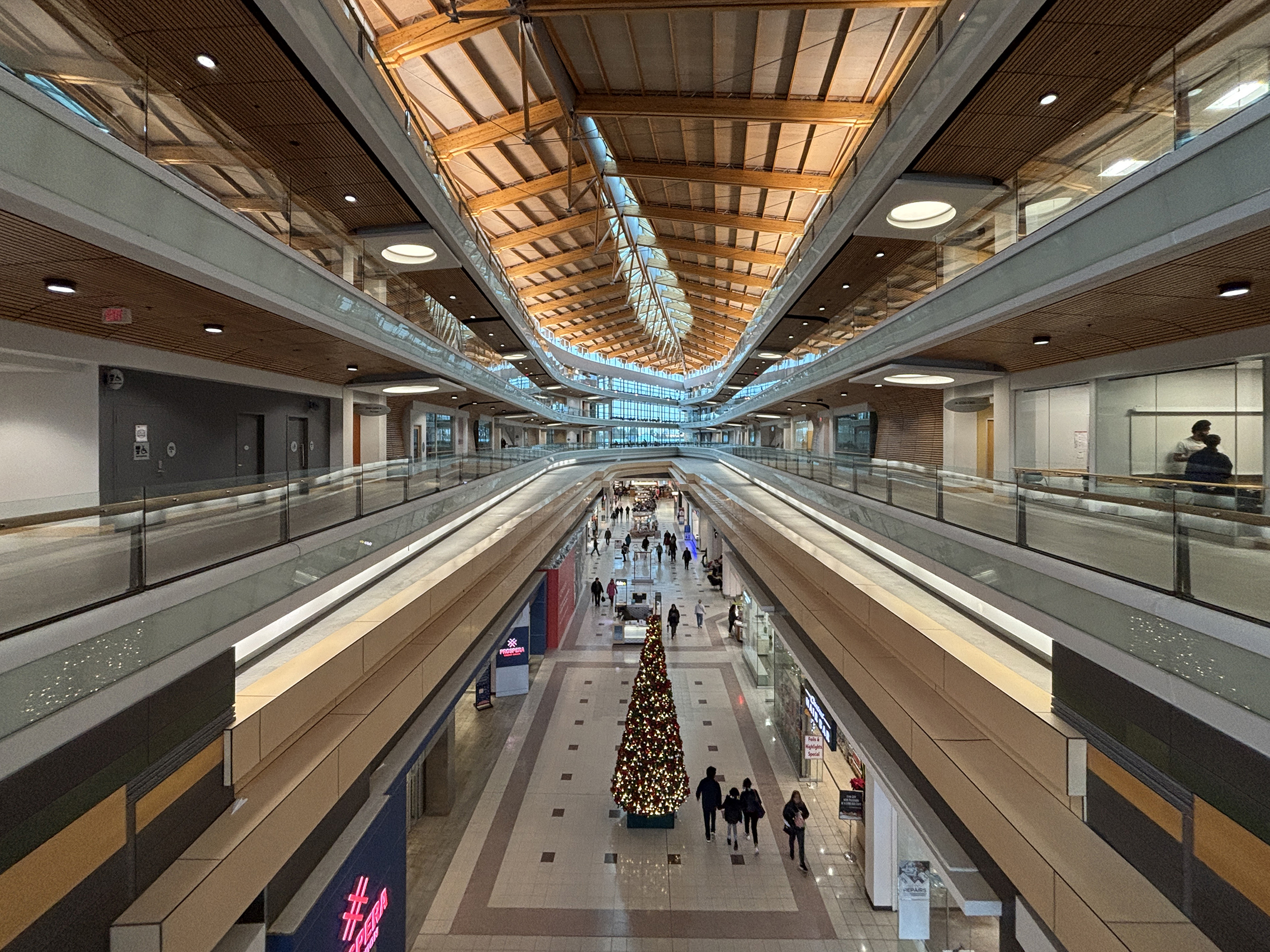
The interior of the main Surrey campus building.

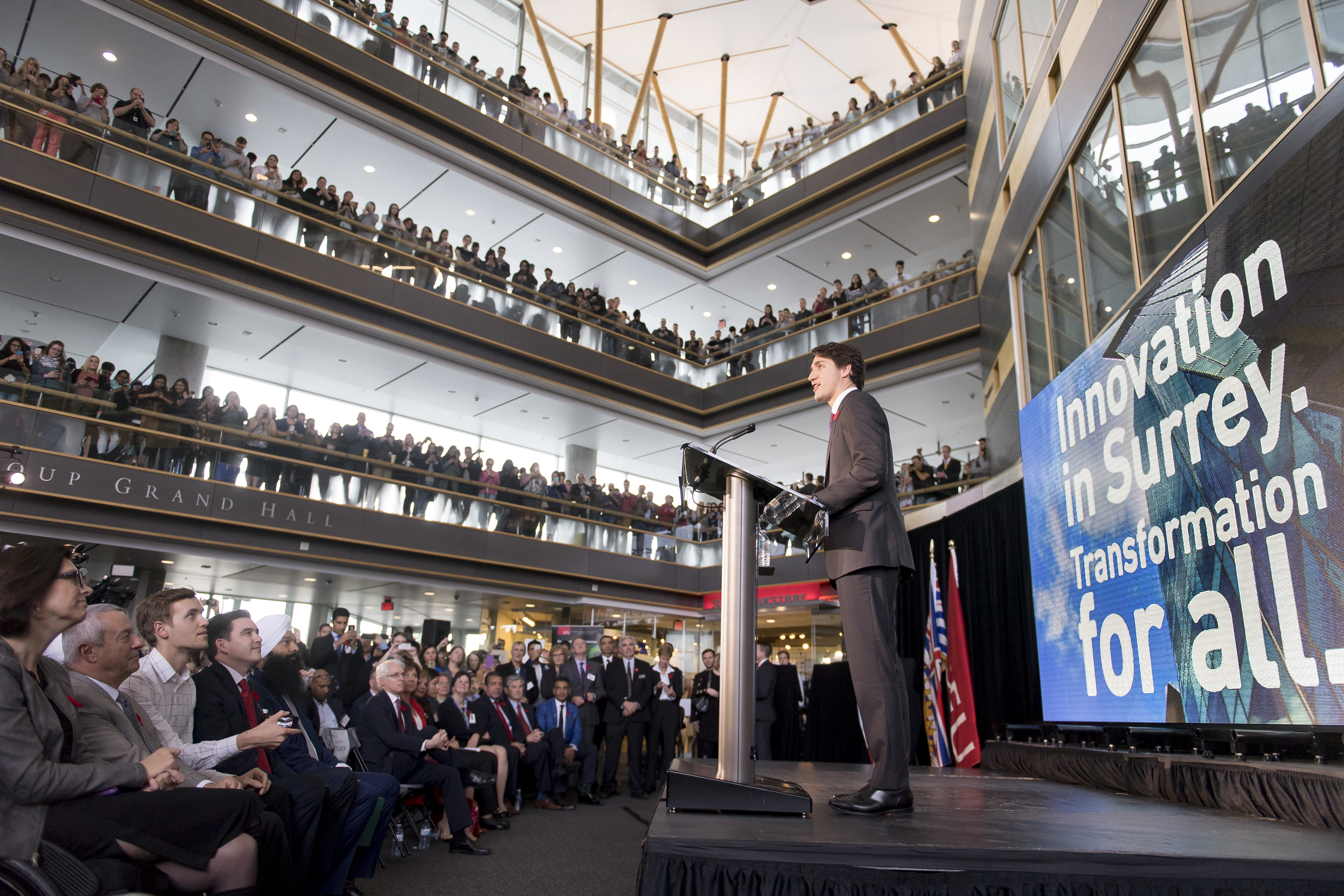
Prime Minister Justin Trudeau announcing an expansion to the Surrey Campus in 2016.

The Surrey campus consists of two buildings located in the City Centre of Surrey. The main building is part of Central City, an architectural complex adjacent to the Surrey Central SkyTrain station. It was established in 2002 to absorb the students and programs of the former Technical University of British Columbia, which was closed by the provincial government. It has since expanded to house the Surrey operations of other SFU programs. The Central City complex that houses the campus was designed by architect Bing Thom and opened in 2006. The Fraser Library, a branch of the SFU Library, is located at the second floor on this campus and is the only branch with a games room, where arcade games and console games are available. It also loans equipment to students in the School of Interactive Arts and Technology (SIAT), also located on the Surrey Campus. SIAT facilities include a prototyping lab, editing suites, and a motion capture studio, the latter of which became the facility from which the Virtual Ambassador program is run.

A separate five-floor building opened on April 25, 2019, across the street from the existing Central City complex. The 20,458-square-metre (220,210 sq ft) building is LEED Gold certified and mainly houses the Sustainability Energy Engineering (SEE) program and supports 440 full-time students with engineering labs, computer labs, classrooms, lecture halls and office spaces.

=== Vancouver campus ===
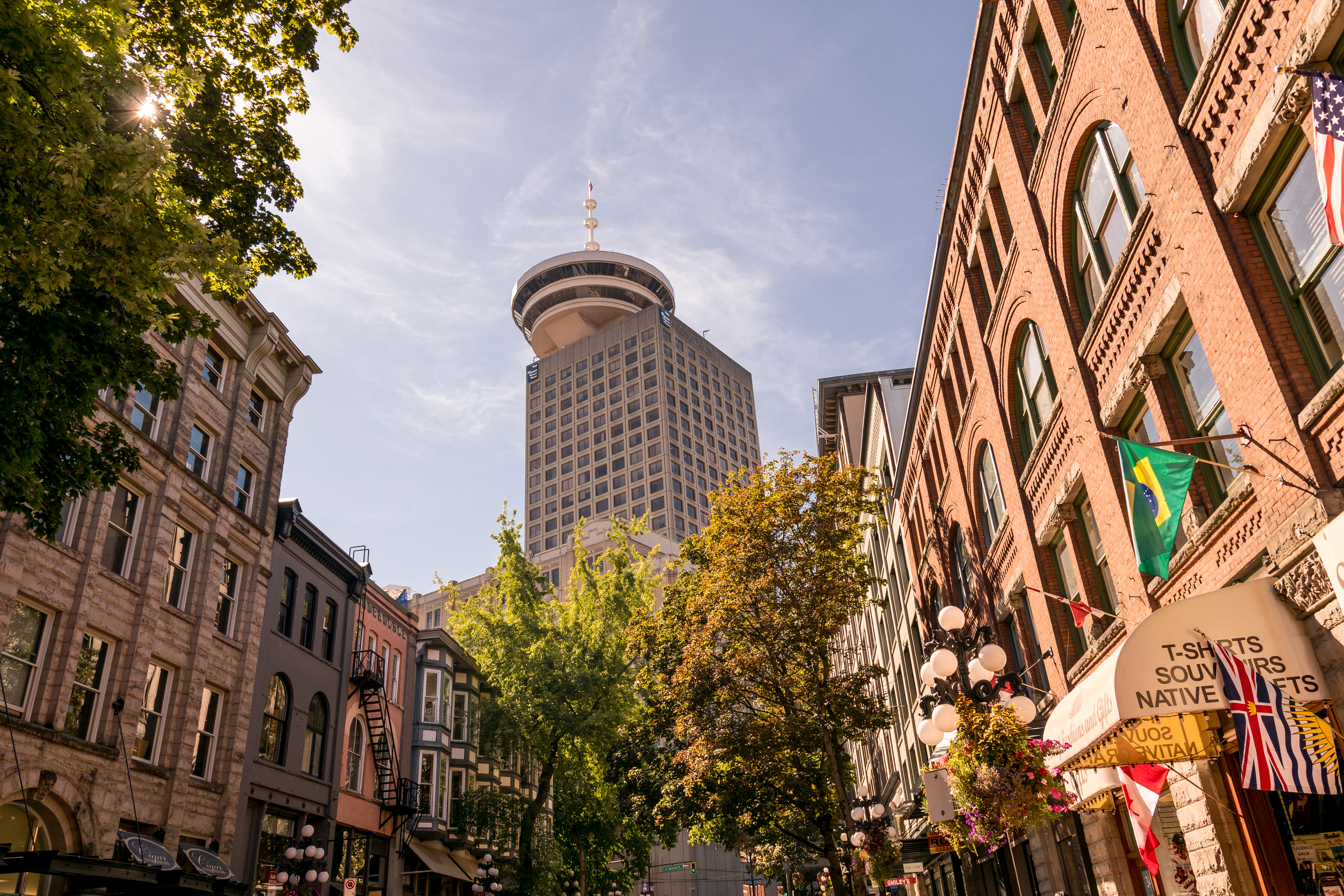
The School of International Studies is housed within Harbour Centre.

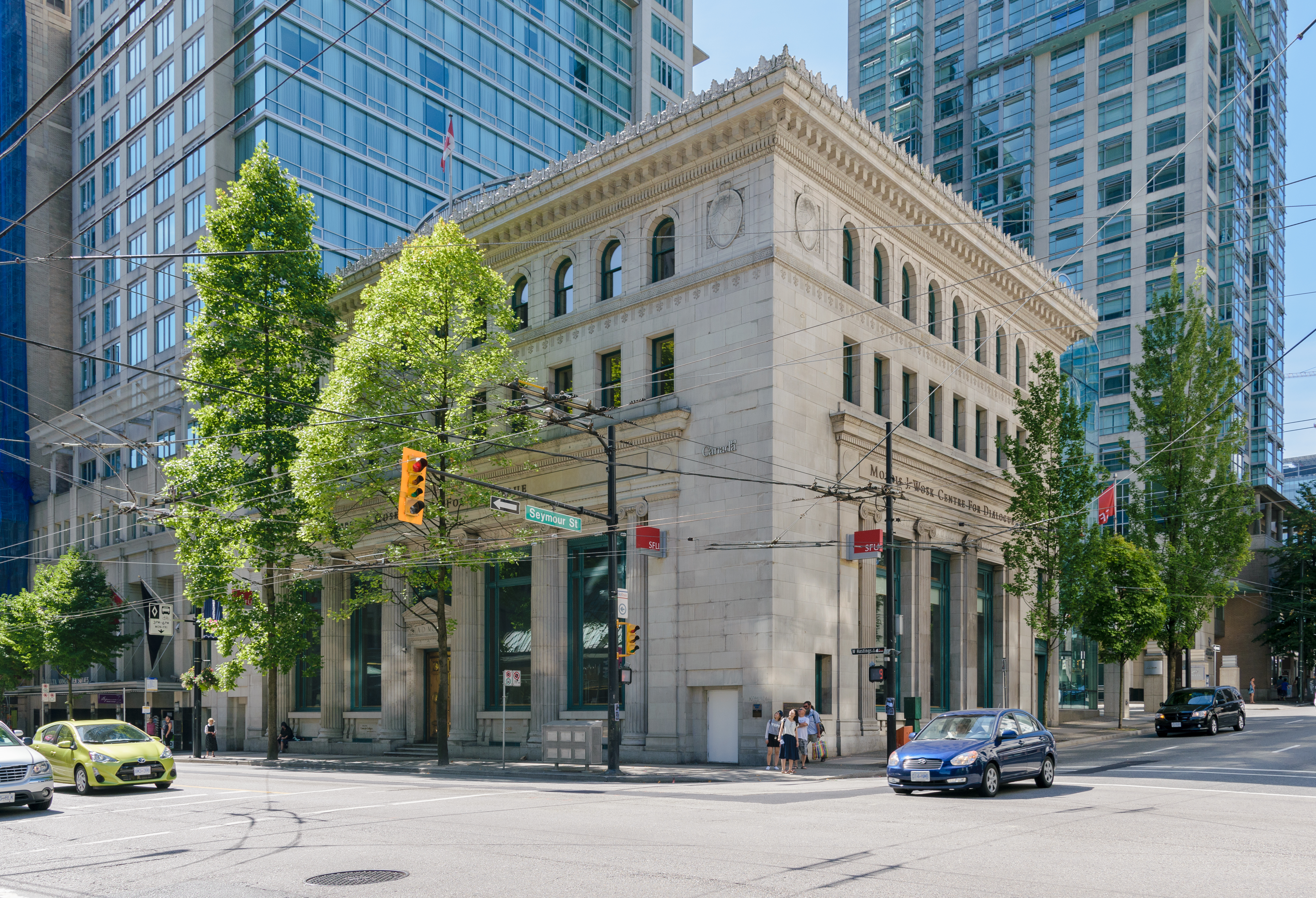
Morris J. Wosk Centre for Dialogue, part of Simon Fraser University's Vancouver campus

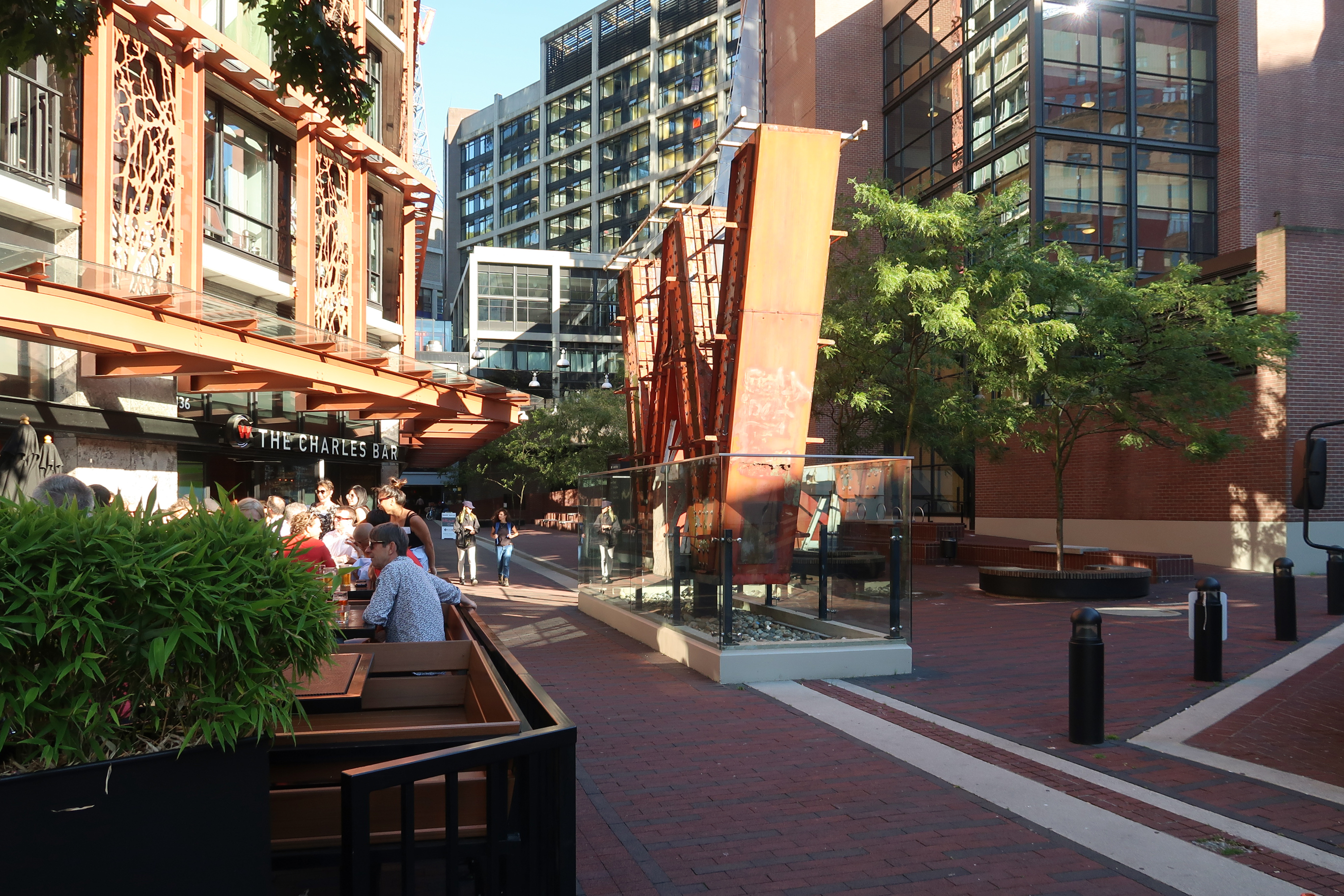
The School for the Contemporary Arts within the Woodward's Building

The Vancouver campus was launched in the 1980s with a storefront classroom. It was the first urban university classroom in British Columbia. A significant portion of funding for the building of the campus came from the private sector. The Vancouver campus has eight buildings spread across the downtown core: SFU Harbour Centre, the Morris J. Wosk Centre for Dialogue, the Segal Graduate School of Business, SFU School for the Contemporary Arts at the restored Woodward's Building, SFU Charles Chang Innovation Centre, SFU Vancity Office of Community Engagement at 312 Main, SFU VentureLabs, SFU Collection at Bill Reid Gallery of Northwest Coast Art, and SFU Contemporary Arts at 611 Alexander Visual Arts Studio. The original campus building at Harbour Centre, a rebuilt heritage department store, officially opened on May 5, 1989. Today, the entire campus serves more than 70,000 people annually. Approximately 10,000 are graduate and undergraduate students enrolled in courses and degree programs based downtown. The Belzberg Library is based at the Vancouver campus.

In September 2010, the SFU School for the Contemporary Arts relocated to the historic Woodward's district in downtown Vancouver known as the Goldcorp Centre for the Arts. The 130,000-square-foot (12,077 m^{2}) SFU facility is part of the Woodward's revitalization project. The new facility accommodates the increasing enrolment of students in the program and new cultural facilities, including the Fei and Milton Wong Experimental theatre, screening rooms, sound studios, and art galleries.

== Governance ==
The university is governed in accordance with the British Columbia University Act.

=== Convocation ===
The convocation is composed of all faculty members, senators, and graduates (degree holders, including honorary alumni) of the university. Its main function is to elect the 4 convocation senators. Convocation ceremonies are held twice annually to confer degrees (including honorary degrees) as well as award diplomas and certificates.

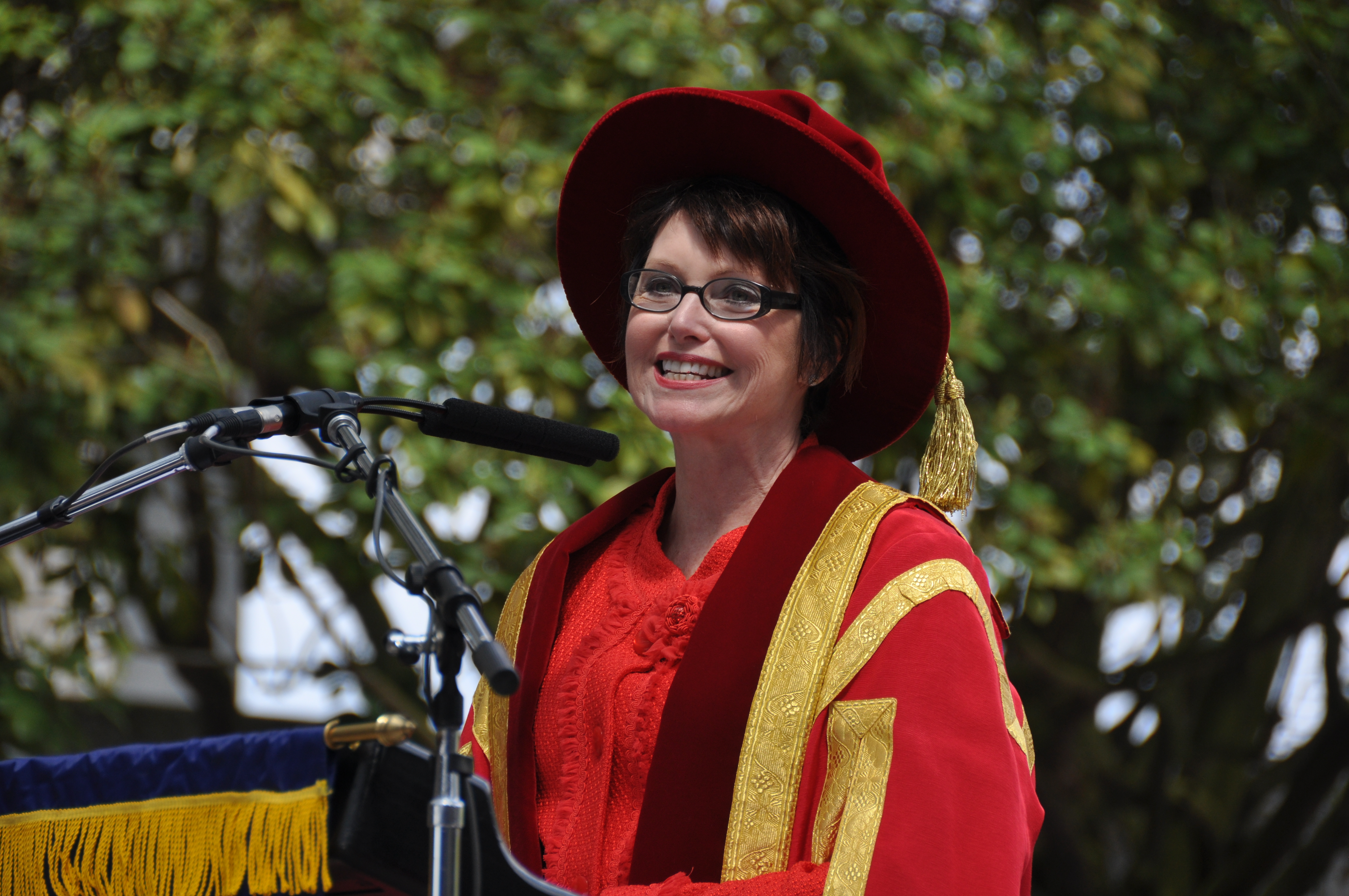
Carole Taylor, the tenth chancellor of Simon Fraser University

=== Board of governors ===
The board is composed of the chancellor, the president, two student members, two faculty members, one staff member, and eight individuals appointed by the British Columbia government. Conventionally, the board is chaired by one of the government appointees. The board is responsible for the general management and governance of the university.

Board members as of 2026:

- Carol Herbert, board chair, order-in-council
- Elio Luongo, O.B.C., chancellor
- Joy Johnson, president
- Monique Pongracic-Speier, deputy chair, order-in-council
- Evan Accettola, graduate student member
- Ms. Naz Babaeipanah, staff member
- Ms. Kamal Basra, alumni, order-in-council
- Mark Collard, faculty member
- Susan Erikson, faculty member
- Aidan Gough, undergraduate student member
- Carolyn Hanna, staff member
- Linda Li, order-in-council
- Peter Mehling, order-in-council
- Neelam Sahota, order-in-council
- Christine Stahler, order-in-council
- Raphael Tachie, alumni order-in-council

=== Senate ===
The senate is composed of the chancellor, the president, vice-president, academic, associate vice-president, academic, associate vice-president, learning and teaching, vice-president, research, deans of faculties, dean of graduate studies, dean of lifelong learning, dean of libraries, registrar (as senate secretary), 18 student members, 36 faculty members, and four convocation members (who are not faculty members). The senate is chaired by the president. The academic governance of the university is vested in the senate.

=== Chancellor ===
Prior to 2008, the chancellor is elected by and from the convocation. After an amendment to the University Act in 2008, the chancellor is appointed by the board of governors on nomination by the alumni association and after consultation with the senate for a three-year term, which can be renewed once. The main responsibilities of the chancellor are to confer degrees and represent the university in formal functions.

- Gordon M. Shrum (January 1, 1964 – May 31, 1968)
- Kenneth P. Caple (June 1, 1968 – May 31, 1975)
- Jack Diamond (June 1, 1975 – May 31, 1978)
- Paul T. Cote (June 1, 1978 – June 15, 1984)
- William M. Hamilton (June 15, 1984 – May 31, 1987)
- Barbara J. Rae (June 5, 1987 – June 4, 1993)
- Joseph Segal (June 5, 1993 – June 4, 1999)
- Milton Wong (June 5, 1999 – May 31, 2005)
- Brandt Louie (June 1, 2005 – June 17, 2011)
- Carole Taylor (June 17, 2011 – June 13, 2014)
- Anne Giardini (June 13, 2014 – June 13, 2020)
- Tamara Vrooman (June 13, 2020 – June 12, 2026)
- Elio Luongo (June 12, 2026 to present)

=== President and vice-chancellor ===
The board of governors appoints the president and vice-chancellor based on a selection process jointly established by the board of governors and the university's senate. As the chief executive officer and chair of the senate, the president is responsible for the day-to-day administration of the university.

The last president that was appointed was Joy Johnson, who began her term on September 1, 2020. Johnson succeeded Andrew Petter, who held a decade-long post as president from 2010 to 2020. Johnson's term ends on September 1, 2025, after which she may choose to seek another five-year term.

- Patrick McTaggart-Cowan (January 1, 1964 – May 31, 1968)
- Kenneth Strand (Acting) (August 1, 1968 – July 31, 1969)
- Kenneth Strand (September 8, 1969 – August 31, 1974)
- Pauline Jewett (September 1, 1974 – October 9, 1978)
- K. George Pedersen (January 1, 1979 – March 31, 1983)
- William G. Saywell (September 1, 1983 – March 1, 1993)
- John O. Stubbs (August 1, 1993 – January 31, 1998)
- Jack P. Blaney (Pro Tem) (September 15, 1997 – January 31, 1998)
- Jack P. Blaney (February 1, 1998 – November 30, 2000)
- Michael Stevenson (December 1, 2000 – August 30, 2010)
- Prof. Andrew Petter (September 1, 2010 – August 31, 2020)
- Prof. Joy Johnson (September 1, 2020 – present)

== Academics ==
There are ten faculties at Simon Fraser University:

- Faculty of Applied Science
- Faculty of Arts and Social Sciences
- Beedie School of Business
- Faculty of Communication, Art and Technology
- Faculty of Education
- Faculty of Environment
- Faculty of Graduate Studies
- Faculty of Health Sciences
- Faculty of Science
- Stephens Family School of Medicine

=== Undergraduate ===
In the Fall 2021 semester, SFU had 25,595 undergraduates, with 12,812 of them being full-time and 12,783 part-time. International students made up 21% of the undergraduate student body, of which over 85% came from Asia, the highest proportion being from China at 43%. SFU's undergraduate student union is known as the Simon Fraser Student Society (SFSS).

=== Graduate ===
The university enrolled 4,701 graduate students in the Fall 2021 semester, with international students constituting 32% of the graduate student population. A Graduate Student Society supports and advocates for graduate students at the university.

=== Continuing education ===
SFU also offers non-credit programs and courses to adult students. As of 2016, SFU Continuing Studies offers more than 300 courses and 27 certificate and diploma programs, mostly delivered either online or part-time from SFU's downtown Vancouver or Surrey campus. Continuing Studies also manages a part-time degree completion program, called SFU NOW: Nights or Weekends, for working adults pursuing a bachelor's degree.

=== Staff unions ===
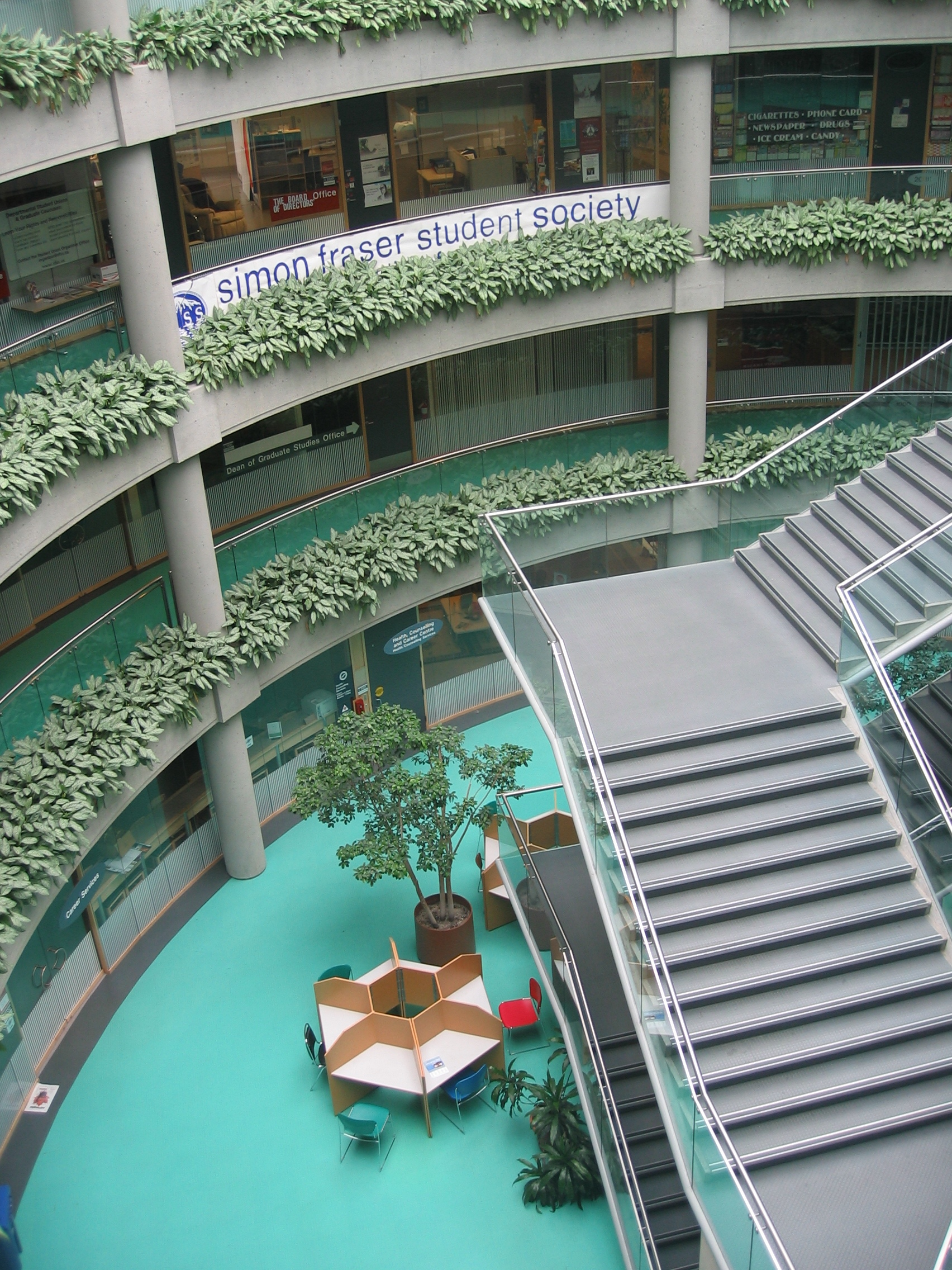
The Maggie Benston Centre, home to many of the administrative activities at SFU

Teaching assistants, tutor markers, sessional instructors, language instructors, Graduate Facilitators and Research Assistants at SFU are unionized. The union, the Teaching Support Staff Union (TSSU), is independent. Faculty and lecturers are members of the Faculty Association. Staff are members of the Canadian Union of Public Employees (CUPE), the Administrative and Professional Staff Association (APSA), or Polyparty. A few positions at the university, such as some in Human Resources and senior administrative positions, fall outside the five associations or unions above.

Under the previous president, Andrew Petter, SFU's administration has incurred a number of grievances and bad faith bargaining judgments. During their most recent rounds of bargaining, both the TSSU and CUPE local 3338 resorted to job action, and the BC Labour Relations Board found SFU's administration to be bargaining in bad faith with the CUPE local. Conflicts since then include unpaid wages (in Fall 2013, 18% of TSSU members reported that they were not paid on the first payday; by the term's third payday, some members still had not received their wages), and a health plan, redundant with the provincial health plan available to all international students after their first three months in-province and costing double a prior plan's cost, in which international students are automatically enrolled.

=== Rankings and reputation ===
University rankings

World rankings
- ARWU World: 301–400
- QS World: =308
- THE World: 301–350
- USNWR World: 359
- 13–16

Canadian rankings
- QS National: 13
- THE National: 12–15
- USNWR National: 12
- Maclean's Comprehensive: 1
- Maclean's Reputation: 10

Simon Fraser University has placed in various international post-secondary school rankings. In the 2022 Academic Ranking of World Universities rankings, the university ranked 301–400 in the world and 13–17 in Canada. The 2024 QS World University Rankings ranked the university 318th in the world and thirteenth in Canada. The 2023 Times Higher Education World University Rankings placed Simon Fraser 251–300 in the world, and 11–13 in Canada. In U.S. News & World Report 2022–23 global university rankings, the university placed 317th in the world, and 12th in Canada. In Maclean's 2027 rankings, the university placed first in their mid-size university category. The university also placed ninth in 2026 in Maclean's reputation category. Simon Fraser University was ranked despite having opted out from participation in Maclean's graduate survey since 2006.

In the World's Universities for Real Impact (WURI) 2022 rankings, SFU ranked 18th in the world, and 1st in Canada. In QS's 2022 graduate employability ranking, the university ranked 301–500 in the world, and 10–17 in Canada.

=== Research ===
In 2020, Simon Fraser University received a sponsored research income (external sources of research funds) of C$167.256 million, the 17th highest in Canada. In the same year, the university's faculty averaged a sponsored research income of $188,600, while graduates averaged $34,000.

Simon Fraser's research performance has been noted by several bibliometric university rankings, which uses citation analysis to evaluates the impact a university has on academic publications. In 2019, the Performance Ranking of Scientific Papers for World Universities ranked Simon Fraser 378th in the world, and 16th in Canada. In University Ranking by Academic Performance's 2018–19 rankings, the university placed 362nd in the world, and 15th in Canada.

SFU also works with other universities and agencies to operate joint research facilities. These include Bamfield Marine Station, a major centre for teaching and research in marine biology; TRIUMF, a powerful cyclotron used in subatomic physics and chemistry research. SFU is also a partner institution in Great Northern Way Campus Ltd in Vancouver. In March 2006, SFU approved an affiliation agreement with a private college for international students to be housed adjacent to its Burnaby campus. This new college named Fraser International College, which was in the Multi Tenant Facility (now renamed as "Discovery 2 Building") located in Discovery Parks Trust SFU site, is now moved into "Discovery 1 Building" after Discovery Parks Trust returned the building to Simon Fraser University. The MODAL Research Group, based at Simon Fraser, partners with multiple Canadian universities and arts organizations to carry out multi-disciplinary research in the arts with an emphasis on the study of artistic learning and engagement.

In 2008, SFU has the highest publication impact among Canadian comprehensive universities and the highest success rates per faculty member in competitions for federal research council funding from the Natural Sciences and Engineering Research Council (NSERC) and the Social Sciences and Humanities Research Council (SSHRC).

In 2017, Simon Fraser University entered into an agreement with Huawei to receive cloud computing equipment.

In 2022, Simon Fraser University announced the creation of the cross-disciplinary Institute of Neuroscience and Neurotechnology (INN) research hub to empower neuroscience-related research and collaboration across the university.

== Student life ==
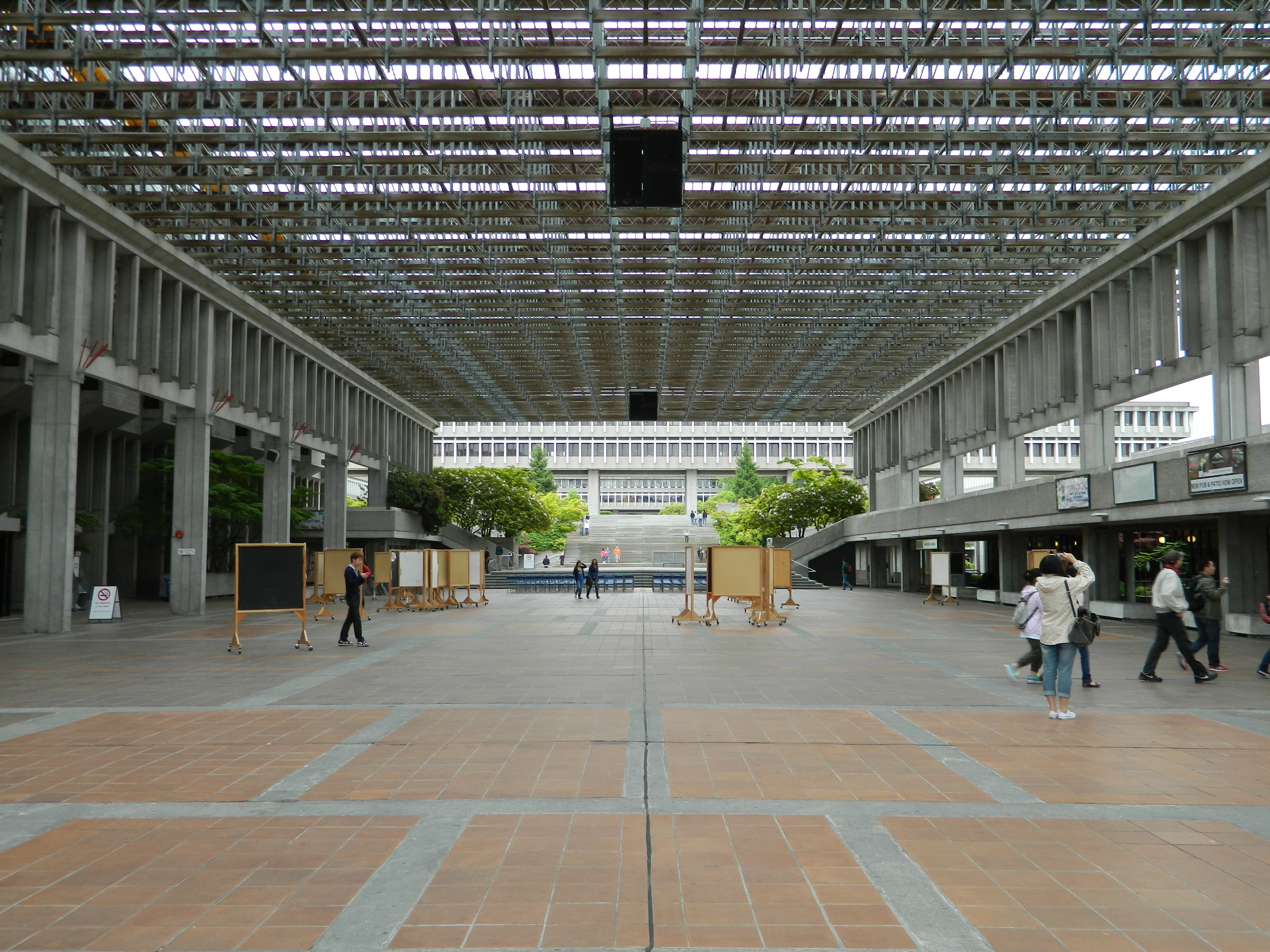
Convocation Mall in the Burnaby Campus

The student newspaper The Peak was established shortly after the university opened and is circulated throughout the university. CJSF 90.1 FM has been SFU's campus community radio station since the early 1970s. The Simon Fraser Student Society provides funding for over 300 campus clubs. Various campus events include the annual Terry Fox Run, Gung Haggis Fat Choy, Clubs Week, and other multi-cultural events.

The Tau chapter of Phrateres, a non-exclusive, non-profit social-service club, was installed here in 1966. Between 1924 and 1967, 23 chapters of Phrateres were installed in universities across North America, including the Theta chapter nearby at the University of British Columbia.

=== Greek organizations ===
Six Greek organizations have formed SFU arms, although none are recognized by the university pursuant to a policy enacted in 1966:

Fraternities:

- Phi Kappa Pi National Fraternity, Omega Epsilon chapter
- Delta Kappa Epsilon International Fraternity, Tau Beta chapter

Sororities:

- Kappa Beta Gamma International Sorority, Alpha Gamma chapter
- Delta Alpha Theta National Sorority, Beta chapter
- Alpha Pi Phi International Sorority, Eta chapter
- Tau Sigma Phi National Sorority, Epsilon chapter

Co-ed Professional Fraternities:

- Phi Delta Epsilon International Pre-Medical Fraternity, CAN Beta chapter
- Alpha Kappa Psi, The Professional Business Fraternity

== Athletics ==
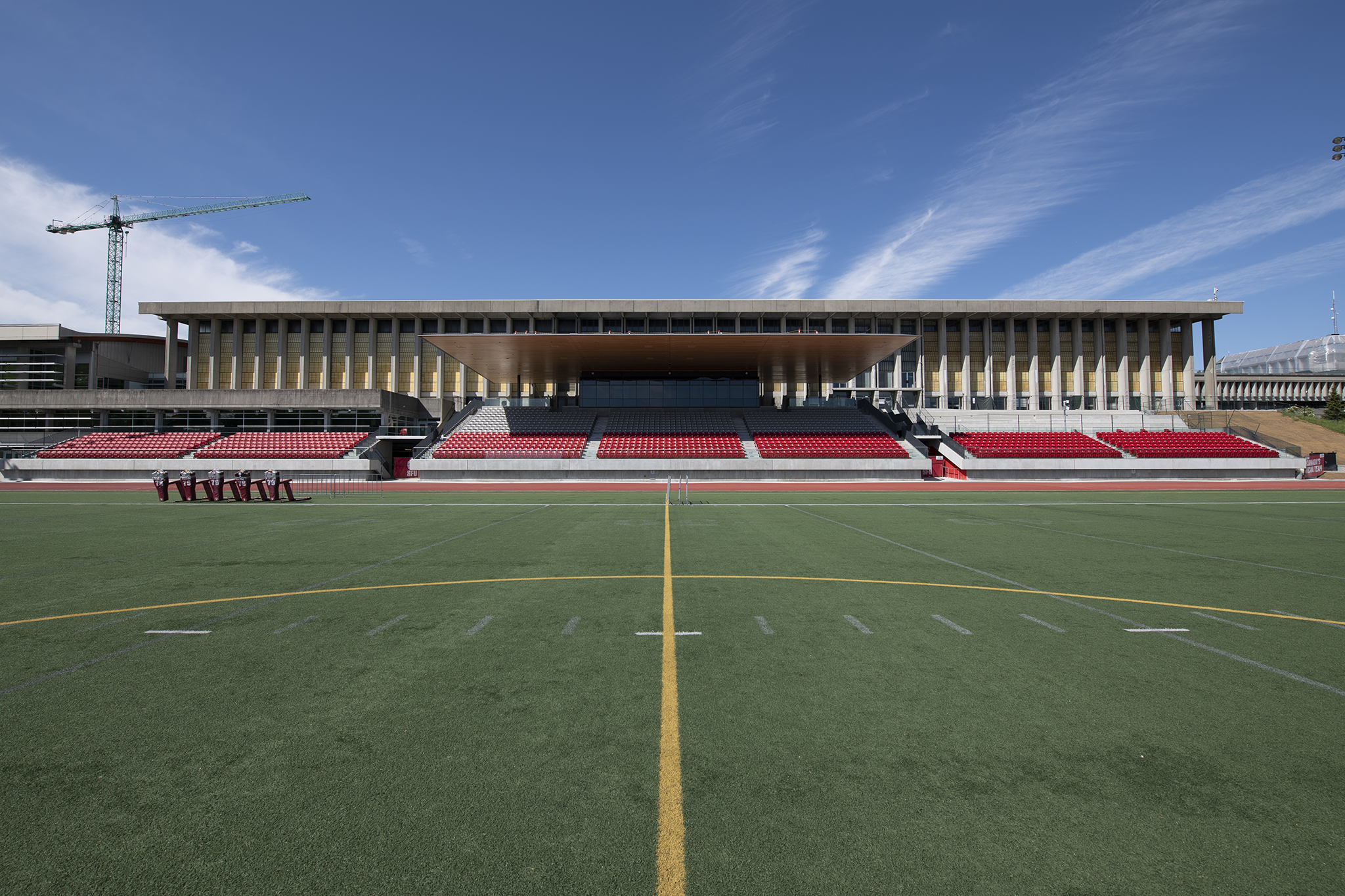
SFU Stadium at Terry Fox Field

The university's varsity sports teams are called the Simon Fraser Red Leafs, and the mascot is a Scottish Terrier named McFogg the Dog. In sports and other competitions, there tends to be a strong rivalry between SFU and The University of British Columbia.

The team is the first and currently the only athletic program from outside of the United States that competes in the National Collegiate Athletic Association (NCAA). Before joining the NCAA, the team used to compete in both the Canadian Interuniversity Sports (CIS, now U Sports) and the National Association of Intercollegiate Athletics (NAIA). In total, SFU has 15 varsity sport teams and 300 athletes. All varsity teams compete for their respective NCAA national championships, except for the Women's Wrestling team which competes for the National Collegiate Women's Wrestling Championship (www.ncwwc.com).

Beside the varsity teams, SFU also houses various competitive club teams, including Men's Lacrosse, who currently competes in the Men's Collegiate Lacrosse Association, and Men's Hockey, who currently competes in the British Columbia Intercollegiate Hockey League. Other club teams include rugby, cheerleading, rowing, quidditch, and field hockey.

SFU has won the NAIA NACDA Director's Cup five times, among others. On Friday, July 10, 2009, the NCAA announced that it had accepted SFU as a Division II member and would begin after a two-year transition period. SFU later competed in the Great Northwest Athletic Conference. It is the first Canadian university to be accepted as a member of the NCAA at any level. In 2012, the team was accepted as the first international full member of the NCAA.

Many former team athletes later represented Canada during the Olympic Games, including gold medalists Carol Huynh and Daniel Igali, and Olympic medalists Sue Holloway and Hugh Fisher. Other team alumni include: Jay Triano, Chris Rinke, wrestler Ari Taub, and Carolyn Murray.

== Notable alumni ==
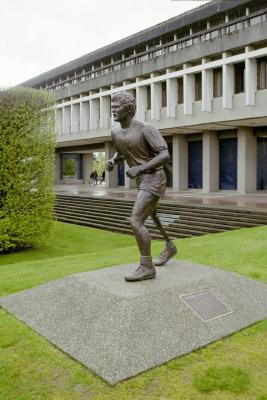
Statue of Terry Fox in the Academic Quadrangle plaza

As of 2023, the university's alumni network included over 180,000 graduates from over 140 countries. Alumni have received a number of academic awards. As of 2011, four SFU graduates have been named Rhodes Scholars, including Joel Bakan.

SFU faculty and alumni have won 43 fellowships to the Royal Society of Canada, three Rhodes Scholarships and one Pulitzer Prize. Among the list of alumni includes three premiers of British Columbia (Glen Clark, Gordon Campbell and Ujjal Dosanjh), Vancouver Canucks owner Francesco Aquilini, Prime Minister of Lesotho Pakalitha Mosisili, and Max Planck Institute director Robert Turner.

Another notable alumni was humanitarian and cancer research activist Terry Fox, an athlete and an alumnus of SFU who embarked on the run across Canada to raise money and awareness for Cancer research. Fox's Marathon of Hope had a lasting legacy, with the Terry Fox Run being held around the world in commemoration of his efforts. In 2001, SFU conferred an honorary degree to Betty Fox, mother of Terry Fox and honorary chair of the Terry Fox Foundation.

Other notable alumni from the university include:

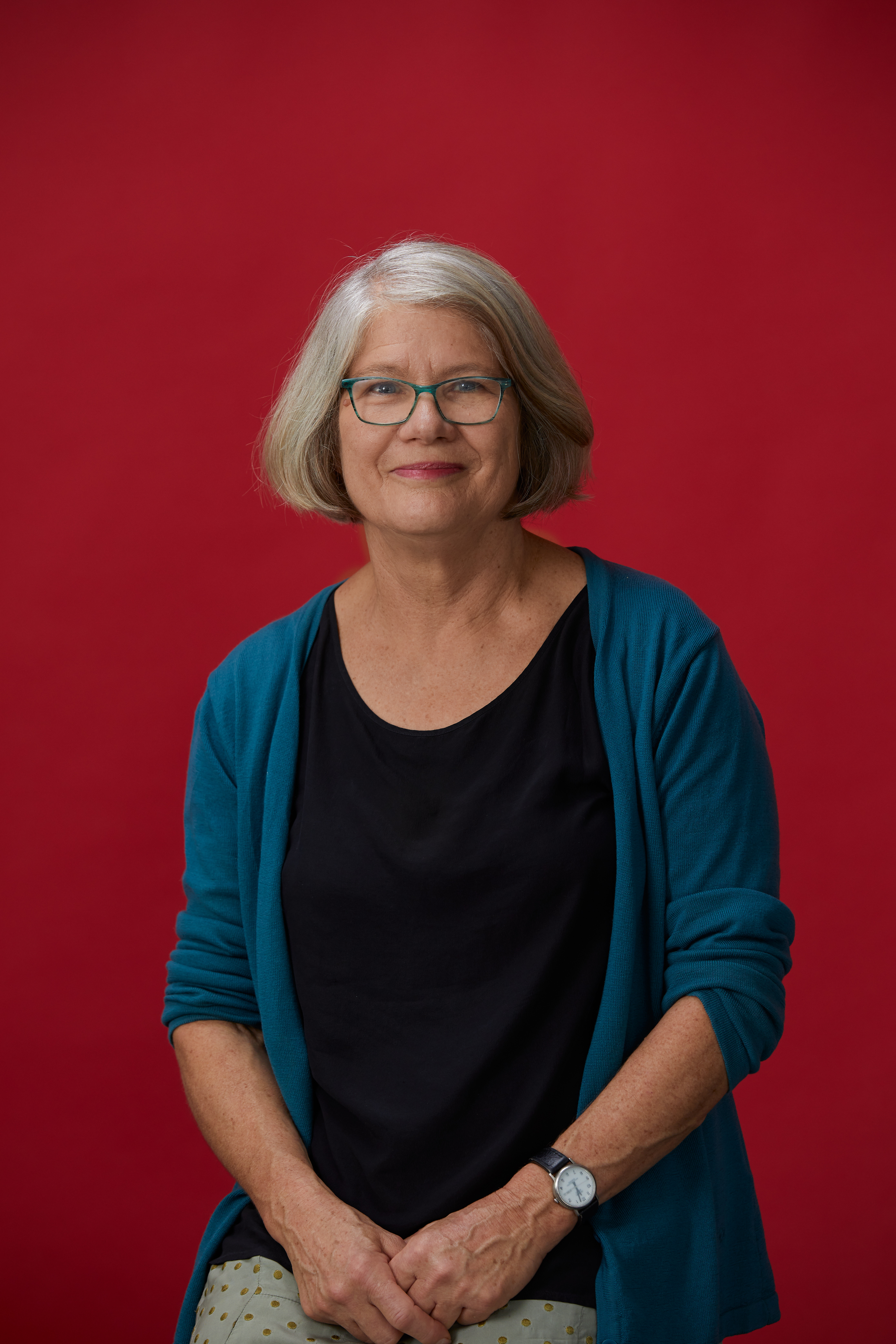
Bettina Bradbury, fellow of the Royal Society of Canada

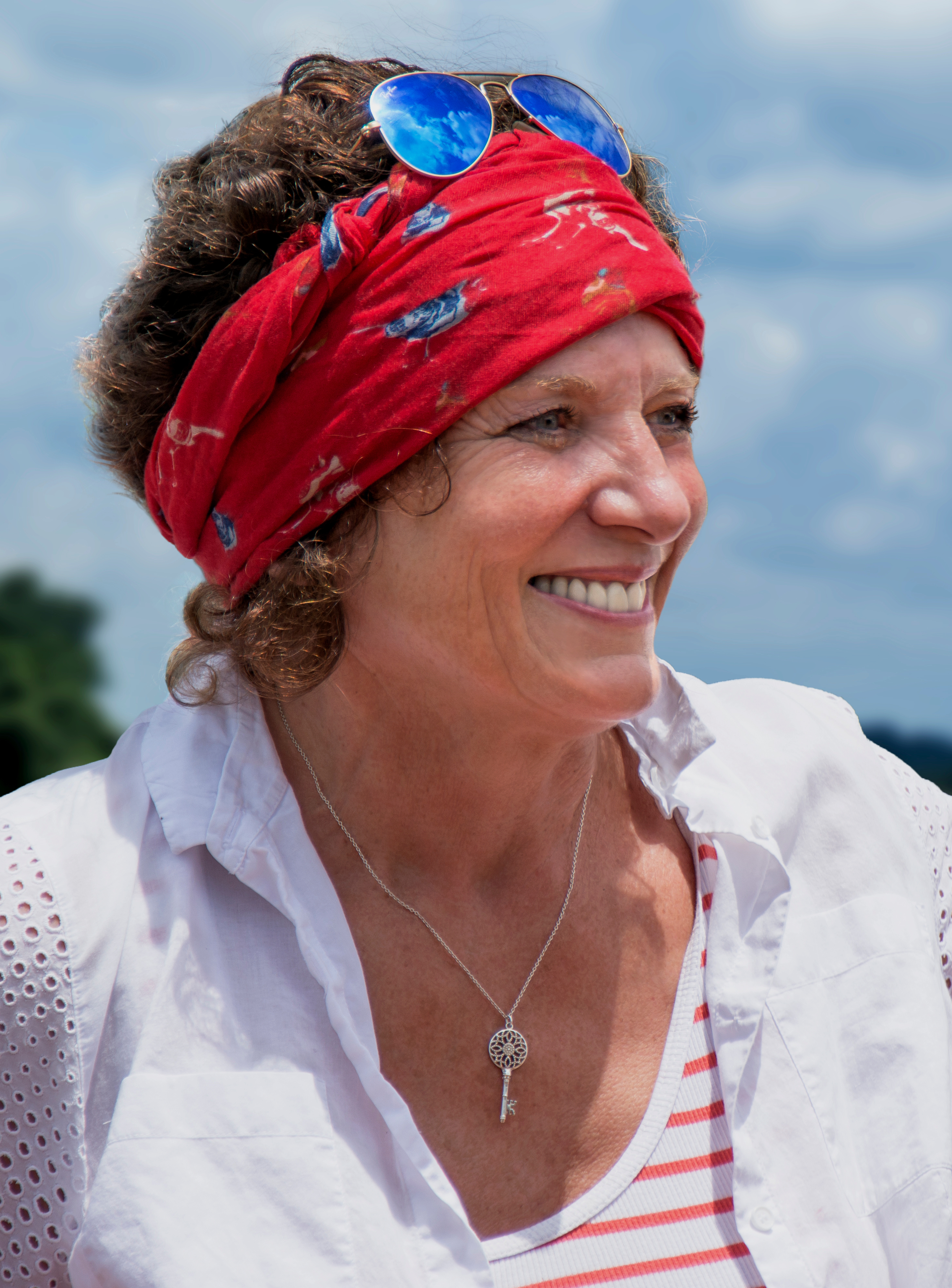
Margaret Trudeau, author and social advocate

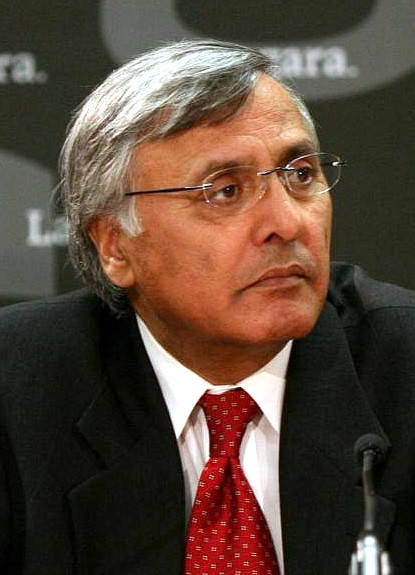
Ujjal Dosanjh, former Premier of British Columbia

- Barbara Adler, musician, poet, and storyteller
- Victor Ai, Chinese businessman
- Mimi Ajzenstadt (born 1956), Israeli criminologist; President of the Open University of Israel
- Francesco Aquilini, owner of the Vancouver Canucks and Rogers Arena
- Mahamudu Bawumia, former vice president of Ghana; former deputy governor, Bank of Ghana
- Bettina Bradbury, professor emerita in the Department of History and Gender Studies at York University and a fellow of the Royal Society of Canada
- Cam Broten, former leader of the Saskatchewan New Democratic Party
- Gordon Campbell, former premier of British Columbia
- Ian Campbell, Squamish Nation chief
- Calvin Chen, Taiwanese actor, singer, host
- Jim Chu, former chief constable of the Vancouver Police Department
- Glen Clark, former premier of British Columbia
- Marc Dalton, current MLA for Maple Ridge-Mission
- Taylor Dick, a biomechanist who now works for the University of Queensland
- Dino Patti Djalal, former Deputy Minister of Foreign Affairs of Indonesia
- Andrea Donaldson, theatre director and dramaturge
- Ujjal Dosanjh, former premier of British Columbia
- Bill Dow, actor, and professor of Theatre and Mythology at SFU
- Vera Etches, physician and Ottawa's medical officer of health
- Ann Marie Fleming, filmmaker, writer, and visual artist
- Cary Fowler, American agriculturalist
- Julia P. Gelardi, American royal historian
- Lyn Hancock, photojournalist and author
- Leon Hatziioannou, Canadian football player
- Ed Hill, award-winning stand-up comedian
- Zabeen Hirji, former chief human resources officer for the Royal Bank of Canada
- Karilynn Ming Ho, artist
- Curtis Hodgson, professional lacrosse player
- Hafeez Hoorani, Pakistani physicist
- Carol Huynh, Olympic gold medalist
- Daniel Igali, Olympic gold medalist
- Marianne Ignace, linguistics professor at Simon Fraser University and Director of SFU's Indigenous Languages Program and First Nations Language Centre
- Sut Jhally, communications professor and media expert
- Dan Kearns, Canadian football player
- Steve Kearns, Canadian football player
- Roger Kettlewell, Canadian football player
- Salleh Said Keruak, Malaysian politician and former Chief Minister Of Sabah
- Jónína Kirton, poet
- Vincent Kok, actor, director, and scriptwriter
- Jenny Wai Ching Kwan, MLA for Vancouver-Mount Pleasant
- Isabel Ge Mahe, vice president and managing director of Greater China, Apple Inc.
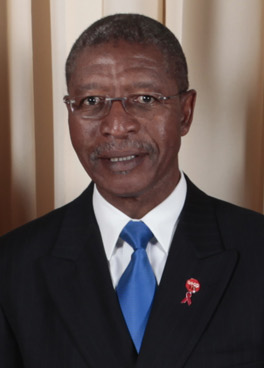
  Pakalitha Mosisili, former Prime Minister of Lesotho
- Sonija Kwok, actress and Miss Hong Kong 1999
- Michelle Lang, journalist
- Minh Le, creator of the popular Half-Life mod Counter-Strike
- Ken Lum, artist
- Marco Marra, scientist, director of Canada's Michael Smith Genome Sciences Centre, BC Cancer Agency
- Rachel Marsden, internationally syndicated columnist and talk-show host
- J. J. McCullough, YouTuber
- Loscil (Scott Morgan), musician, member of Destroyer
- Victor Montagliani, Canadian Businessman, President of CONCACAF and member of the FIFA Council
- Pakalitha Mosisili, prime minister of the Kingdom of Lesotho
- Mark Okerstrom, 2004 – President/CEO of Expedia Group
- John Oswald, Canadian composer best known for coining the term for Plunderphonics, the practice of making new music out of previously existing recordings
- Antony Page, dean of the Florida International University College of Law
- Carmen Papalia, artist
- Deanna C. C. Peluso, musician and composer
- Álvaro Santos Pereira, former Minister of Economy, Labour, Transport, Public Works and Communications of Portugal.
- Justin Ring, former CFL football player
- Melissa Roxburgh, actress known for Manifest (TV series)
- Mehdi Sadaghdar, electrical engineer, host of ElectroBOOM
- Alice L. Pérez Sánchez, organic chemist, medical researcher
- Maha Al-Saati, independent filmmaker
- Kelly Sheridan, the voice for Barbie in the Barbie film series from 2001 to 2010 and from 2012 to 2015
- Kathy Slade, artist
- Glen Suitor, sportscaster, former Canadian Football League player
- Sam Sullivan, former mayor of Vancouver
- Elsie Sunderland, environmental chemist; professor at Harvard
- Milun Tesovic, computer programmer and internet entrepreneur; founder of MetroLyrics
- Shashaa Tirupati, Canadian playback singer, songwriter, and music producer
- Jay Triano, lead assistant coach of the Charlotte Hornets
- Margaret Trudeau, former wife of Canadian former Prime Minister Pierre Trudeau
- Robert Turner, scientist, director at the Max Planck Institute for Human Cognitive and Brain Sciences
- David Usher, singer and songwriter
- John G. Webb, interventional cardiologist, performed the first transapical TAVI in 2006
- Zella Wolofsky, Canadian modern dancer and HCI researcher
- Choi Woo-shik, South Korean actor
- Yohana Yembise, Indonesian Minister of Women Empowerment and Child Protection
- Ryan Grantham, Canadian former actor and convicted murderer

=== Honorary alumni ===
At each convocation, SFU awards honorary degrees to various people from around the world for their activities and pursuits. In 1967, SFU awarded an honorary LL.D. (doctor of laws) to Marshall McLuhan, the first honorary degree awarded by the university. Ida Halpern, an ethnomusicologist whose professional papers are held in part by SFU, was similarly awarded an honorary LL.D. in 1978. On April 20, 2004, SFU conferred honorary degrees upon three Nobel Peace Prize recipients: the 14th Dalai Lama, Bishop Desmond Tutu, and human rights activist Shirin Ebadi. Other honorary alumni include award-winning filmmaker Costa-Gavras, skier Nancy Greene Raine, Milton Wong, Doris Shadbolt, economist Jeffrey Sachs, Peter Gzowski, Douglas Coupland, Lui Passaglia, Romeo Dallaire, Canadian businessman Stephen Jarislowsky, Iain Baxter, American agriculturalist Cary Fowler, experimental psychologist Steven Pinker, primatologist and environmentalist Jane Goodall, Martha Piper, Sarah McLachlan, Rick Hansen, Kim Campbell, Ray Hyman, Dr. A. P. J. Abdul Kalam (rocket scientist and former President of India) and Bill Nye.

== Arms ==
The school's original coat of arms was used from the university's inception until 2006, at which point the Board of Governors voted to adapt the old coat of arms and thereby register a second coat of arms. The adaptation replaced two crosslets with books after some in the university asserted the crosses had misled prospective international students into believing SFU was a private, religious institution rather than a public, secular one. In 2007, the university decided to register both the old coat of arms and the revised coat of arms featuring the books. In 2007, a new marketing logo was unveiled, consisting of white letters on block red.

Coat of arms of Simon Fraser University
Notes Granted April 20, 2007 Escutcheon Quarterly first and fourth Azure three fraises Argent second and third Argent three antique crowns Gules all within a bordure quarterly Argent and Gules on a chief Gules three open books proper bound and edged Or. Motto NOUS SOMMES PRÊTS

== See also ==
- CJSF-FM
- Education in Canada
- The Faculty of Communication, Art and Technology at Simon Fraser University
- Higher education in British Columbia
- List of colleges and universities named after people
- List of universities in British Columbia
- List of universities in Canada
- Simon Fraser Student Society
- Simon Fraser University Pipe Band
- The Peak
- Woodward's building
- Halo 4: Forward Unto Dawn
- List of Brutalist structures
