= FCAT =

FCAT or Fcat may refer to:

- Faculty of Communication, Art and Technology at Simon Fraser University in British Columbia, Canada
- Federative Committee on Anatomical Terminology, a developer of international standards for human anatomical nomenclature
- Festival of African Cinema (from earlier name Festival de Cine Africano de Tarifa), held in Spain and Morocco
- Florida Comprehensive Assessment Test, a standardized test formerly used on public schools in the state
