= William G. Saywell =

Canadian historian (born 1936)

William G. Saywell CM

5th President and Vice-Chancellor of Simon Fraser University
- In office 1983 – 1993
- Chancellor: Paul T. Cote; William M. Hamilton; Barbara J. Rae
- Preceded by: George Pedersen
- Succeeded by: John O. Stubbs

3rd Principal of Innis College, Toronto
- In office 1976 – 1979
- Preceded by: Peter H. Russell
- Succeeded by: Dennis Duffy

Personal details
- Born: William George Gabriel Saywell; 1936 (age 89–90) Regina, Saskatchewan, Canada

Academic background
- Education: University of Toronto (BA, MA, PhD)

Academic work
- Discipline: East Asian studies

William George Gabriel Saywell CM (born 1936) is a Canadian historian. He is the former president and vice-chancellor of Simon Fraser University.

== Early life and education ==
Saywell was born in 1936 in Regina, Saskatchewan to parents John Ferdinand Tupper Saywell and Vera Marguerite Saywell, alongside his elder brother John Saywell. In 1937, the family moved to British Columbia as his father had received a job position to become Lake Cowichan first high school principal. He attended the University of Toronto (U of T) for his Bachelor of Arts at University College, Master's degree, and PhD. While in his second year at U of T, Saywell enrolled in a course called "the Far East" which sparked his interest China and Japan.

In 1970, once Canada and China established diplomatic relations, Saywell became the first "resident Sinologist" at Canada's embassy in Beijing.

== Career ==
After earning his PhD, he joined the faculty of the Department of East Asian Studies at the University of Toronto. In 1983, Saywell was offered a position as president of Simon Fraser University. During his tenure as SFU's longest-serving president, he helped initiate the development of SFU's downtown Vancouver campus and increased gender equality in SFU's hiring practices. Upon the end of his term as president in 1993, Saywell was named president and chief executive officer of the Asia Pacific Foundation. The next year, he was named a Member of the Order of British Columbia.

In 1999, Saywell was appointed a Member of the Order of Canada. A few years later, he joined the Board of Directors of Palcan Fuel Cells Ltd. In 2009, Simon Fraser University formally named their new arts and social sciences complex Saywell Hall.
