= Taylor Dick =

Associate professor in biomechanics and researcher

Taylor J. M. Dick is a Canadian-born Associate Professor and the Director of Higher Degree Research at the School of Biomedical Sciences, University of Queensland. Dick is recognised for her research in neuromuscular biomechanics, where she focuses on the fundamental mechanisms of movement and their implications for health, disease, and evolution.

== Academic background ==
Dick completed her PhD in 2016 at Simon Fraser University. Following her doctorate, she undertook postdoctoral training in biomedical engineering at the University of North Carolina, where she investigated how bio-robotic devices affect locomotor energetics and neuromechanical stability during perturbations.

In 2017, Dick joined the University of Queensland. There, Dick established the Neuromuscular Biomechanics Laboratory and later became Director of Higher Degree Research at the School of Biomedical Sciences.

Dick's research and leadership have been recognised with the Queensland Tall Poppy Award, the International Union of Physiologists Junior Faculty Award, and the International Society of Electrophysiology and Kinesiology Kevin P. Granata Award. Dick received the International Society of Biomechanics Jaquelin Perry Emerging Scientist Award and has been twice nominated for the Faculty of Medicine Rising Star of the Year Award.

In addition to her research work, Dick was elected a member of the Executive Council of the International Society of Biomechanics and named Chair of the Comparative Neuromuscular Biomechanics Technical Group.
