= John Saywell =

Canadian historian (1929–2011)

John Tupper (Jack) Saywell (April 3, 1929 – 20 April 2011) was a Canadian historian specializing in the fields of politics and constitution.

== Early life and education ==
John Tupper Saywell was born on April 3, 1929, to parents John Ferdinand Tupper Saywell and Vera Marguerite Saywell in Weyburn, Saskatchewan.

Upon the birth of his younger brother William G. Saywell, the family moved to British Columbia in 1937. His father had received a job position to become Lake Cowichan first high school principal. Saywell received his B.A. and M.A. from the University of British Columbia and his Ph.D. from Harvard University.

== Career ==
He taught at the University of Toronto from 1954 to 1962. He joined York University in 1963 and was Dean of Arts at York from 1963 to 1973. Saywell retired from all teaching responsibility at York University in 1999.

== Work as Historian ==
Saywell was the editor of two journals: Canadian Historical Review, from 1957 to 1963; and Canadian Annual Review from 1960 to 1979. Among his books were The Office of Lieutenant-Governor: A Study in Canadian Government and Politics, which won the Delancey K. Jay Prize at Harvard University. Just Call Me Mitch: The Life of Mitchell F. Hepburn, published in 1991, won the Floyd Chalmers Award for the best book on Ontario history. His 2002 study of the Supreme Court of Canada, titled The Lawmakers: Judicial Power and the Shaping of Canadian Federalism, won the John W. Dafoe Prize for "distinguished writing on Canada and/or Canada’s place in the world." He also interpreted Canadian, British and European history for thousands of high-school students across Ontario through close to a dozen textbooks with his friend John Ricker.

== Legacy ==
The John T. Saywell Prize for Canadian Legal History was endowed by his family and friends and is given bi-annually by the Osgoode Society for Canadian Legal History to the best new book in Canadian legal history. He was director of the graduate program in history at York from 1987 to 1998; its Ph.D. graduates can be found in most major Canadian universities.

== Publications ==
- The McInnes incident in British Columbia, 1897-1900 : together with a brief survey of the Lieutenant-Governor's constitutional position in the Dominion of Canada, (1950)
- The Office of Lieutenant-Governor (1957)
- The Canadian Journal of Lady Aberdeen (1960)
- Quebec 70: A Documentary Narrative (1971)
- Lord Minto's Canadian Papers (1983)
- Making the law: the courts and the constitution (1991, ISBN 0-7730-5098-1)
- Just call me Mitch: the life of Mitchell F. Hepburn (1991, ISBN 0-8020-3467-5)
- Canada: pathways to the present (1994, ISBN 0-7737-5681-7)
- The Lawmakers: Judicial Power and the Shaping of Canadian Federalism (2002, ISBN 0-8020-3751-8).
- Someone to Teach Them: York and the Great University Explosion, 1960-1973 (2008, University of Toronto Press, ISBN 978-0-8020-9827-6)
