= SFU School for the Contemporary Arts =

Coordinates: 49.282469°N 123.108703°W

School for the Contemporary Arts
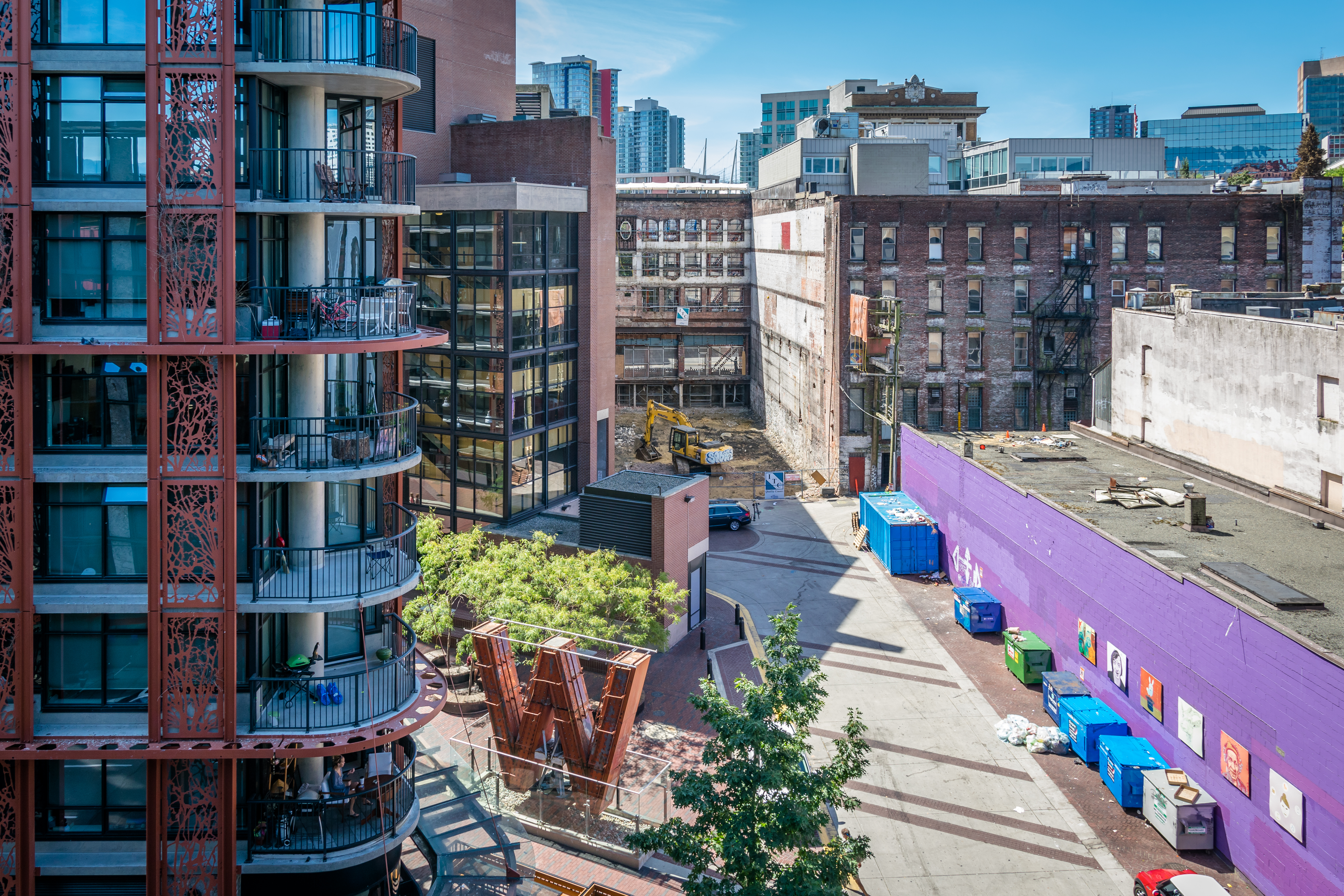
- Woodward's Building
- Former names: Centre for the Arts (1977-1990), Centre for Communications and the Arts (1966-1977), Communications Centre (1965-1966)
- Motto: Do Real Things
- Type: Public
- Established: 1965; 61 years ago
- Parent institution: Simon Fraser University
- Dean: Carman Neustaedter
- Director: Peter Dickinson
- Associate Director: Denise Oleksijczuk
- Academic staff: 32
- Administrative staff: 13
- Postgraduates: 35
- Doctoral students: 18
- Location: Vancouver, British Columbia, V6B 1H4, Canada
- Campus: Vancouver
- Language: English
- Indigenous Lands Occupied: xʷməθkʷəy̓əm (Musqueam), Sḵwx̱wú7mesh Úxwumixw (Squamish), səlilwətaɬ (Tsleil-Waututh), q̓íc̓əy̓ (Katzie), kʷikʷəƛ̓əm (Kwikwetlem), Qayqayt, Kwantlen, Semiahmoo and Tsawwassen.
- Faculty: Communication, Art and Technology
- Colors: SFU Light Red SFU Dark Red SFU Dark Grey Black
- Website: www.sfu.ca/sca.html
- Goldcorp Centre for the Arts

SFU's School for the Contemporary Arts ("SCA") is the contemporary arts school at Simon Fraser University (SFU), which opened in 1965. The school is situated in the Vancouver campus (downtown Vancouver, Canada), mainly located in the historic Woodward's Building.

The SCA offers programs with studio classes in Dance, Film, Music & Sound, Performance Production & Design, Theatre & Performance, Visual Art, as well as Art, Performance & Cinema Studies (APCS). The SCA offers an MA in Contemporary Arts, an MFA in Interdisciplinary Arts, and a PhD in Contemporary Arts.

The school used to house the Praxis Centre for Screenwriters; a non-profit organization devoted to the professional development of Canadian screenwriters and filmmakers. The centre closed after 26 years of operation.

== History ==
=== 1965-1969 ===
In the university's first year of operation (1965), the Faculty of Education was organized into several Centres, including the Communications Centre (renamed the Centre for Communications and the Arts in 1966). The centre provided credited and non-credited courses in communications, media studies, and the fine and performing arts, as well as public programming (of theatre productions, films, art exhibits, and lectures.

=== 1970-1976 ===
Over 1969 and 1970 the Faculty of Education reorganized; the Centre transferred out of the Faculty and reported instead first to the Director of General Studies, then to the Director of University Services (1971). The Centre retained its functions of public-events programming and provision of non-credit, non-degree instruction in the arts, while academic credit programming was transferred to the newly formed Department of Communication Studies in the Faculty of Education. During this period, the Centre focussed its energies on organizing the cultural life of the university, with an extensive series of public programs, including a full-scale production of Henry Purcell's 17th-century opera, "Dido and Aeneas" in 1973. The Purcell String Quartet became the SFU's Quartet-in-Residence in 1972, an association that continued until 1982.

=== 1976-1989 ===
In 1976 the Centre was reorganized as the Centre for the Arts, a department within the Faculty of Interdisciplinary Studies. Its mandate was to develop credit programs in the fine and performing arts, while inheriting its predecessor's public-programming functions, including management of both the university Theatre and Art Gallery. In 1984 the Centre sustained a large funding cut, approximately a third of its budget. Its home faculty, the Faculty of Interdisciplinary Studies, was disbanded in 1985 and the Centre moved to the Faculty of Arts.

=== 1990- ===
In 1990 the Centre changed its name to "School for the Contemporary Arts". In the same year, the School created a graduate Master of Fine Arts (MFA) degree. In 2008, the school moved to the Woodward's Building in the downtown eastside. The school is now part of the Faculty of Communication, Art and Technology. In 2023 the university sued Kristen Tanya Schiefke, the administrative manager for the school of contemporary arts from 2012-2023. The university alleged she misappropriated approximately $197,000 in funds over several years through invoicing SFU for work that was never performed and by depositing student locker fees into her personal bank account. The allegations were not proven in court. In 2024 SFU ended the Woodward's Cultural Programs, and in 2025 closed the SCA Vancity Office of Community Engagement due to budget cuts. In September of 2025, SFU opened a 12,000-square-foot arts and cultural facility called the 'Marianne and Edward Gibson Art Museum' on its Burnaby Mountain campus. The museum works with the School for the Contemporary Arts.

== Programs ==
The School for the Contemporary Arts offers the following undergraduate and graduate programs:

Undergraduate Programs:	Graduate Programs:
Dance; Film; Music & Sound; Performance Production & Design; Theatre & Performance; Visual Arts; Bachelor of Arts in Art, Performance & Cinema Studies; Joint Degree/Diploma program with the National Ballet School; Honours in Theatre & Performance	Master of Arts in Contemporary Arts; Master of Fine Arts in Interdisciplinary Arts; PHD in Contemporary Arts

== Campuses ==
The School for the Contemporary Arts is located within the Vancouver campus of SFU, spread across three separate buildings.

SCA Locations

=== The Goldcorp Centre for the Arts ===
The Goldcorp Centre for the Arts holds the SCA's main classrooms, studios, shops, offices, and venues. It is located in the historic Woodward's Building.

The Goldcorp building houses several theatres, arts centres, cinemas, and other arts spaces, including;

- The Fei and Milton Wong Experimental Theatre
- The Djavad Mowafaghian Cinema
- The Djavad Mowafaghian World Art Centre
- The Audain Gallery
- Studio T
- Studio D
- Small Screening Room
- Francis and Samuel Belzberg Atrium

==== Audain Gallery ====
The Audain Gallery is a contemporary art gallery that exhibits contemporary art and serves as a forum for academic and critical discussion on art and culture. The gallery's programming integrates works by established and emerging professional artists with projects by SFU students. This includes the Audain Visual Artist in Residence (AVAIR) program, which hosts visiting artists for exhibitions, workshops, and public events.

As part of the university's curriculum, the gallery hosts annual student exhibitions, including the Master of Fine Arts (MFA) Graduating Festival, the Bachelor of Fine Arts (BFA) Graduate Exhibition, and the BFA Third-year Project. Additional student-led events and exhibitions are organized by the Perel Committee, a student group within the school.

=== 611 Alexander ===
611 Alexander Street holds upper level Undergraduate and MFA Visual Arts studios, as well as instructional space.

=== Harbour Centre ===
The Harbour Centre is the main building for the Vancouver campus of SFU, occasional SCA classes occur here.

== See also ==
- Simon Fraser University
- Faculty of Communication, Art and Technology at Simon Fraser University
