= Barbara J. Rae =

Canadian businesswoman and academic administrator (1930–2021)

Barbara Joyce Rae CM OBC (May 17, 1930 – January 3, 2021) was a Canadian businesswoman. She was the first female chancellor of Simon Fraser University (SFU) and former CEO of Office Assistance (now ADIA Canada Ltd).

== Early life and education ==
Barbara Joyce Rae was born on May 17, 1930 in Prince George, British Columbia.

Rae earned her MBA from Simon Fraser University (SFU) in 1972. She became the first woman to graduate with an Executive MBA from SFU.

== Career ==
Rae began work with Office Assistance in 1952 and eventually became its vice-president and later CEO. As CEO, she introduced maternity benefits and lobbied the B.C. government to legislate a four-day, 40 hour work week so that women could both work full-time and care for their families. She later was the first female governor for the Vancouver Board of Trade and the first female chancellor of SFU. Rae served in her role as chancellor from 1987 to 1993.

As chancellor, Rae used her position to promote athletics at SFU. She pushed the "It's Her Game" campaign which aimed to raise $1 million towards scholarships for female student athletes. As well, The Barbara Rae Cup, a tournament between SFU and UBC, was established in 1988. Rae also began the "Bridge to the Future campaign" which aimed to raise private funds for special projects. While in her capacity as chancellor, she co-chaired the B.C. Council of Christians and Jews and sat on the Pacific Region board of directors of the Salvation Army.

Rae received numerous awards from the Vancouver city, including the Canadian Volunteer Award, Entrepreneur of the Year (1987), West Vancouver Achievers Award (1987), Vancouver YWCA's Business Woman of the Year (1986), and Simon Fraser University's Outstanding Alumnae Award (1985). She was also appointed a Member of the Order of Canada in 1993. Rae was later the recipient of an honorary degree from SFU.

In 2003, Rae co-launched Dekora, a home staging company which was later the basis for HGTV's The Stagers television series.

== Personal life and death ==
Rae was married to George Suart, Vice President of Administration at SFU until his death in 2019. Barbara J. Rae died on January 3, 2021, at the age of 90.

Academic offices
Preceded by William M. Hamilton	Chancellor of Simon Fraser University; June 5, 1987 – June 4, 1993	Succeeded by Joseph Segal
