= Faculty of Communication, Art and Technology at Simon Fraser University =

School at Simon Fraser University

Faculty of Communication, Art and Technology
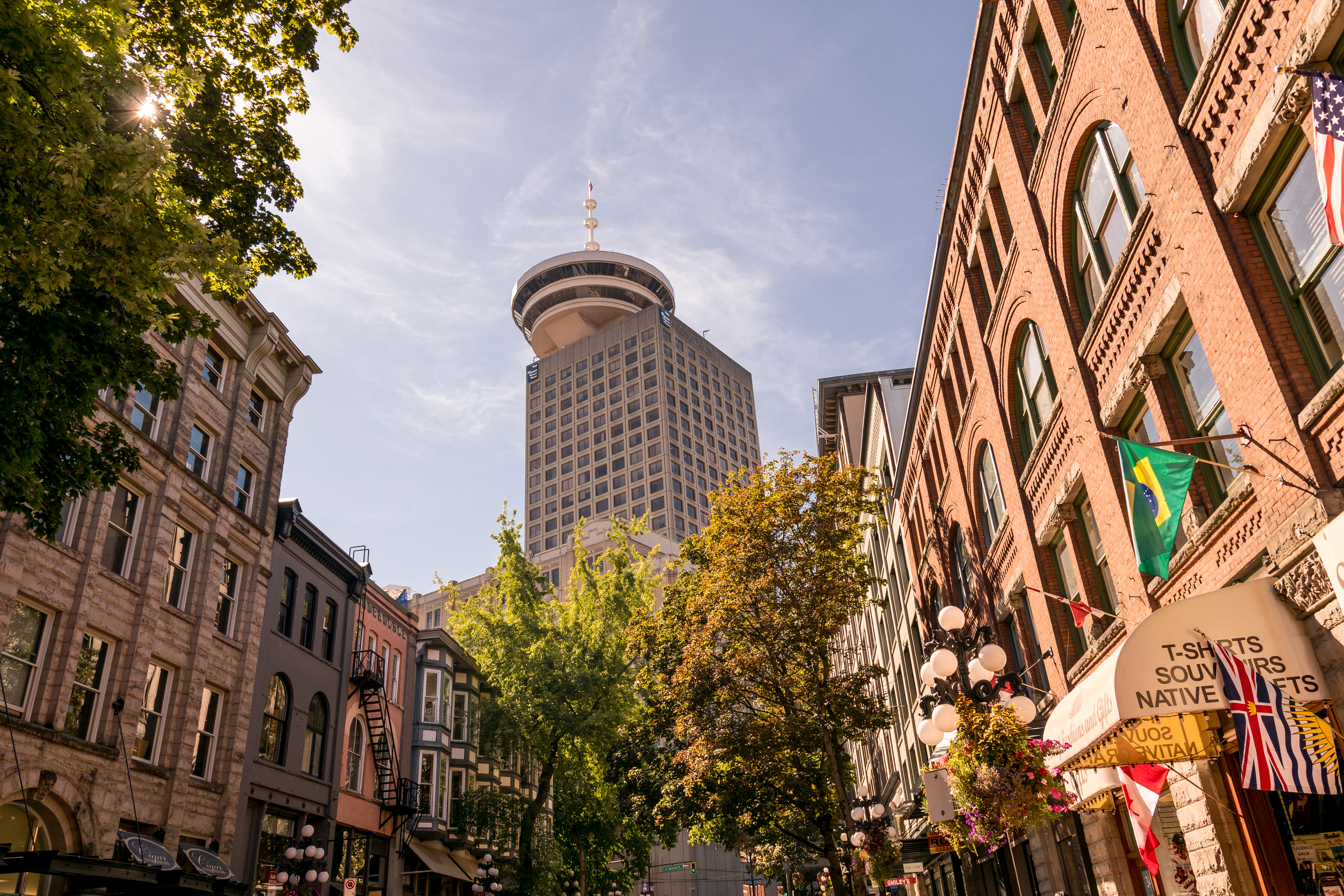
- Type: Public
- Established: 2009; 17 years ago
- Parent institution: Simon Fraser University
- Dean: Carman Neustaedter
- Location: Burnaby, Vancouver, and Surrey, British Columbia, Canada
- Campus: Urban
- Website: www.sfu.ca/fcat.html

The Faculty of Communication, Art and Technology (FCAT) is a faculty at Simon Fraser University (SFU) in British Columbia, Canada. It comprises five schools and programs, over three SFU campuses: Burnaby, Vancouver, and Surrey.

== Schools ==
=== School of Communication (CMNS) ===
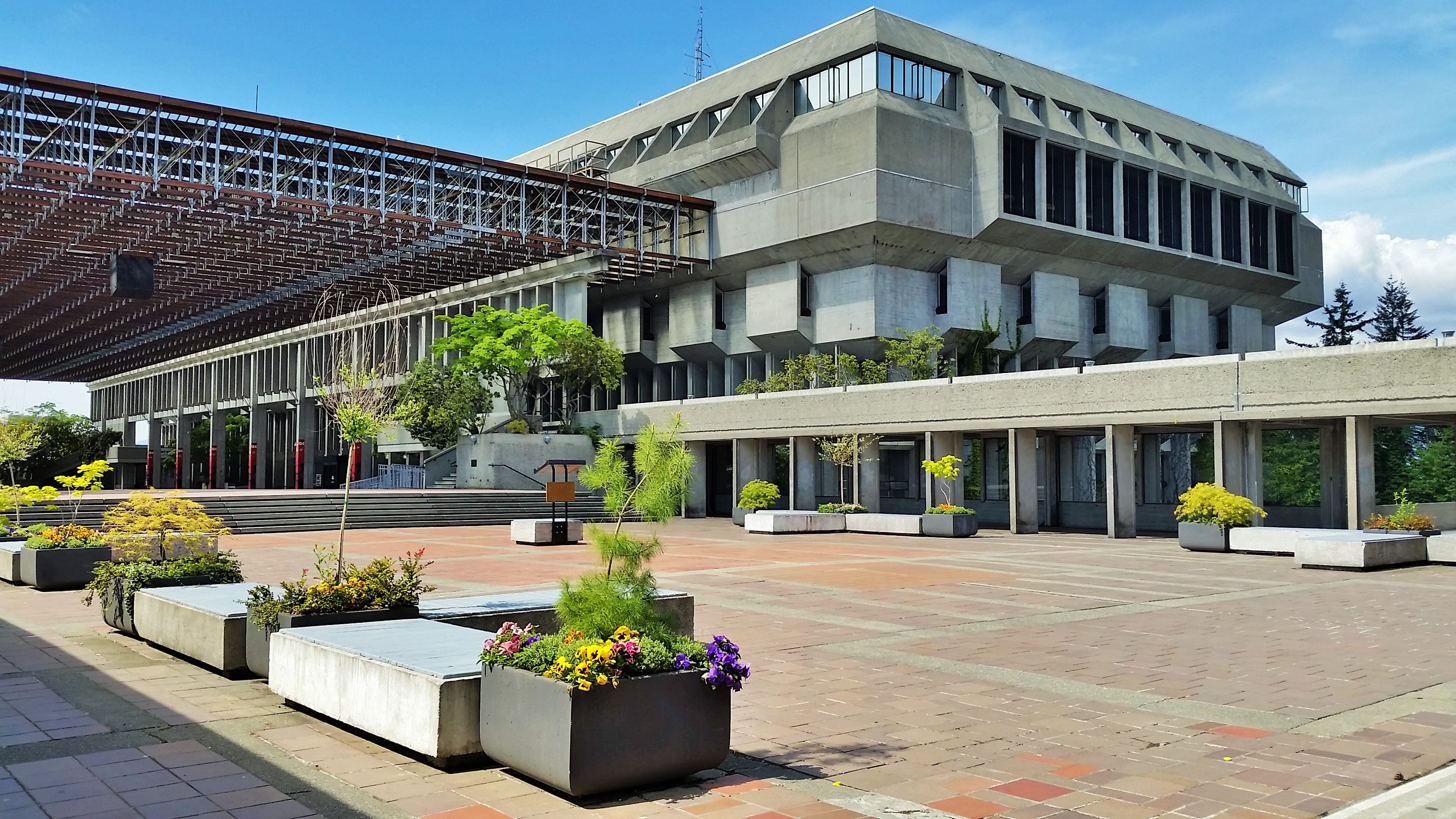
Simon Fraser University's Burnaby Campus

Based at the university’s Burnaby campus, the School of communication theory provides undergraduate and graduate instruction and research focused on the critical analysis, history, and production of media and communication infrastructures. The curriculum integrates communication theory, political economy, and data studies with applied projects aimed at addressing local and global environmental, economic, technological, and political issues.

The program combines scholarly research with practical training to analyze the social and ethical implications of rapidly changing communication systems. Students use critical framework methodologies to examine media cultures, technology policy, and societal structures.

=== School for the Contemporary Arts (SCA) ===
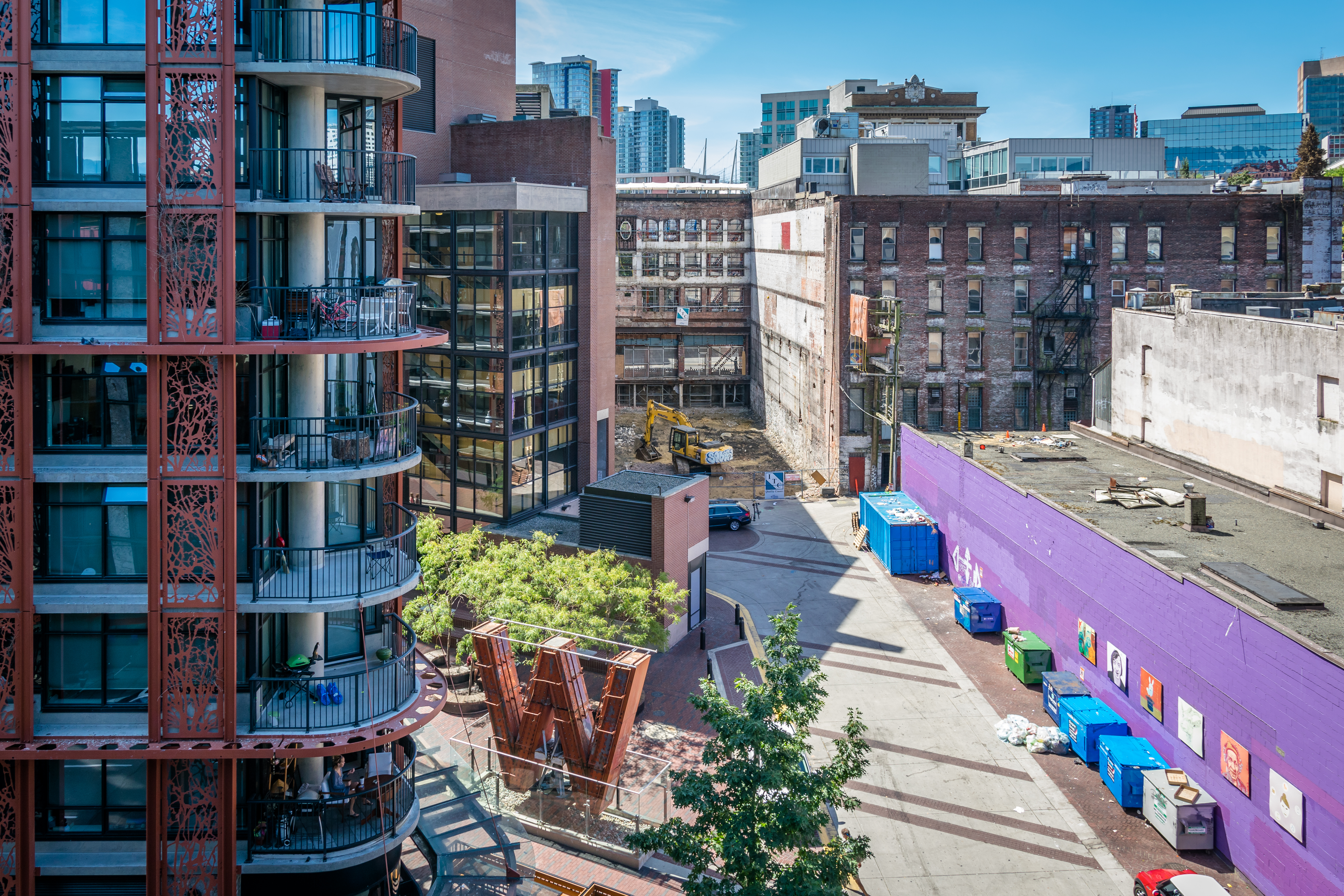
The Goldcorp Centre for the Arts in Downtown Vancouver

Located at the university’s Downtown Vancouver campus, the School for the Contemporary Arts provides undergraduate and graduate instruction and research that integrates studio-based practice with historical and theoretical studies. The interdisciplinary curriculum connects creative practice with academic inquiry, focusing on critical contemporary issues and collaborative work across disciplines.

The program emphasizes the application of art as an instrument for critical expression to address modern social, economic, and environmental issues. At both levels, the curriculum examines the relationships between artists, researchers, and society, combining formal artistic experimentation with scholarly research to prepare students for professional practices in the global arts sector.

=== School of Interactive Arts and Technology (SIAT) ===
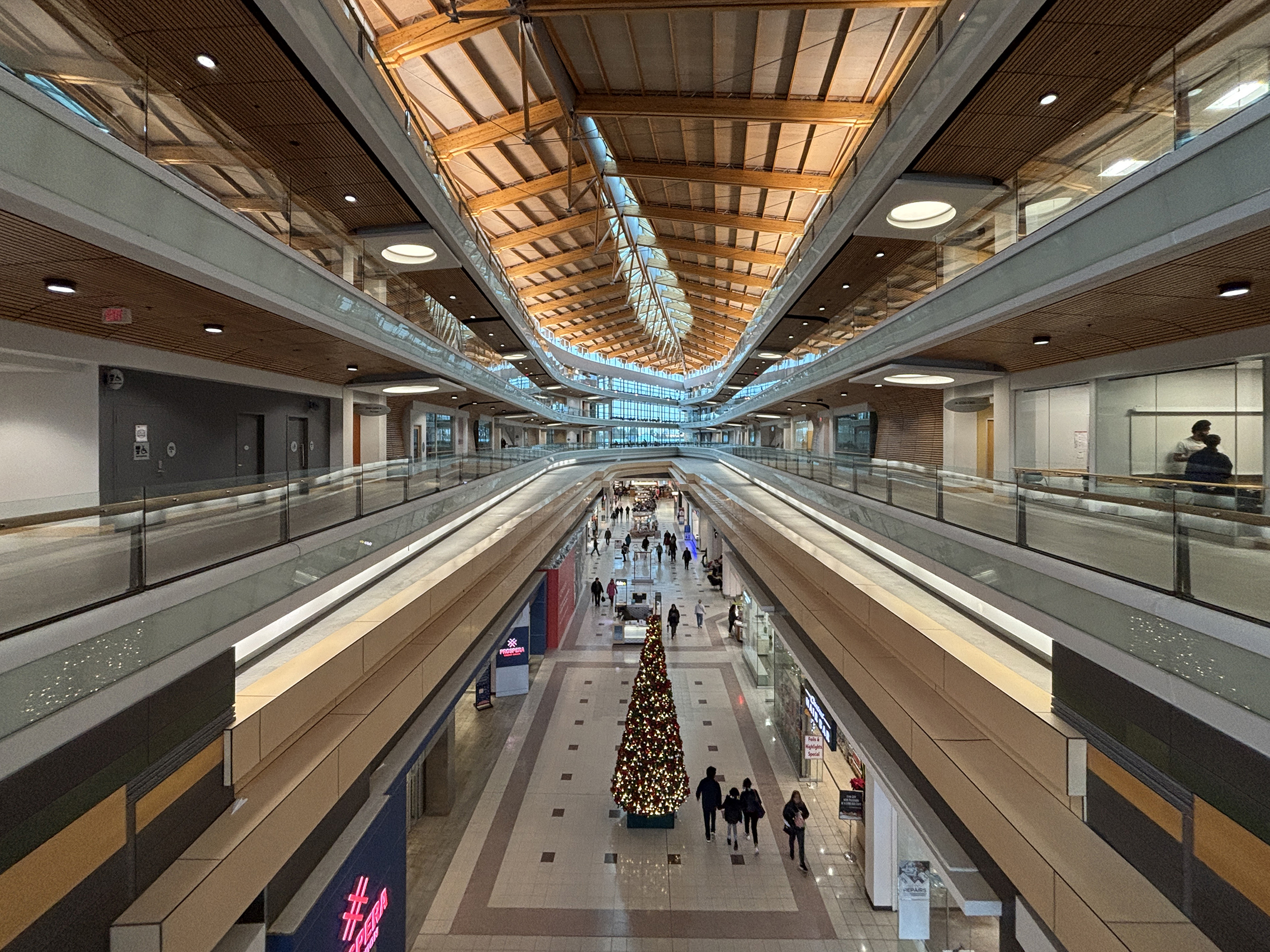
The School of Interactive Arts and Technology at the Surrey Campus

Located at the university’s Surrey campus, the School of Interactive Arts and Technology (SIAT) provides undergraduate and graduate instruction and research in the design, development, and evaluation of human-centered digital technologies. The interdisciplinary curriculum integrates the study of human cognition, media and cultural analysis, computational systems, and digital art production.

The program focuses on solving problems and exploring the intersection of art, technology, and the humanities. Students and faculty utilize multi-disciplinary research methodologies to develop new technologies and media experiences, aiming to address critical cultural, organizational, and societal issues.

== Programs ==
=== Publishing Programs (PUB) ===
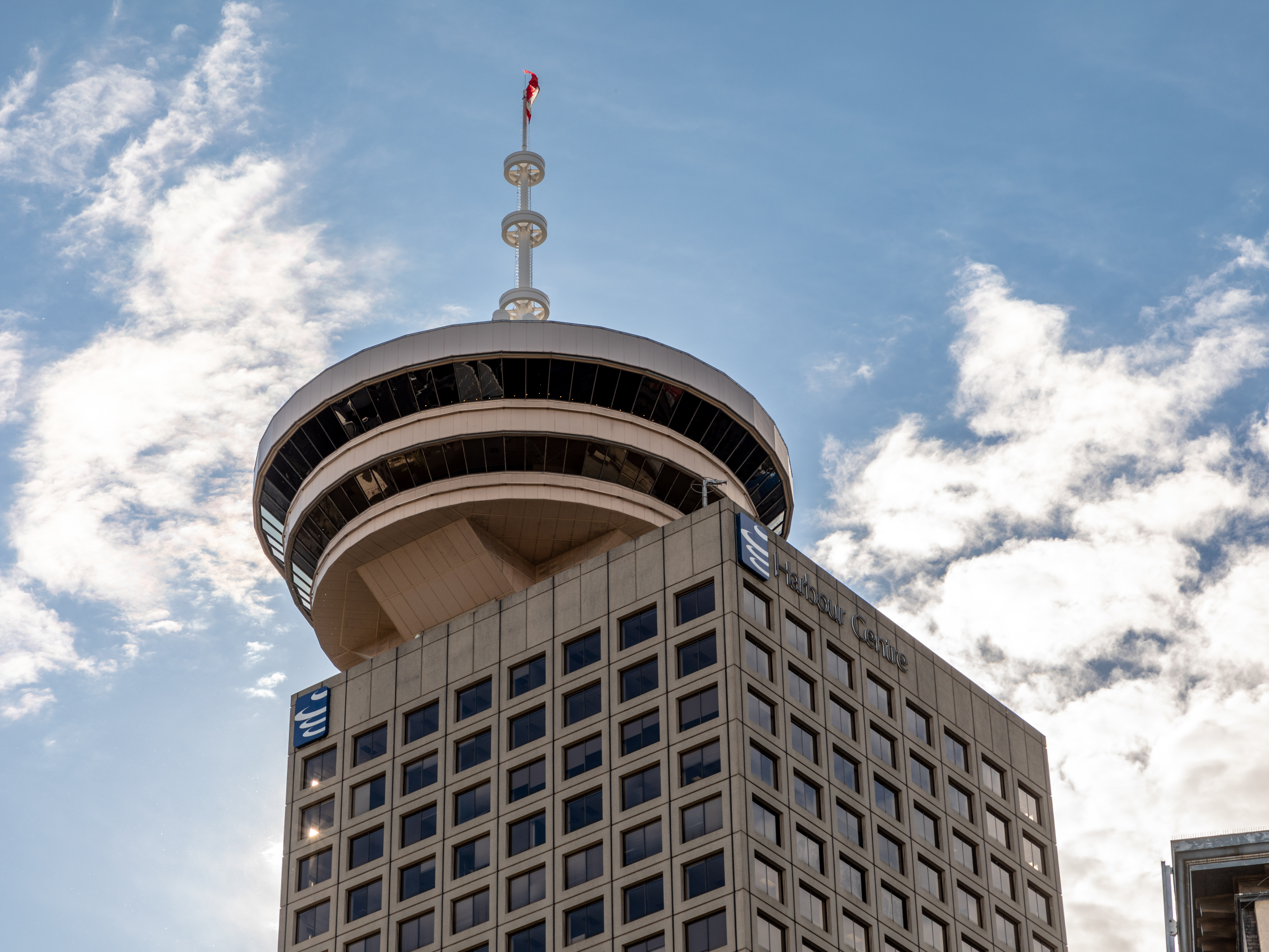
The Vancouver campus at the Harbour Centre in Downtown Vancouver

Based at the university’s Vancouver campus, the Publishing Program provides professional and academic training through its Master of Publishing (MPub) degree and an undergraduate minor in Print and Digital Publishing. The program integrates advanced industry practice with applied research to examine current trends in the publishing sector.

Supported by the Canadian Institute for Studies in Publishing, the university's dedicated research unit, the program investigates the shifting technological and economic landscapes of the publishing industry.

=== Master of Digital Media Program (MDM) ===
Offered at the Centre for Digital Media, the Master of Digital Media (MDM) is a 16-month professional graduate program administered through a partnership between the British Columbia Institute of Technology (BCIT), the University of British Columbia (UBC), Simon Fraser University (SFU), and Emily Carr University of Art and Design (ECU).

The curriculum focuses on the development of digital media products and creative technologies. Admitting students from diverse academic backgrounds—including art, design, computer science, business, and the natural and social sciences—the interdisciplinary program combines collaborative, project-based coursework with industry mentorship to focus on product development, team leadership, and technical design.

== See also ==
- Education in Canada
- Simon Fraser University
- Higher Education in British Columbia
- Woodward's building
- SFU School for the Contemporary Arts
