= Alice L. Pérez Sánchez =

Costa Rican researcher

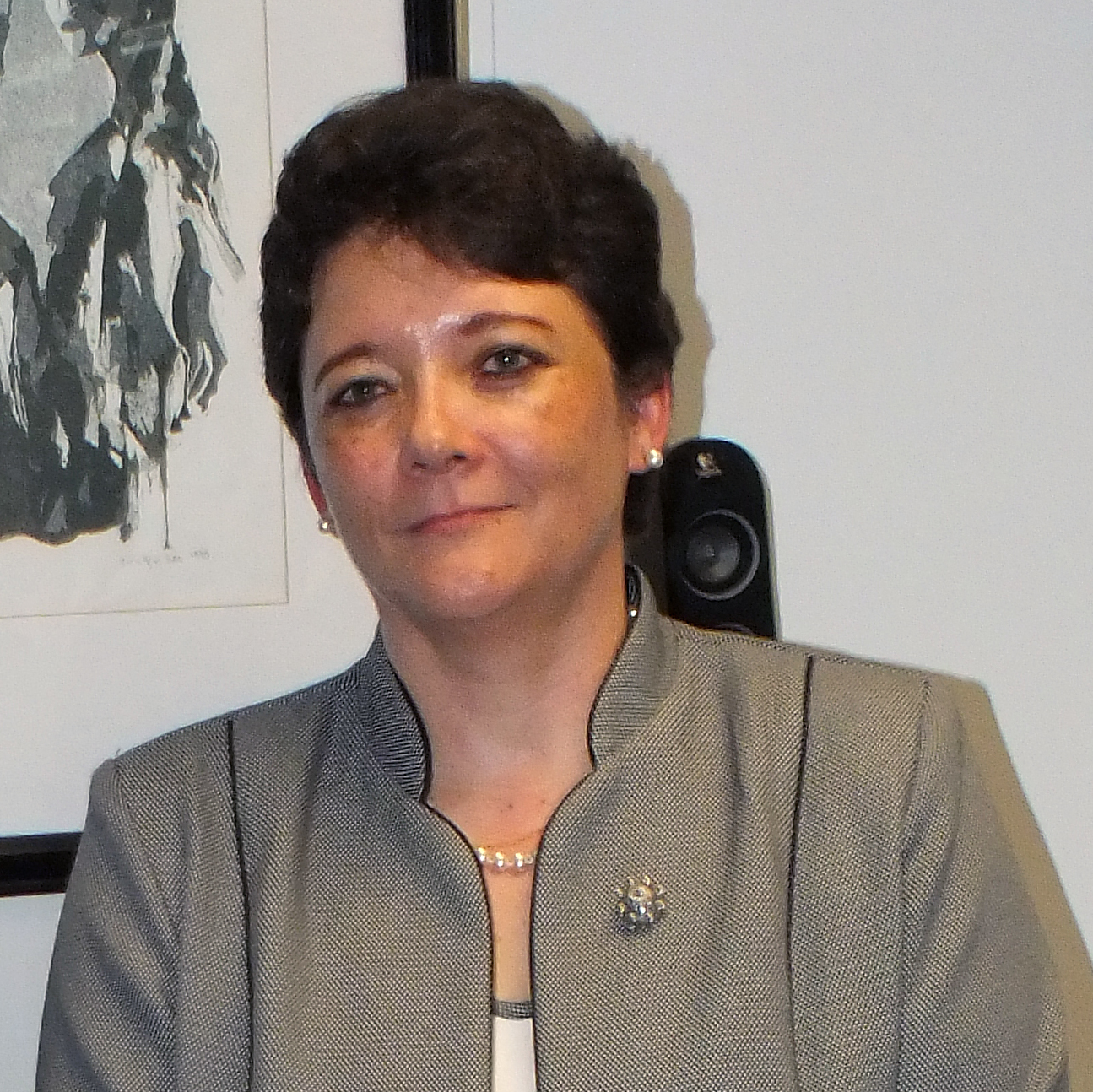

Alice L. Pérez Sánchez was born in Costa Rica on December 23, 1963. She is a significant figure in the field of chemistry due to her outstanding contributions to scientific research, education, and leadership in Costa Rica and Latin America. Her work in the synthesis of organic compounds with anti-parasitic and anti-cancer properties addresses critical health challenges, particularly in tropical regions where parasitic diseases are prevalent. With more than 46 published research articles and collaborative projects, such as those with Dr. Guy Lamoureux on substituted naphthoquinone derivatives, she has advanced the scientific understanding of medicinal chemistry.

Career:

Alice L. Pérez Sánchez has worked at the University of Costa Rica for over 37 years. She has served as a professor in the Department of Chemistry since July 1987, dedicating nearly four decades to teaching and research. In addition to her role as a professor, she served as the Vice-dean of Research at the University of Costa Rica between 2012 and 2016. She is currently a professor in the Department of Chemistry at the University of Costa Rica and a researcher at the Centro de Investigaciones en Productos Naturales (CIPRONA). From 2002 to 2010, she was the director of CIPRONA, and from 2009 to 2012, she directed the university’s doctoral science program. Her scientific work focuses on the synthesis of organic compounds with anti-parasitic and anti-cancer chemicals.

Education:

Alice L. Pérez Sánchez completed her Bachelor of Science (B.Sc.) in Chemistry at the University of Costa Rica, graduating in 1985. She continued her studies at the same institution, earning a Licenciatura in Organic Chemistry in 1989. She later pursued her doctoral studies at Simon Fraser University in Canada, where she obtained her Ph.D. in Chemistry in 1995.
