= List of National University of Singapore people =

The National University of Singapore has produced numerous notable alumni (mostly Singaporean and Malaysian nationals) including four Singapore Presidents and two Singapore Prime Ministers. This list included those who attended or graduated from the predecessor institutions: King Edward VII College of Medicine, Raffles College and the University of Singapore.

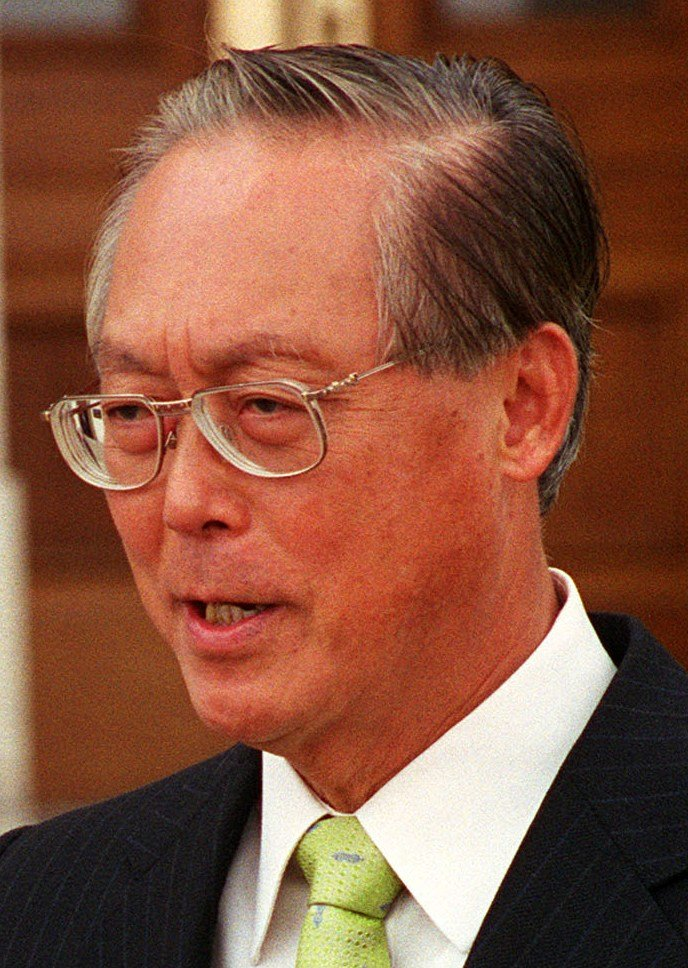
Goh Chok Tong, 2nd Prime Minister of Singapore

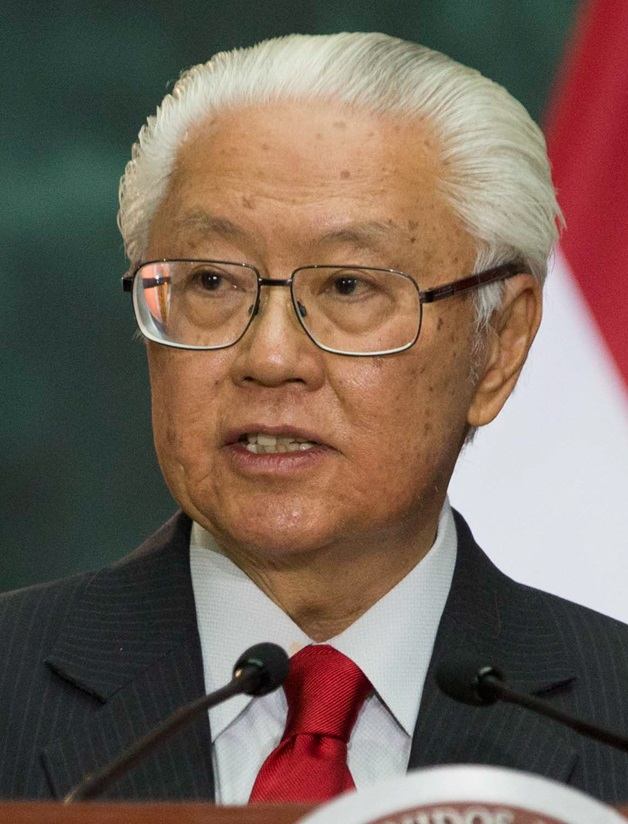
Tony Tan, 7th President of Singapore

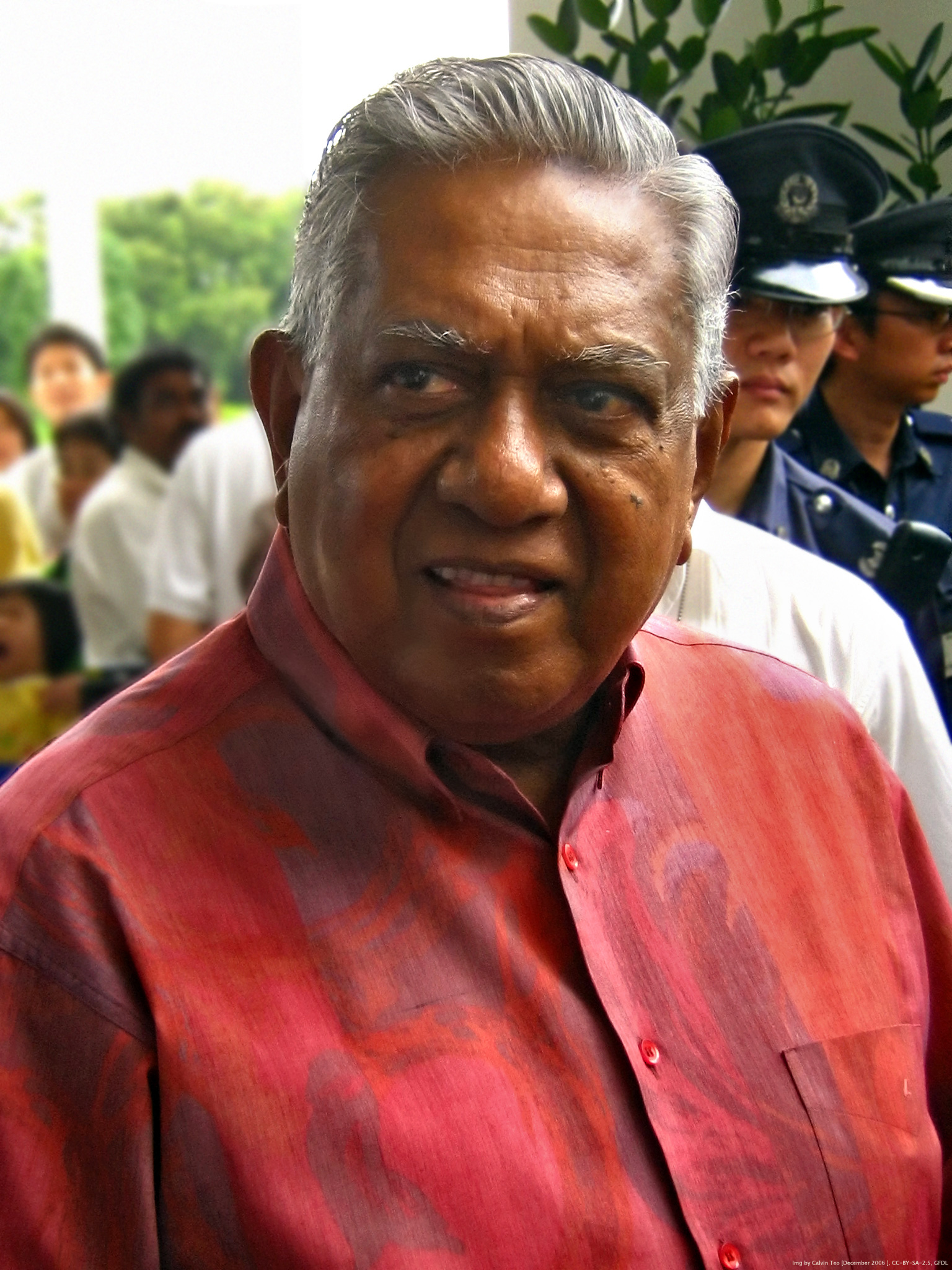
S. R. Nathan, 6th President of Singapore

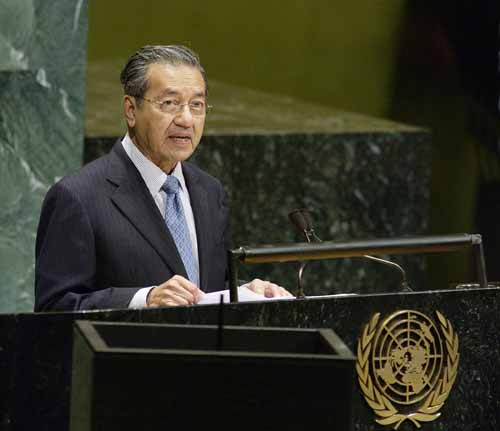
Mahathir Mohamad, 4th and 7th Prime Minister of Malaysia

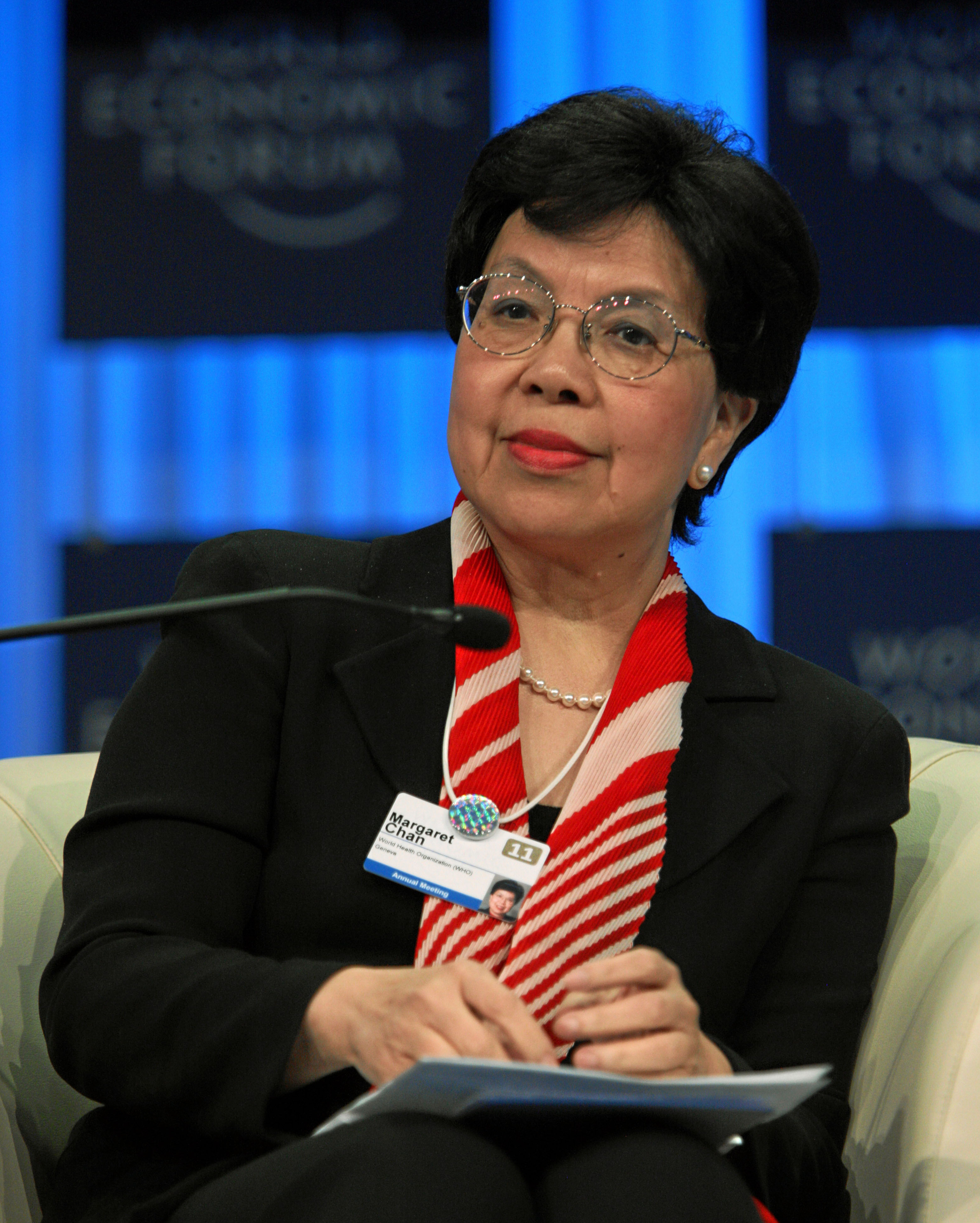
Margaret Chan, 7th Director-General of the World Health Organization

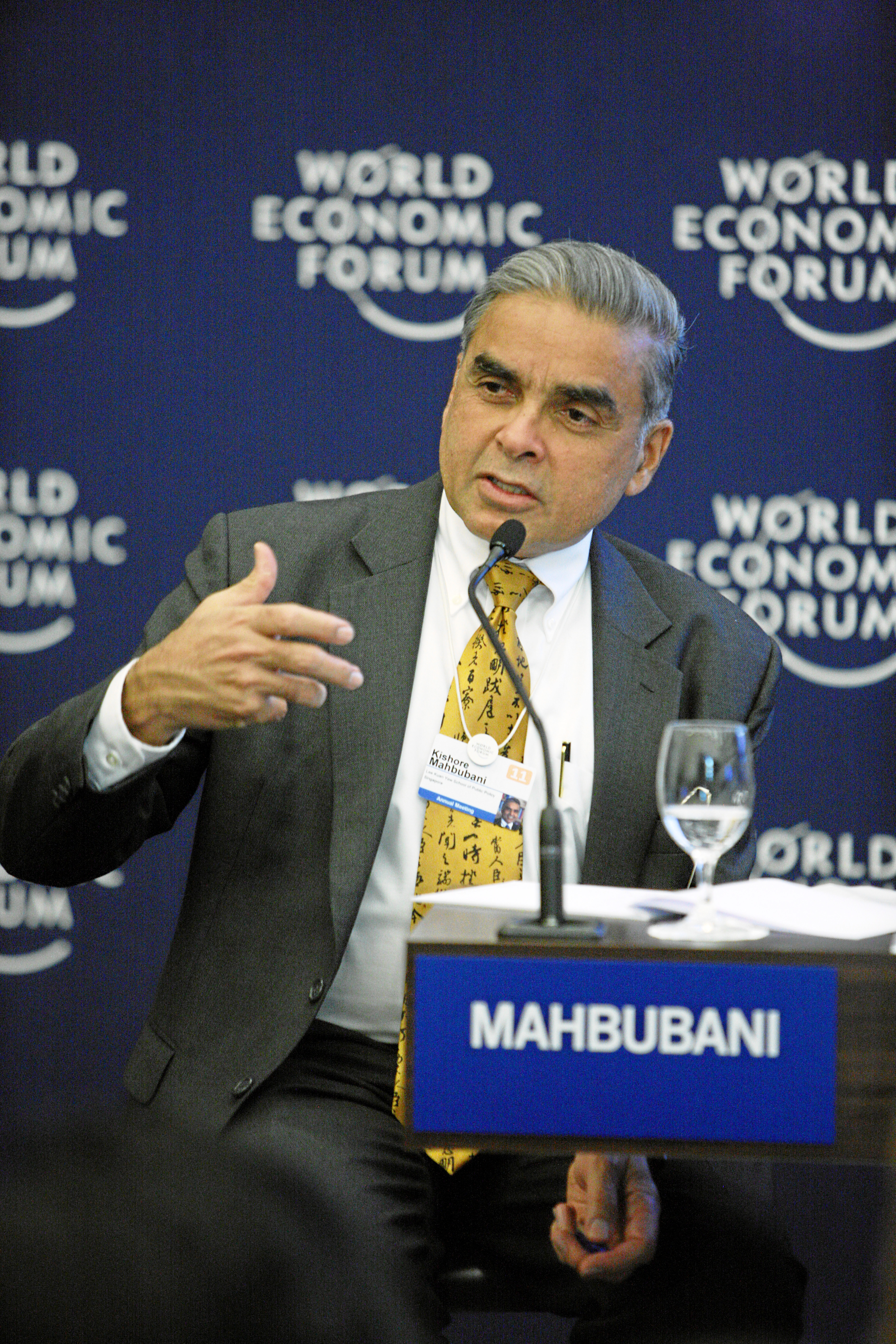
Kishore Mahbubani, President of the United Nations Security Council (2001–2002)

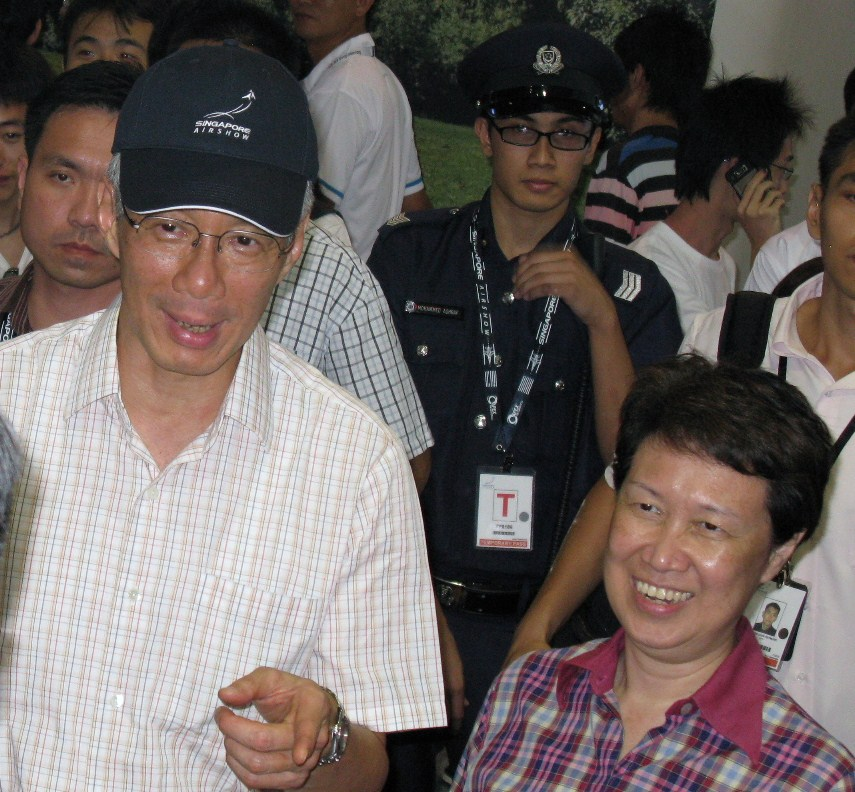
Ho Ching, wife of Prime Minister Lee Hsien Loong and former CEO of Temasek Holdings

== Notable alumni ==
=== Business ===
- Adam Khoo – Best-selling author I am Gifted So Are You; entrepreneur
- Andy Ong – chief executive officer of ERC Group of companies
- Bachtiar Karim – executive chairman of Musim Mas, a large palm oil conglomerate in Indonesia and based in Singapore.
- Chew Choon Seng – former chairman of Singapore Airlines, Chairman of the Singapore Exchange and the Singapore Tourism Board
- Chua Sock Khoong – Group CEO of Singapore Telecommunications Ltd (Singtel)
- Ho Ching – Former chief executive officer of Temasek Holdings
- Dilhan Pillay Sandrasegara – chief executive officer of Temasek Holdings
- Olivia Lum – chief executive officer of Hyflux Group
- Philip Yeo – chairman of SPRING Singapore
- Dato Sri Tahir – Billionaire and Founder of the Mayapada Group
- Syed Ahmad Alwee Alsree – Group Executive Director of Cahya Mata Sarawak Berhad
- Min-Liang Tan – Co-founder and CEO of Razer USA
- Tan Teck Meng – former professor of accounting at the Singapore Management University (SMU) and member of the Board of Directors of four public companies in Singapore
- Wong Jeh Shyan – former CEO of CommerceNet Singapore, co-founder and former CEO of Ecommerce Gateway Pte. Ltd.
- Yvon Bock – founder and CEO of Hegen.

=== Law ===
- Adrian Tan – lawyer and author
- Andrew Ang – Supreme Court Judge
- Andrew Phang – Supreme Court Judge
- Chan Sek Keong – Chief Justice of Singapore
- Davinder Singh – chief executive officer of Drew & Napier
- Goh Yihan – Supreme Court Justice
- Kan Ting Chiu – Former Supreme Court Judge
- Koh Eng Tian – former solicitor-general, Singapore
- Koh Juat Jong – solicitor-general, Singapore
- K. S. Rajah – former judicial commissioner of the Supreme Court of Singapore
- Lai Kew Chai – Former Supreme Court Judge
- Lucien Wong – Attorney-General, Singapore
- Mahen Gopallawa – Judge of the Court of Appeal of Sri Lanka
- Parinda Ranasinghe Jr. – Attorney General of Sri Lanka
- Sivakant Tiwari – former senior legal officer of the Singapore Legal Service
- Steven Chong – Attorney-General, Singapore
- Sundaresh Menon – Attorney-General, Singapore
- Tan Lee Meng – Supreme Court Judge and former Dean
- Tan Choo Leng – Advocate and solicitor for M/s Wong Partnership
- Tay Yong Kwang – Supreme Court Judge
- V. K. Rajah – Supreme Court Judge
- Walter Woon – David Marshall Professor and former attorney-general of Singapore
- Woo Bih Li – Supreme Court Judge

=== Politics and government ===
- Abdullah Tarmugi – former member of parliament, Singapore
- Abdul Razak Hussein – second prime minister of Malaysia
- Ahmed Inaz – Former minister of finance and treasury of the Maldives
- Alex Au – gay rights activist
- Amy Khor – senior minister of state, former mayor of South West District of Singapore
- Ang Hin Kee – former member of parliament, Singapore
- Ang Wei Neng – Member of Parliament, Singapore
- Ang Yong Guan – former member of Singapore Democratic Party and SingFirst, member of Progress Singapore Party
- Awang Hassan – Fifth State Governor of Penang, Malaysia
- Benjamin Sheares – Second President of Singapore
- Chan Heng Chee – ambassador to United States
- Chay Wai Chuen – High Commissioner to Sri Lanka
- Chen Su Lan – physician, philanthropist, social reformer
- Chia Shi-Lu – former member of parliament, Singapore
- Chia Yong Yong – Singaporean lawyer, disability advocate and a Nominated Member of Parliament of Singapore
- Cynthia Phua – former member of parliament, Singapore
- Daniel Goh – former Non-constituency Member of Parliament, Singapore
- Daren Tang – former chief executive of Intellectual Property Office of Singapore, Director General of the World Intellectual Property Organization
- Denise Phua – Politician and Disability Rights Activist
- E. W. Barker – former member of parliament, politician and lawyer
- Edward Chia – Member of Parliament, Singapore and Timbre founder
- Edwin Tong – Minister of Culture, Community and Youth, Singapore
- Eunice Olsen – former nominated member of parliament, Singapore
- Fahmi Aliman – Member of Parliament, Singapore
- Faizah Jamal – former nominated member of parliament, Singapore
- Geh Min – former nominated member of parliament, Singapore
- Goh Chok Tong – second prime minister of the Republic of Singapore
- Goh Keng Swee – former second deputy prime minister
- Grace Fu – Minister for Sustainability and the Environment, Singapore
- Halimah Yacob – Eighth president of Singapore, former member of parliament, Singapore
- Hetifah Sjaifudian – Member of House of Representatives, Indonesia
- Ho Geok Choo – former member of parliament, Singapore
- Ho Peng Kee – former member of parliament, Singapore
- Hon Sui Sen – former member of parliament and Minister of Finance, Singapore
- Howe Yoon Chong – former Cabinet Minister, Singapore
- Hri Kumar Sangaran – former member of parliament, Singapore
- Indranee Rajah – Member of Parliament, Singapore
- Irene Ng – Former Member of Parliament, Singapore
- James Gomez – Member of Singapore Democratic Party
- Janadas Devan – Chief of Government Communications at the Ministry of Communications and Information, Singapore
- Janice Koh – Actress, former Nominated Member of Parliament, Singapore
- Jessica Tan – Member of Parliament, Singapore
- Josephine Teo – Minister for Manpower, Singapore
- K. Shanmugam – Minister for Law and Home Affairs, Singapore
- Karpal Singh – Malaysian politician and national chairman of the Democratic Action Party
- Khemmani Pholsena – Top aide to the president of Laos and former minister of industry and commerce
- Lam Pin Min – former minister of state in transport and health, Singapore
- Lee Yi Shyan – former member of parliament, Singapore
- Lim Biow Chuan – Member of Parliament, Singapore
- Ling Liong Sik – former minister of transport, Malaysia and president of the Malaysian Chinese Association
- Louis Ng – Member of Parliament, Singapore
- Low Thia Kiang – former secretary general of Workers' Party and Member of Parliament, Singapore
- Mahathir Mohamad – medical doctor, later fourth & seventh Prime Minister of Malaysia
- Muhammad Faishal Ibrahim – Minister of State for Home Affairs, National Development, Singapore
- Ng Eng Hen – Minister for Defence, Singapore
- Noeleen Heyzer – United Nations Under-Secretary-General, Head of UNIFEM
- Nicole Seah – former member of National Solidarity Party, member of Workers' Party
- Ong Keng Yong – Singapore High Commissioner to Malaysia and former ASEAN Secretary-General
- Ong Soh Khim – former nominated member of parliament, Singapore
- Phay Seng Whatt – former chairman of Public Service Commission, Singapore
- Pritam Singh – Member of Parliament, Singapore, Secretary General of Workers' Party and Leader of the Opposition
- Rais Yatim – Minister for Information, Communications and Culture, Malaysia
- S. Jayakumar – former deputy prime minister, Singapore and co-ordinating minister for national security, Singapore and former dean of NUS, Singapore
- S. R. Nathan – Sixth president of Singapore
- Sam Tan – former minister of state for social and family development and foreign affairs, Singapore
- Sebastian Teo – president of National Solidarity Party
- Sha'ari Tadin – former member of parliament, Singapore
- Sharael Taha – Member of Parliament, Singapore
- Simon Tensing de Cruz – Ambassador Extraordinary and Plenipotentiary of the Republic of Singapore to the Russian Federation
- Sim Kee Boon – One of Singapore's pioneer civil servants
- Sin Boon Ann – former member of parliament, Singapore
- Sun Xueling – Minister of State
- Sylvia Lim – Chairman of Workers' Party and Member of Parliament, Singapore
- Steve Chia – Former National Solidarity Party member, Secretary-General of the Singapore People's Party
- Tan Cheng Bock – former member of parliament, Singapore, member of Progress Singapore Party
- Tan Chuan-Jin – Speaker of Parliament, Singapore
- Tan See Leng – Minister for Manpower, Second Minister for Trade and Industry, Singapore
- Tan Soo Khoon – former member of parliament, Singapore
- Teo Ho Pin – former member of parliament, Singapore
- Tin Pei Ling – Member of Parliament, Singapore
- Toh Chin Chye – former deputy prime minister, Singapore
- Tommy Koh – Ambassador-at-Large of Singapore and chairman of the NUS law advisory board; Ramon Magsaysay award winner
- Tony Tan – Seventh president of Singapore and former vice chancellor of the National University of Singapore
- Wong Kan Seng – former deputy prime minister of Singapore
- Vanu Gopala Menon – Permanent Representative of Singapore to the United Nations
- Vivian Balakrishnan – Minister for foreign affairs, Singapore
- Viswa Sadasivan – Nominated member of Parliament, Singapore
- Yaacob Ibrahim – Former minister for communications, Singapore and information and minister-in-charge of Muslim affairs, Singapore, also former faculty member
- Yam Ah Mee – chief executive director of the People's Association
- Yaw Shin Leong – former member of parliament, Singapore
- Yee Jenn Jong – Former Non-constituency Member of Parliament, Singapore
- Yeo Guat Kwang – former member of parliament, Singapore
- Yeo Wan Ling – Member of Parliament, Singapore
- Yip Hon Weng – Member of Parliament, Singapore
- Zainul Abidin – former Member of Parliament, Singapore

=== Academia and education ===
- Louis Chen Hsiao Yun – Tan Chin Tuan Centennial Professor, National University of Singapore
- Chuah Joon Huang – President and CEO of Southern University College
- Colin Cheong – Writer, Teacher
- Freddy Boey – Deputy President and Provost of Nanyang Technological University
- Harry Aveling – Australian scholar, translator and teacher
- Kim-Chuan Toh – Leo Tan Professor in Science, National University of Singapore
- Kishore Mahbubani – Current Dean of Lee Kuan Yew School of Public Policy and former president of United Nations' Security Council
- Mak Joon Wah – Professor of pathology and vice president of International Medical University
- Mary W. S. Wong – Professor at the Franklin Pierce Law Center at the University of New Hampshire
- Nam-Hai Chua – Andrew W. Mellon Professor at Rockefeller University
- Ngiam Tee Liang – Head, Department of Social Work, Faculty of Arts and Social Sciences, National University of Singapore
- Keat Gin Ooi – Malaysian academician and historian at Universiti Brunei Darussalam
- Simon Tay – Singaporean professor, author, and former nominated member of Parliament
- Su Guaning – President Emeritus of Nanyang Technological University
- Teck-Hua Ho – William Halford Jr. Family Professor of Marketing, and the chair of the Marketing Department at the Haas School of Business at the University of California, Berkeley
- Tan Cheng Han – former dean of Faculty of Law at National University of Singapore
- Tan Chorh Chuan – former president of National University of Singapore
- Tan Eng Chye – President of National University of Singapore
- Tan Tai Yong – President of Singapore University of Social Sciences and former president of Yale-NUS College
- Wang Gungwu – Tang Prize Laureate, University Professor of NUS, and former Vice-Chancellor of the University of Hong Kong

=== Medicine and sciences ===
- Aloysius Cheang – Managing Director (Asia-Pacific) for the Cloud Security Alliance
- Anthony Yeo – Counselor
- Balaji Sadasivan – former chairman of the Executive Board of the World Health Organization
- James Seng – Singaporean Internet Pioneer
- Michael Sheetz – Lasker Award winner
- Kanwaljit Soin – Consultant Orthopedic & Hand surgeon
- Mak Joon Wah – Director of the World Health Organization Collaborating Centre for Lymphatic Filariasis
- Margaret Chan – Director General of the World Health Organization
- Miranda Yap – Executive Director of the Bioprocessing Technology Institute at the Agency for Science, Technology and Research
- Kay Tan – contributions to evolutionary multiobjective optimization
- Paul Tambyah – Professor, Infectious Disease expert
- Robert Tan – Physician, Author and Medical Director
- Teo Wan Lin – Dermatologist
- Quek Loo Ming -Former laboratory officer and convicted killer

=== Religion ===
- Kong Hee – Founder of City Harvest Church
- Lawrence Khong – Senior Pastor of Faith Community Baptist Church (FCBC)
- Robert M. Solomon – former Bishop of the Methodist Church in Singapore

=== Sports ===
- Jane Lee – First female from Southeast Asia and the 37th woman in history to have scaled the Seven Summits
- Jasmine Ser – Commonwealth Games gold medalist in shooting
- Ng Ser Miang – Vice-president of the International Olympic Committee
- Wong Meng Kong – Singaporean chess Grandmaster
- U. K. Shyam – Singaporean athlete and current national 100m record holder of Singapore

=== Media and arts ===
- Abigail Sin – Pianist
- Adam Chen – Actor
- Adele Wong – Actress, Screenwriter, Singer
- Alfian Sa'at – Writer, Poet, Playwright
- Andrea Fonseka – Miss Malaysia Universe 2004, Presenter and Actress
- Anjana Vasan - Olivier award winning actress
- Arthur Yap – Poet and painter
- Boey Kim Cheng – Poet
- Celest Chong – Actress
- Chin Han – Actor in The Dark Knight
- Corrinne May – Singaporean Singer
- Cyril Wong – Poet
- Daren Shiau – Writer
- David Loy – American Author
- Desmond Tan – Actor
- Diana Ser – former Channel NewsAsia presenter
- Eelyn Kok – Actress
- Eleanor Wong – Playwright
- Elvin Ng – Actor
- Felicia Chin – Actress
- Genevieve Woo – News Presenter
- Goh Choo San – Ballet Dancer and Choreographer
- Goh Sin Tub – Writer
- Grace Ciao – Fashion illustrator.
- Gwee Li Sui – Poet and Graphic Artist
- Han Sai Por – Singaporean Sculptor
- Haresh Sharma – Playwright
- Ho Ho Ying – Abstract Artist
- Ivan Heng – Actor and Director
- Jacelyn Tay – Actress
- Jeanette Aw – Actress
- J C Sum – Stage Magician
- Jeremiah Choy- Actor and Director
- Joanna Dong – Singer, Actress and Host
- Kaira Gong – Singer
- Kelvin Tong – Director
- Lee Tzu Pheng – Poet
- Lee Wen – Performance Artist
- Liang Wern Fook – Writer and Musician
- Lin Hsin Hsin – Artist
- Lunarin (all members) – Rock band
- Mei Fong – Pulitzer award winning journalist
- Michelle Chong – Actress
- Namiko Chan Takahashi – Artist
- Nelson Chia – Actor
- Nora Samosir – Actress
- Violet Oon – Chef, restaurateur, and food writer
- Ong Keng Sen – Singaporean theater director
- Paige Chua – Actress
- Selena Tan – Actress
- Shawn Lee – Actor
- Shi Xin Hui – Singer and Actress
- Stella Huang – Singer
- Su-Chen Christine Lim – Author
- T. Sasitharan – Producer
- Tay Ping Hui – Actor
- Tung Soo Hua – News Anchor
- Wong May – Poet
- Wong Phui Nam – Poet
- Zhang Zhen Huan – Actor

=== Others ===
- Chia Teck Leng, former manager of Asia Pacific Breweries and convicted white-collar criminal
- Sujay Solomon Sutherson, Singaporean convicted killer

== Notable faculty/former faculty ==
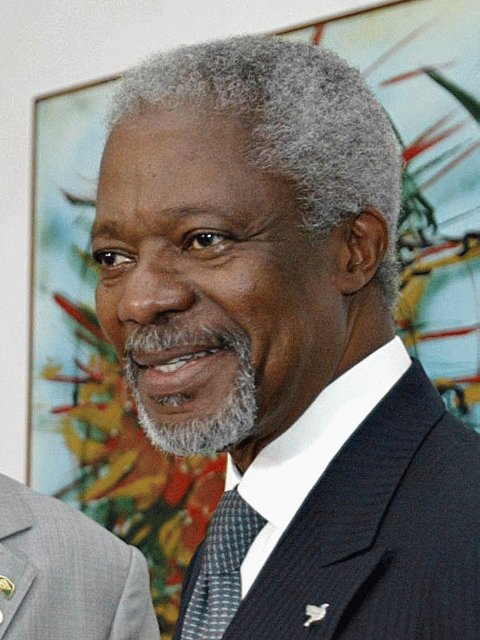
Kofi Annan National University Singapore's first Li Ka Shing Professor.

- Matthew Chang – Professor and Provost's Chair in Medicine at the Synthetic Biology Translational Programme and Department of Biochemistry, Yong Loo Lin School of Medicine
- Andrew Goatly – English language professor at Lingnan University in Hong Kong
- Artur Ekert – One of the inventors of quantum cryptography
- Benjamin Batson – Mathematician and historian
- Berthold-Georg Englert – Known for his early work on quantum optics
- Konstantin Novoselov – Winner of the Nobel Prize in Physics in 2010
- C. Northcote Parkinson – Writer of Bestseller Parkinson's Law
- Chan Heng Chee – former ambassador to the United States
- Chin Tet Yung – Member of Parliament for Sembawang GRC
- Chin Liew Ten – Fellow of the Australian Academy of the Humanities and a Fellow of the Academy of Social Sciences in Australia
- Chong Chi Tat – University Professor and former chairman of Asia Research Institute
- Chua Beng Huat – Cluster Leader of the Cultural Studies in Asia program at Asia Research Institute
- Colin Sheppard – former president of the International Society for Optics Within Life Sciences
- D. J. Enright – British Poet
- Edwin Thumboo – Singaporean Poet
- Hassan Farhangi – Known for his work in the development of Canada's first Smart Microgrid
- Henry Ergas – Regulatory economist who has worked at the OECD, Australian Trade Practices Commission (now the Australian Competition and Consumer Commission) and the Australian Centre of Regulatory Economics (ACORE) Advisory Group
- John Lane Bell – Mathematician and philosopher
- John van Wyhe – Historian of science, with a focus on Charles Darwin and Alfred Russel Wallace
- Kofi Annan – Seventh Secretary-General of the United Nations
- Lalith Athulathmudali – Sri Lankan politician and former Cabinet Minister of Trade, National Security, Agriculture, Education and deputy minister of defence
- Lee Hian Kee – Former Provost's Term Chair Professor and emeritus professor.
- Louis Chen Hsiao Yun – First East Asian to be elected President of the Institute of Mathematical Statistics
- Louxin Zhang – applied mathematician and computational biologist
- M. C. Ricklefs – Indonesian Historian
- Michael Chan, Baron Chan – British Politician, Life peer in the House of Lords
- M. Sornarajah – Author of The International Law on Foreign Investment, the leading text on this area of the law
- Nalin Mehta – Founding Joint Editor of the international peer-reviewed journal South Asian History and Culture
- Paul Abisheganaden – Conductor and Cultural Medallion recipient
- Paul Theroux – American travel writer and novelist
- Prasenjit Duara – Raffles Professor of Humanities at the National University of Singapore and Director of Asian Research Institute and Research in Humanities and Social Sciences
- Richard Friend – IEE's Faraday Medal Awardee
- Roy Yorke Calne – British surgeon and pioneer of organ transplantation
- Simon Chesterman – Rhodes Scholar and former "Global Professor and Director" of the Singaporean branch of the NYU School of Law
- Sit Kim Ping – Biochemist and Emeritus Professor at the Department of Biochemistry
- Stephanie Wehner – Co-discovered that the amount of non-locality in quantum mechanics is limited by the uncertainty principle
- Susan C. Aldridge – former professor (1991-1994). Senior Vice President of Drexel University's online learning (2013-).
- Thio Li-Ann – Singaporean law professor and nominated member of parliament
- Wee Teck Gan – Distinguished Professor of Mathematics, known for the Gan–Gross–Prasad conjecture in the theory of automorphic forms, recipient of President's Science Award 2017
- Wolfgang Drechsler – Lee Kuan Yew School of Public Policy, expert on Non-Western Public Administration and Management
- Brenda Yeoh – Winner of the 2021 Vautrin Lud Prize
- Young-Tae Chang – Professor of Chemistry at Pohang University of Science and Technology
- Zuowei Shen – Tan Chin Tuan Centennial Professor and fellow of the World Academy of Sciences (TWAS)
