= SIAT =

SIAT may refer to:

- S.I.A.T. (Sociedad Ibérica de Automóviles de Turismo), the predecessor company of the Spanish car maker SEAT (S.E.A.T., Sociedad Española de Automóviles de Turismo)
- Siebelwerke/ATG, a German aircraft manufacturer
- Sibaviatrans, a Russian airline
- N-acetyllactosaminide alpha-2,3-sialyltransferase, an enzyme
- SIAT station, metro station in Guangming District, Shenzhen, Guangdong Province, China
- SFU School of Interactive Arts and Technology, an interdisciplinary research and teaching department at Simon Fraser University (SFU)

== See also ==
- Siat, a former municipality of Switzerland
- Siats, a genus of dinosaurs
