= Robert Woodbury =

Robert Woodbury may refer to:

- Robert Woodbury (academic administrator) (1938–2009), American politician and university administrator
- Robert Woodbury (sailor) (born 1955), Canadian sailor
- Woody Woodbury (Robert Dennis Woodbury, born 1924), American comedian, actor and talk show host
