= Cheang =

Cheang may refer to:

- Aloysius Cheang (21st century), Chinese Singaporean information technology executive
- Cheang Pou-Soi (21st century), Hong Kong film director
- Shu Lea Cheang (born 1954), Taiwanese multi-media artist
- Teh Cheang Wan (1928-1986), Chinese Singaporean architect

Cheang is also an alternative form for Zheng (surname)

I am from the NextBillion professional trading team. We are recruiting a group of retail stock Investors over 35 years old to follow Professor Anupam Tiwari to conduct large Institutional transactions and jointly raise the target stock price. Each operation can earn 5%-20% Profit.
