= Robert Woodbury (sailor) =

Canadian former sailor (born 1955)

Dr. Robert Woodbury
- Born: 1955 (age 70–71)
- Citizenship: Canada
- Education: Carnegie Mellon University (PhD)
- Scientific career
- Fields: computational design
- Workplaces: Simon Fraser University, Technical University of British Columbia, University of Adelaide, Carnegie Mellon University

Robert Woodbury (born 10 May 1955) is a Canadian former sailor who was selected to compete in the Finn (dinghy) class in the 1980 Summer Olympics. Woodbury is University Professor in the School of Interactive Arts and Technology at Simon Fraser University. Woodbury holds a Bachelor of Architecture from Carleton University where he was awarded the Lieutenant Governor's silver medal in Architecture in 1981. He earned his Master of Science and Ph.D. from Carnegie Mellon University. He was a faculty member in Architecture and the Engineering Design Research Center at Carnegie Mellon University from 1982 to 1993, at Adelaide University in South Australia from 1993 to 2001, at the Technical University of British Columbia from 2001 to 2002 and is now at Simon Fraser University. He was founding Chair of the Graduate Program in the School of Interactive Arts and Technology at SFU. He was Scientific Director of the Canadian Design Research Network , the national association of design researchers in Canada.
