= Yvon Bock =

Singaporean entrepreneur

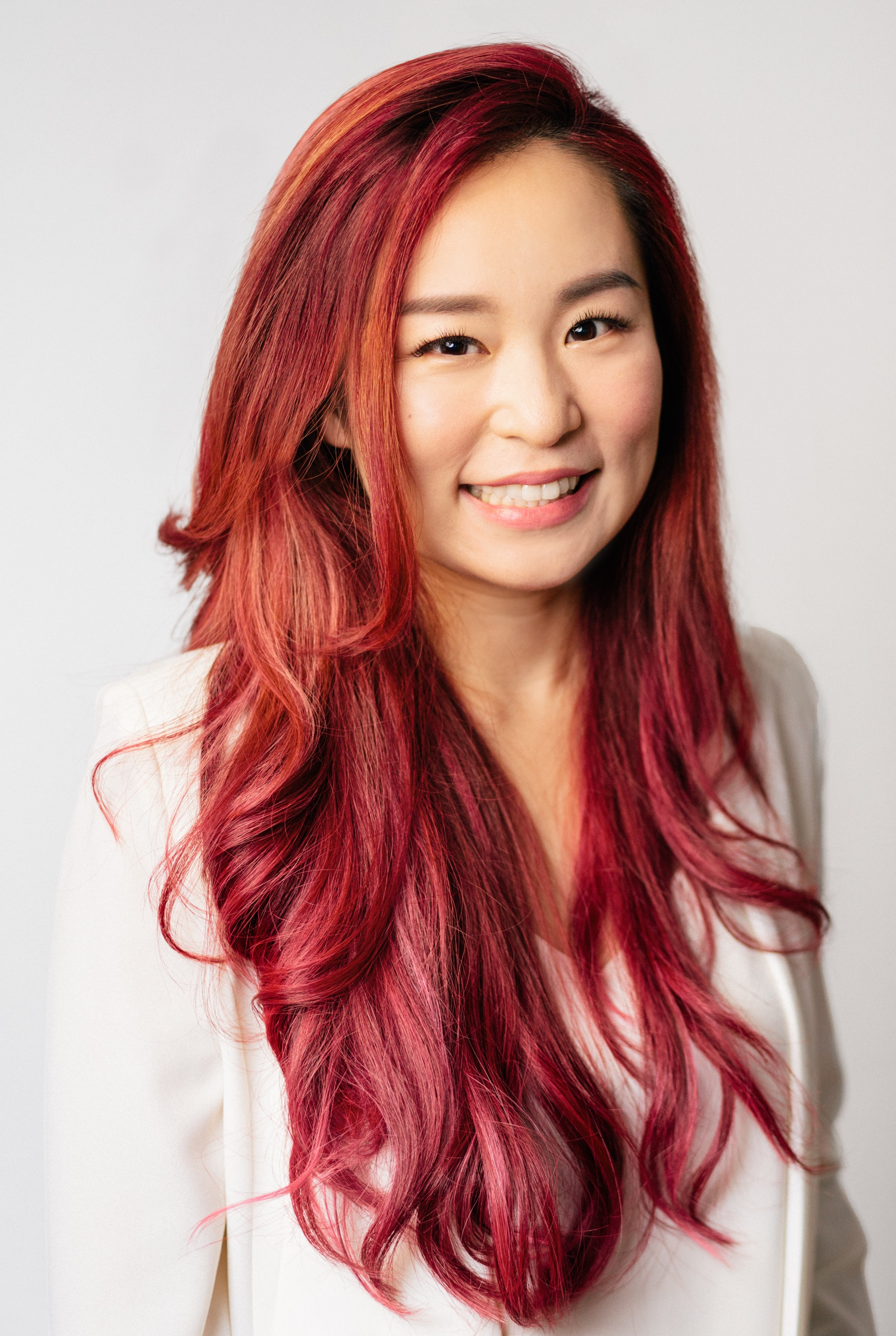
Yvon Bock

Yvon Bock (born 1 January 1979, Singapore) is an entrepreneur, founder and CEO of Hegen, that provides baby and nursing products for breastfeeding mothers. Bock founded Hegen in 2015 to simplify the processes of expressing, storing, and feeding breastmilk. In 2021, Prime Minister Lee Hsien Loong recognized her as one of the everyday heroes at the National Day Rally for her contributions during the COVID-19 pandemic.

== Early life and education ==
Bock was born on 1 January 1979, in Singapore. Her father, Chan Ching, is the managing director of plastics contract manufacturer Fitson Singapore, a sister company of Hegen.

She attended Anderson Junior College and later pursued a degree in Computational Finance and Mathematics at the National University of Singapore. She also completed a Fashion Design course at the Nanyang Academy of Fine Arts (NAFA).

== Career ==
Bock began her career in sales and marketing at Deutsche Asset Management Group Limited, where she worked from August 2000 to August 2004. Later, she joined her father part-time at Fitson and enrolled in a Fashion Design course at NAFA, sponsored by her father, with the intention of her joining Fitson upon completion of her course.

Bock became an International Board-Certified Lactation Consultant (IBCLC).

In 2014, Bock founded Hegen, a company dedicated to enhancing the nursing experience for mothers. The brand name "Hegen" is derived from the German idiom "hegen und pflegen". Bock started advocating for breastfeeding, protecting the integrity of breastmilk, and simplifying the process of expressing, storing, and feeding. The company operates in 24 international markets.

In 2021, Bock opened the Hegen Experiential Centre amidst the COVID-19 pandemic, offering parents a holistic experience with products, education, and customer service. The same year, Bock established the Hegen Lactation Centre, providing professional expertise and science-backed information through International Board-Certified Lactation Consultants and maternal specialists.

== Awards and honours ==
In 2016, Bock won the Great Women of Our Time award in the Finance & Commerce Category from Singapore Women's Weekly.

In July 2018, Bock was the Overall Winner of the Nova Category at the Woman Entrepreneur Award by S. AUXANO. Also, in October 2019, she received the SOE Award from the Spirit of Enterprise. In October 2020, Bock received the Silver Stevie Award by The Stevie Awards.

In November 2021, she was honored with the 'Asia's Women Empowerment Award' by Fortune Times.

Yvon Bock received the EY Entrepreneur Of The Year 2023 Singapore and the EY Entrepreneur Of The Year 2023 – Consumer Products awards and represented Singapore at the EY World Entrepreneur Of The Year 2024 in Monte Carlo, Monaco in June 2024.

== Philanthropy ==
In 2018, Bock partnered with Safe Place for "Hegen | Safe Place: The Best Gift Edition," supporting pregnant women and their families by conducting annual workshops, offering education and advice on breastfeeding.

In 2020, under the initiative Hegen Cares, Bock donated 1000 Hegen PCTO Express Store Feed Kits to frontline pregnant workers handling COVID-19 cases.

In 2023, through the Breastfeeding Ally@Work program, Bock collaborated with companies to implement family-friendly practices and facilities, promoting breastfeeding in the workplace. Bock is a member of the Alliance for Action to Strengthen Marriages & Family Relationships (AFAM).

== Personal life ==
Bock is married to Leon Bock, co-founder and Chief Operating Officer of Hegen. They have four children.
