= Louxin Zhang =

Canadian computational biologist

Academic background
- Education: Lanzhou University; University of Waterloo

Academic work
- Discipline: Applied mathematics Computational biology
- Institutions: National University of Singapore
- Website: https://discovery.nus.edu.sg/822-louxin-zhang

Louxin Zhang is a Canadian computational biologist and mathematician. He is a professor in the Department of Mathematics at the National University of Singapore.

His research interests include computational biology, bioinformatics, and discrete mathematics.His work has examined topics in combinatorial semigroup theory as well as mathematical approaches to phylogenetic trees and phylogenetic networks. Zhang has also contributed to research on spaced seeds used in sequence comparison methods within bioinformatics.

== Early life ==
Louxin Zhang was raised in Luoyang, Henan, China. He completed his undergraduate and master's degrees in mathematics at Lanzhou University. He later moved to Canada to pursue doctoral studies in computer science at the University of Waterloo. Zhang received his Ph.D. in computer science from the University of Waterloo with a dissertation titled "Emulations and Embeddings of Meshes of Trees and Hypercubes of Cliques.

== Career ==
After completing postdoctoral research under Ming Li, Zhang began his independent research career in 1996 at the Institute of Systems Sciences, now part of the Institute for Infocomm Research. In 1997, he was awarded a three-year Lee Kuan Yew Postdoctoral Fellowship.

During his research career, Zhang has worked on topics in theoretical computer science and computational biology. His studies have introduced the application of string rewriting techniques to the word problem and conjugacy problem in special monoids. He has also conducted research on phylogenetic trees and phylogenetic networks, including work on the tree component decomposition method developed with collaborators.

Zhang’s work has additionally examined evolutionary models involving gene loss, gene duplication, and incomplete lineage sorting. The technique has been used to study problems related to tree containment, the exact and asymptotic counting of tree-child networks, and methods for inferring minimum phylogenies. His research has also addressed spaced seeds for sequence comparison and methods for reconstructing ancestral genome sequences.

== Selected publications ==
Zhang has authored and co-authored a number of publications in the fields of computational biology, phylogenetics, and algorithm design. Selected works include:

- Zhang L. 1991. Conjugacy in special monoids. Journal of Algebra 143: 487-497.
- Zhang, Louxin (November 2011). "From Gene Trees to Species Trees II: Species Tree Inference by Minimizing Deep Coalescence Events". IEEE/ACM Transactions on Computational Biology and Bioinformatics. 8 (6): 1685–1691. Bibcode:2011ITCBB...8.1685Z. doi:10.1109/TCBB.2011.83. ISSN 1557-9964. PMID 21576759. S2CID 226872.
- Zheng, Yu; Zhang, Louxin (2017-08-17). "Reconciliation With Nonbinary Gene Trees Revisited". Journal of the ACM. 64 (4): 24:1–24:28. doi:10.1145/3088512. ISSN 0004-5411. S2CID 7715566.
- Gunawan, Andreas D. M.; DasGupta, Bhaskar; Zhang, Louxin (2017-02-01). "A decomposition theorem and two algorithms for reticulation-visible networks". Information and Computation. 252: 161–175. doi:10.1016/j.ic.2016.11.001. ISSN 0890-5401.
- Zhang, Louxin; Abhari, Niloufar; Colijn, Caroline; Wu, Yufeng (2023-01-03). "A Fast and Scalable Method for Inferring Phylogenetic Networks from Trees by Aligning Lineage Taxon Strings". arXiv:2301.00992 [q-bio.PE].
