= Jeremiah Choy =

Singaporean actor, writer, director and choreographer

Jeremiah Choy is an actor, writer, director and choreographer.

Choy is a trained lawyer who went full-time into directing, acting, writing and choreography in 1997. Since 1988, he has performed and toured in many critically acclaimed productions with TheatreWorks. He was part of the Best Actor (Ensemble) in the Descendents of the Eunuch Admiral in the Cairo International Festival of Experimental Theatre in 1996.

== Career ==
=== Directing ===
Choy directed various productions such as A Broadway Christmas Carol and Machine, where he was nominated the best Director for the DBS Life! Theatre Awards in 2002. He also produced and co-directed Margaret Chan in Emily of Emerald Hill in Singapore Arts Festival 2010, and directed The Conference of the Birds for Singapore Arts Festival 2011.

In addition, he directed and co-wrote DragonTales, which premiered in Manila in 2010. He helmed the Play Den Productions, a joint venture with the Arts House, which is a platform for Singapore works. He directed ChildAid in 2011, and will be directing ChildAid 2012 at the Marina Bay Sands Grand Theatre. He has been a resident Judge of the Singapore Youth Festival's Drama Competition since 2000. He directed Selamat for Spotlight Singapore in Cape Town 2011 and Living Dreams for Spotlight Singapore in Bratislava and Prague 2012. He has just curated and wrote for this year's NS45: Fathers and Sons, and co-curated for four hubs Singapore Heritage Festival 2012: Jurong Point, Bugis, Century Square and 112 Katong.

He had directed The Swing Thing, the closing show for NUS Arts Festival in March 2013.

He was the Artistic Programme Director for the Social Functions of World Bank IMF 2006 and APEC 2009 and is currently the Artistic Director for p.L.a.Y!, a Young NTUC's performing arts group. Choy was awarded the inaugural Outstanding Kent Ridge Hall Alumni award in 2010.

Choy founded the Orangedot Group of Companies comprising Orangedot Productions Pte Ltd, Orangedot Entertainment Pte Ltd, Orangedot Management Pte Ltd and Orangedot Talents Pte Ltd. The four companies complement and complete the services in the arts and entertainment industry from providing consultancy and production to looking after the needs of the people in the industry. He was also founding member and President of the Association of Singapore Actors.

=== Teaching ===
Choy has various stints of teaching at several educational institutes in Singapore. He had taught at National University of Singapore Department of Theatre Studies, Nanyang Academy of Fine Arts, LASALLE College of the Arts and Singapore Management University School of Social Sciences.

In 2015, Choy was the creative director of Sing50, a concert to honour 50 years of Singapore music.
