= Robert Tan =

American physician and academic specializing in geriatrics and men's health

Robert S. Tan
- Education: Case Western Reserve University
- Occupations: Physician, academic, author
- Known for: Research and writing on aging men's health, androgen deficiency and testosterone therapy
- Medical career
- Institutions: McGovern Medical School; Baylor College of Medicine
- Sub-specialties: Geriatrics, family medicine, men's health

Robert S. Tan is a physician, academic, and author specializing in geriatrics and men's health. His clinical and academic work has focused on aging in men, androgen deficiency, testosterone replacement therapy, erectile dysfunction, and the possible relationship between androgens and cognitive function.

Tan has written books and peer-reviewed articles concerning the concept of andropause, testosterone therapy, male sexual health, and aging. He has also been quoted by major newspapers including The Washington Post and The New York Times in coverage of men's health and sex differences in medical research.

== Early life and education ==
After medical school, he subsequently completed residency training in internal and family medicine and undertook fellowship training in geriatric medicine at Hammersmith Hospital and the Royal Postgraduate Medical School (now Imperial College) in London and at institutions affiliated with Case Western Reserve University in Ohio.He later earned a Master of Business Administration with a concentration in health administration.

== Academic and medical career ==
Tan has held academic and clinical appointments in Houston, Texas. He is Professor at McGovern Medical School at the University of Texas Health Science Center at Houston, where his clinical interests include geriatrics.

Earlier in his career, he was affiliated with Baylor College of Medicine, the Michael E. DeBakey Veterans Affairs Medical Center, and other Houston-area medical institutions. These affiliations are documented in his peer-reviewed publications as well as contemporary newspaper coverage.

A 2001 Houston Chronicle article described Tan as an international academic specialist in geriatric medicine and a professor at the University of Texas Medical School at Houston.

== Men's health and andropause ==
Tan became associated with research and public discussion concerning the concept of andropause, a term used to describe age-related changes in male androgen levels. His 2001 book, The Andropause Mystery: Unraveling Truths About the Male Menopause, addressed the physical, sexual, psychological, and cognitive issues that he associated with aging and declining androgen levels.

A contemporary Houston Chronicle article about andropause described Tan's treatment of an older patient with testosterone replacement therapy and identified him as the author of The Andropause Mystery.

The concept of andropause has been debated within medicine, including questions concerning whether age-related changes in testosterone should be regarded as a distinct clinical syndrome. Tan's publications contributed to this discussion by examining androgen deficiency and testosterone replacement in aging men.

A scholarly historical study of the development of the concept of male menopause identified Tan as one of the physicians who became associated with advocating the concept of andropause.

== Research ==
Tan's peer-reviewed research has addressed androgen deficiency, testosterone replacement, erectile dysfunction, cardiovascular health, and cognition in aging men.

=== Testosterone replacement ===
In 2003, Tan et al published an integrative review of the evidence for testosterone replacement therapy in aging men. The authors discussed potential benefits, limitations, and risks of treatment and concluded that further research was needed before routine androgen replacement could be recommended for aging men.

In 2004, Tan et al a review concerning the recognition and diagnosis of androgen deficiency in aging men.

=== Cardiovascular research ===
In 2015, Tan et al published a study in the International Journal of Endocrinology examining myocardial infarction and stroke among men receiving injectable testosterone therapy. The study used data from patients treated at Low T Centers in the United States and compared observed event rates with population-based registries.

The study reported that the observed incidence of myocardial infarction and stroke among the testosterone-treated patients was lower than rates reported in the comparison registries. The authors concluded that testosterone therapy was not associated with an increased risk of these outcomes in the population studied.

The findings represented one observational contribution to a broader and subsequently controversial body of research concerning the cardiovascular safety of testosterone therapy.

=== Cognitive health ===
Tan has also investigated possible relationships between androgen levels and cognitive function. In a 2007 review in the Journal of Alzheimer's Disease, examined evidence concerning the possible role of androgens in the etiology of Alzheimer's disease in aging men and discussed potential therapeutic interventions.

His research has also examined memory loss and cognitive symptoms reported by men undergoing age-related hormonal changes.

=== Erectile dysfunction ===
Tan has published on the relationship between aging and erectile dysfunction. In 2012, he co-authored a study in the American Journal of Men's Health examining the implications of increasing age for erectile dysfunction.

His earlier publications also examined treatment options for erectile dysfunction and androgen deficiency in aging men.

=== Estrogen and testosterone therapy ===
In 2015, Tan et al published a study in the American Journal of Men's Health examining elevated estrogen levels among men receiving injectable testosterone therapy. The study analyzed clinical data from thousands of men treated at Low T Centers in the United States.

== Public advocacy and media ==
Tan has participated in public discussions about men's health and differences in health outcomes between men and women.

In 2004, The Washington Post quoted Tan in an article about the development of a Center for Sex Differences at Georgetown University. The article discussed the historical emphasis on women's health research and the emerging movement toward research examining sex differences in medicine. Tan, then identified as an associate professor at Baylor College of Medicine, argued for greater attention to men's health research.

In 2006, The New York Times quoted Tan in an article by Roni Rabin examining disparities in men's health and asking why men historically received less dedicated health research and public-health attention.

The quotation from the New York Times article was subsequently discussed by Our Bodies Ourselves in a commentary on the gender gap in health outcomes.

A 2010 Star Tribune article about "male menopause" also identified Tan as the author of The Andropause Mystery and founder of the OPAL Medical Clinic and discussed his views on testosterone deficiency in aging men.

== Books ==
- The Andropause Mystery: Unraveling Truths About the Male Menopause. AMRED Publishing, 2001. ISBN 978-0-9707061-0-2.
- Aging Men's Health: A Case-Based Approach. Thieme Medical Publishers, 2005. ISBN 978-1-58890-296-2.

== Professional organizations ==
Tan has been associated with professional organizations concerned with men's health and aging. A Men's Health Network media release from 2004 identified him as a member of its advisory board and listed his specialties as andropause and aging.

He has also served on the editorial board of the American Journal of Men's Health.

== Selected publications ==
- Tan, Robert S.; Culberson, John W. (2003). "An integrative review on current evidence of testosterone replacement therapy for the andropause." Maturitas. 45 (1): 15–27. doi:10.1016/S0378-5122(03)00083-5. PMID 12753940.
- Tan, Robert S. (2003). "Novel treatment options for overlapping yet distinct erectile dysfunction and andropause syndromes." Current Opinion in Investigational Drugs. 4 (4): 435–438. PMID 12808883.
- Tan, Robert S.; Pu, Shou-Jin (2004). "Is it andropause? Recognizing androgen deficiency in aging men." Postgraduate Medicine. 115 (1): 62–66. doi:10.3810/pgm.2004.01.1419. PMID 14755879.
- Fuller, Stephanie J.; Tan, Robert S.; Martins, Ralph N. (2007). "Androgens in the etiology of Alzheimer's disease in aging men and possible therapeutic interventions." Journal of Alzheimer's Disease. 12 (2): 129–142. doi:10.3233/JAD-2007-12202. PMID 17917157.
- Wagle, Kamal C.; Carrejo, Maurita H.; Tan, Robert S. (2012). "The implications of increasing age on erectile dysfunction." American Journal of Men's Health. 6 (4): 273–279. doi:10.1177/1557988311431629. PMID 22398995.
- Tan, Robert S.; Cook, Kelly R.; Reilly, William G. (2015). "Myocardial Infarction and Stroke Risk in Young Healthy Men Treated with Injectable Testosterone." International Journal of Endocrinology. 2015: 970750. doi:10.1155/2015/970750. PMID 26124832.
- Tan, Robert S.; Cook, Kelly R.; Reilly, William G. (2015). "High estrogen in men after injectable testosterone therapy: the low T experience." American Journal of Men's Health. 9 (3): 229–234. doi:10.1177/1557988314539000. PMID 24928451.
