= Technical University of British Columbia =

- Motto: Infinite possibilities
- Type: Public University
- Established: 1999, dissolved 2002
- Location: Canada; 49.186°N 122.850°W
- Colors: Blue and Orange

The Technical University of British Columbia (TechBC) was a special-purpose university in Surrey, British Columbia, Canada, that operated from 1999 until 2002, when it was closed by the British Columbia government. Its students and programs were transferred to Simon Fraser University to become the core of SFU Surrey and the School of Interactive Arts and Technology.

== Establishment ==
The roots of TechBC were in demand from Fraser Valley residents for a full-service university in the region. In 1991, the Fraser Valley University Society was formed to organize public pressure toward this goal. (In light of later events, one of its first actions was to lobby SFU president William Saywell to open a satellite campus in the region.)

The policy of both Social Credit and New Democratic Party (NDP) governments of the day was to grant degree-granting status to the existing post-secondary institutions in the region, today's Kwantlen Polytechnic University and University of the Fraser Valley. By the mid-1990s, however, the ability of these institutions to keep up with rapid population growth was increasingly in question. Of greater concern was the Fraser Valley's abysmally low university participation rate—a rate that contributed to BC's ninth-place standing among Canadian provinces on this factor.

Public opinion polling and the skills-development policies of the Mike Harcourt government led the province to announce, on 2 February 1995, the establishment of a free-standing technical university, to be located on a $100-million campus in Cloverdale. Legislation for the new institution, Technical University of British Columbia Act, was passed in July 1997. Controversially, the Technical University of British Columbia Act did not provide for an academic senate, a standard feature of faculty curriculum control in other universities. This, coupled with news that the new university would operate without tenure, led to a year-long boycott by the Canadian Association of University Teachers.

== Academic programs ==
Although its initial charter suggested TechBC's involvement in a range of applied fields, a pronounced shift under the Glen Clark government led it to pursue specifically high-tech program offerings, in keeping with the economic climate of the times. The institution pursued an "integrated learning" approach, combining heavy use of on-line learning with mixed face-to-face course structures.

All students underwent a common, intensive first-year program called TechOne, which emphasized core artistic, technical, mathematical, and communication skills. Students completing TechOne could continue in any of TechBC's offerings, but the TechOne program was generally not transferable to other institutions—a problem that would plague the university in its student-recruitment efforts.

Three program streams were offered at the university's September 1999 launch. Perhaps the most innovative, Interactive Arts focused on the use of computers and technology in the development of art, design, and "new media". The Information Technology program was conceived as a hybrid of traditional computer engineering and computer science programs. Management and Technology was designed to integrate traditional business curriculum with content specific to the management of high-technology industries and also the technical skills required for work in that field.

In its short life, TechBC managed to recruit some talent. The new university scored a major coup when it hired prominent SFU computer scientist Tom Calvert as its vice president, Research and External Relations. Moreover, Professor Alice Mansell, a prominent academic leader and artist, joined TechBC as its first Vice President, Academic. Mansell brought fresh ideas and management into TechBC, reorganizing TechBC's academic leadership into a non-discipline based Academic Planning and Academic Operations. She recruited Professor Hassan Farhangi, an industry and academic veteran as Dean, Academic Operations, and Professor Ron Wakkary, a visionary artist, as Dean, Academic Planning. This innovative academic structure helped TechBC develop a full inter-disciplinary undergraduate program, called TechOne, and deliver components of it as the rest were being built. The success of this efficient and concurrent development was in part attributed to an innovative curriculum development and delivery workflow which Professor Farhangi developed and implemented. Other prominent names who joined TechBC later included Michael Gurstein, Amir Asif, John Bowes, Steve diPaola, Thecla Schiphorst, Michael Dobson, Robert Woodbury and V-chip inventor Tim Collings.

== Campus ==
Although the February 1995 announcement placed TechBC on provincially owned land in Cloverdale, the impracticality of that site from an urban and transportation perspective became readily apparent. The City of Surrey offered a 12-acre (49,000 m^{2}) parcel of land in Whalley, the economic centre of the municipality, leading to a July 1998 announcement that TechBC would receive an urban campus adjacent to Surrey Place Mall instead of the cow pasture previously announced.

Meanwhile, however, the property-development arm of the provincial auto insurer, the Insurance Corporation of British Columbia (ICBC), had quietly acquired the mall next door. ICBC president and NDP operative Bob Williams approached the provincial government with an ambitious scheme: the construction of a three-storey galleria above the mall and a twenty-storey landmark office tower, designed by Vancouver architect Bing Thom. TechBC would occupy the galleria and tower podium, while ICBC would move its corporate offices to the tower. The scheme was seen not only as revitalization for the depressed urban core of Surrey, but as a way to take the new university's capital costs "off-book," by financing them through ICBC, which would charge an annual rent to the university. Instead of the $100 million in capital costs promised by the government, TechBC was obliged to pay $426,000 a month to ICBC for its campus, an amount totalling over $178 million over the 25-year term after additional charges were included. While many in the university expressed concern over this arrangement, the final decisions—and the ultimate source of virtually all the university's funding—rested in Victoria.

The building project was ultimately a major liability for TechBC. The incoming BC Liberal government of Gordon Campbell used the project to smear the NDP, which it trounced in the 2001 election and which was tarnished by the fast ferry scandal and other megaprojects gone wrong. The university's lease payments also skewed comparisons with other institutions, all of which had pre-existing 'gifted' capital assets and buildings. Delay in completion of the university's permanent facilities, occasioned by the ICBC project, also reduced the rate at which TechBC could take in students, leading to allegations that it was not meeting enrollment targets.

TechBC never occupied its permanent facilities in the "Central City" development. At the time of its closure in 2002, it remained in leased 'betaspace' premises in a former Zellers store at Surrey Place Mall. In 2004, Premier Gordon Campbell announced that SFU would occupy the much-maligned facility after all. SFU moved into the new space in September 2006.

== Closure ==
Upon taking office in 2001, the BC Liberal government initiated a "Core Services Review" designed to identify savings in support of a 10% cut in government expenditures. Almost immediately, incoming Advanced Education Minister Shirley Bond initiated a review of TechBC's future. While TechBC prepared a series of business plans, each more aggressive than the last, deputy minister Gerry Armstrong solicited proposals from other BC post-secondary institutions. Simon Fraser University was the first to express its interest, and ultimately was best able to provide the province with a political "win" in the otherwise politically disastrous closure of the only university in the vote-rich Fraser Valley region.

As ultimately developed, SFU agreed to accept all existing TechBC students, and to operate a Surrey campus on a permanent basis. It continued the Interactive Arts and Information Technology programs on the Surrey site, while the Management and Technology students were streamed into its Faculty of Business at its main campus on the Burnaby Mountain. Although the government later funded expansion plans, the initial agreement involved expansion to only 860 FTEs, a fraction of the 2353 proposed by TechBC in its final business plan.

Despite last-minute rumours that TechBC would merge with Kwantlen University College, the final announcement was made at a televised "Open Cabinet" press conference on 7 February 2002. The government announcement compared TechBC's situation with its 1998 academic plan, ignoring the burden placed on the university with the building project and its delay in providing permanent teaching and research space.

Transition arrangements proceeded quickly, and TechBC officially closed at the end of July 2002, after three waves of layoffs. SFU ultimately hired most of the teaching staff, and some middle-level administrators and support people. SFU Surrey opened in September 2002, initially with essentially the same campus and programs as its predecessor.
