= Matthew Chang =

Korean American synthetic biologist

- Education: Seoul National University University of Maryland
- Occupations: Synthetic biologist; biochemist; university teacher; scientist
- Scientific career
- Fields: Synthetic biology, Metabolic engineering
- Workplaces: National University of Singapore Nanyang Technological University University of Maryland Biotechnology Institute U.S. Environmental Protection Agency
- Website: https://medicine.nus.edu.sg/bch/faculty/chang-matthew/

Matthew Wook Chang is a Korean American synthetic biologist based in Singapore. He is a Provost's Chair Professor at the Yong Loo Lin School of Medicine, National University of Singapore. Chang's research centers on engineering microorganisms and synthetic genetic systems for biomedical and biomanufacturing applications.

== Education ==
Chang received his B.S. in Chemical and Biological Engineering from Seoul National University and his PhD in Chemical and Biomolecular Engineering from the University of Maryland.

== Career and research ==
After completing his PhD, Chang worked as a postdoctoral research associate at the Office of Pesticide Programs of the U.S. Environmental Protection Agency. He later served as a research assistant professor at the University of Maryland Biotechnology Institute's Center for Biosystems Research. He subsequently joined Nanyang Technological University (NTU) as an Assistant Professor and later moved to the National University of Singapore (NUS).

At NUS, Chang serves as Director of the NUS Synthetic Biology for Clinical and Technological Innovation (SynCTI), which is the university's focal synthetic biology research program. Concurrently, he also serves as the Wilmar–NUS Corporate Laboratory (WIL@NUS), a research partnership between NUS and the agribusiness company Wilmar International Limited, and the Singapore Consortium for Synthetic Biology (SINERGY), an initiative that promotes research collaborations across academia, industry, and government. He serves as Executive Director of the National Centre for Engineering Biology (NCEB), Singapore.

Chang's research focuses on engineering microorganisms and synthetic genetic systems to develop autonomous, programmable cells capable of performing defined functions in complex biological environments. He developed engineered Escherichia coli capable of detecting and eliminating Pseudomonas aeruginosa, demonstrating programmable pathogen-targeting bacteria. He subsequently reported engineered commensal E. coli capable of inhibiting Clostridioides difficile infection, a leading cause of healthcare-associated infectious diarrhoea worldwide.

Beyond infectious disease, Chang and his colleagues have engineered commensal bacteria that selectively target colorectal cancer cells by converting a compound naturally found in cruciferous vegetables into a bioactive anticancer agent.

In 2025, Chang and colleagues reported engineered nasal commensals capable of transporting therapeutic payloads from the nasal cavity to the brain, demonstrating a microbial platform for targeted nose-to-brain drug delivery. In 2026, Chang and colleagues developed engineered Lactobacillus plantarum strains that simultaneously regulate multiple metabolites along the gut-liver-brain axis, demonstrating a modular and responsive microbial therapeutic platform for restoring metabolic homeostasis in complex disorders.

He co-founded the Asian Synthetic Biology Association (ASBA) and the Global Biofoundry Alliance (GBA). He served as Co-Chair of the World Economic Forum's Global Future Council on Synthetic Biology (2023–2025) and currently serves as Co-Chair of its Global Future Council on Generative Biology.

== Awards ==
- National Research Foundation Investigatorship Award (2019)
- NUHS-Mochtar Riady Pinnacle Research Excellence Award (2019)
- Presidential Award, Korean Federation of Science and Technology Societies (2019)
- Scientific and Technological Achievement Award, U.S. Environmental Protection Agency (2007)
