= Tan Teck Meng =

Singaporean academic (died 2011)

- Died: 7 July 2011; Singapore
- Citizenship: Singaporean
- Education: University of New South Wales; University of Singapore
- Awards: Public Service Medal; Service to Education Award; Most Inspiring Teacher; Most Outstanding Teacher
- Scientific career
- Fields: Accounting, Business
- Workplaces: Singapore Management University

This is a Chinese name; the family name is Tan.

Tan Teck Meng was a professor of Accounting from Singapore Management University (SMU), member of the board of directors of four public companies in Singapore, serving as chairman of the audit committees of two of the companies, and honorary professor of Finance and Economics of Dongbei University of Finance and Economics, China.

He was the first appointee of SMU, being its first deputy president and provost respectively, and former dean of the School of Accountancy and Business (now Nanyang Business School) at Nanyang Technological University (NTU) where he was instrumental in the development of the school and the establishment of a number undergraduate degrees and MBA programmes.

== Biography ==
=== Education and academic career ===
Tan graduated with a Bachelor of Accountancy from University of Singapore, now National University of Singapore (NUS), and a Master of Commerce with Honours from the University of New South Wales. Upon graduation in 1970, he worked in Charted Industries Pte Ltd, now ST Kinetics, and General Electric (USA) Television and Appliance Pte Ltd before joining the faculty of University of Singapore in 1972.

He subsequently worked at Nanyang Technological University, serving as dean of its School of Accountancy and Business (now Nanyang Business School) from 1990 to 1998. During his tenure as dean, Tan transformed the former accountancy school into a full-fledged business school through the establishment of specialized undergraduate degrees, and certain MBA and PhD programmes. In addition, he founded the Journal of Enterprising Culture, serving as its editor in chief, and set up the NTU Entrepreneurship Development Centre in 1988, which served to provide consulting and training programmes to small and medium-sized enterprises.

In 1996, Tan was awarded an Honorary PhD by Liaoning University, China, and appointed honorary professor of finance and economics of Dongbei University and of Liaoning Administration College, respectively, in China. In 2001, he was appointed a visiting professor to Cranfield University, UK.

In 1997, he was appointed chairman of a task force that aimed to study the setting up of Singapore's first private university, Singapore Management University. He eventually became the university's first appointee, provost and deputy president, respectively. As one of the "original eleven" faculty of SMU, Tan "built up the staff side from scratch [and] spearheaded continuous and overlapping campus development projects with ambitious time lines".

After SMU was established, Tan moved on to become one of the most highly regarded professors in the school, with The Straits Times nominating him as one of six "star professors" of SMU in its Scholar's Choice series of articles, which serves as a guide to tertiary education.

=== Other community and corporate activities ===
Professor Tan was a member of the Council on Corporate Disclosure and Governance which sets accounting and disclosure standards in Singapore. He also chaired the KK Women's and Children's Hospital's Medifund Committee, the Singapore National Committee for Pacific Economic Cooperation, and the Meridian Junior College advisory committee. He was also a member of the board of directors of four Singapore listed companies, serving as chairman of the Audit Committee in two of them, namely Singapore Reinsurance Corporation Limited and Kim Eng Holdings Limited, and has served as a session chairman at the PECC International Conference.

He had also served as advisor to a various other community organizations, including the Charted Institute of Logistics and Transport, Singapore, and Habitat for Humanity Singapore. He was also a member of several awards committees, including the Singapore Youth Award Panel 2006–07, which selected the recipients of the "highest youth accolade in Singapore", and the International Management Action Award awards council.

== Awards, achievements and endowments ==
Tan was awarded the Public Service Medal at Singapore's 2009 National Day Awards in his capacity as chairman of the Medifund Committee of KK Women's & Children's Hospital. Other awards include the SMU Most Inspiring Teacher and the School of Accountancy's Most Outstanding Teacher awards in 2006, and the Service to Education Award by the Ministry of Education for his contribution as chairman of the Meridian Junior College Advisory Committee.

He also sponsored the Professor Tan Teck Meng Gold Medal Award, worth a total of S$2,000, to be given annually to a top graduating Bachelor of Accountancy student, and the Tan Tee Chee & Tsan Kah Ngooh Award, named after his parents, and given annually to 3 outstanding students who have demonstrated excellence in co-curricular activities.

== Research interests and selected publications ==
Professor Tan's research interests included corporate governance, entrepreneurship and financial accounting.

=== Selected journal articles ===
- Wee-Liang Tan and Teck-Meng Tan, "Soziales Unternehmertum in Singapur (English: Social Entrepreneurship in Singapore)", Zeitschrift für Klein- und Mittelunternehmen (a quarterly review published in German, English: Review for Small and Medium-Size Enterprises), September 2002, 3/2002.
- Teck-Meng Tan and Wee-Liang Tan, "Challenges Confronting Asia-Pacific Nations in the 21st Century", Ritsumeikan Journal of Asia Pacific Studies, Japan, April 2001, Vol 7, pp 14–20.
- B C Ghosh, Tan Wee Liang, Tan Teck Meng and Ben Chan, "The Key Success Factors, Distinctive Capabilities, Strategic Thrusts of Top SMEs in Singapore", Journal of Business Research, 3 March 2001, Vol 51, Issue 3, pp 209–22.

=== Selected chapters in books ===
- Tan Teck Meng, Low Aik Meng, John J Williams and Shi Yuwei, "South Africa and African Renaissance: Unprecedented Challenges and Unparalleled Opportunities" in Business Opportunities in the New South Africa, pp 3–15, 1998, Prentice Hall.
- Tan Teck Meng, Choo Teck Min, John J Williams and Chew Soon Beng, "Japan: Epitome of the Phoenix?" in Japan-Asean Relations: Implications for Business, pp 3–14, 1998, Prentice Hall.
- Tan Teck Meng, Low Aik Meng, John J Williams and John F Webster, "The Nature of US-Asean Relations" in US-Asean Relations: Implications for Business, pp 3–15, 1997, Prentice Hall.
