= Lee Hian Kee =

Singaporean analytical chemist

Academic work
- Discipline: Chemistry
- Institutions: National University of Singapore

Lee Hian Kee is a Singaporean analytical chemist best known for his pioneering work on liquid-phase microextraction (LPME), a family of solvent-minimised sample preparation techniques that he named and did much to establish [1]. A fellow of the Singapore National Academy of Science, the Academy of Sciences Malaysia, and the Royal Society of Chemistry, he spent nearly four decades at the National University of Singapore (NUS), where he headed the Department of Chemistry and now holds the title of emeritus professor.

== Career at NUS ==
Lee served as deputy head and then head of the Department of Chemistry, chaired the Faculty of Science promotion and tenure committee, and sat on the university-level promotion and tenure committee as well as the executive committee of the NUS Environmental Research Institute. From 2011 to 2014 he served as Provost's Term Chair Professor. He retired in July 2021 and was made emeritus professor in recognition of his sustained contributions to teaching, research, and service.
