= N-acetyllactosaminide alpha-2,3-sialyltransferase =

Class of enzymes

Identifiers
- EC no.: 2.4.99.6
- CAS no.: 77537-85-0

Databases
- IntEnz: IntEnz view
- BRENDA: BRENDA entry
- ExPASy: NiceZyme view
- KEGG: KEGG entry
- MetaCyc: metabolic pathway
- PRIAM: profile
- PDB structures: RCSB PDB PDBe PDBsum
- Gene Ontology: AmiGO / QuickGO
Search
- PMC: articles
- PubMed: articles
- NCBI: proteins

In enzymology, a N-acetyllactosaminide alpha-2,3-sialyltransferase (EC 2.4.99.6) is an enzyme that catalyzes the chemical reaction

CMP-N-acetylneuraminate + beta-D-galactosyl-1,4-N-acetyl-D-glucosaminyl-glycoprotein $\rightleftharpoons$ CMP + alpha-N-acetylneuraminyl-2,3-beta-D-galactosyl-1,4-N-acetyl-D- glucosaminyl-glycoprotein

Thus, the two substrates of this enzyme are CMP-N-acetylneuraminate and beta-D-galactosyl-1,4-N-acetyl-D-glucosaminyl-glycoprotein, whereas its 3 products are CMP, alpha-N-acetylneuraminyl-2,3-beta-D-galactosyl-1,4-N-acetyl-D-, and glucosaminyl-glycoprotein.

This enzyme belongs to the family of transferases, specifically those glycosyltransferases that do not transfer hexosyl or pentosyl groups. The systematic name of this enzyme class is CMP-N-acetylneuraminate:beta-D-galactosyl-1,4-N-acetyl-D-glucosaminy l-glycoprotein alpha-2,3-N-acetylneuraminyltransferase. Other names in common use include sialyltransferase, cytidine, monophosphoacetylneuraminate-beta-galactosyl(1-, >4)acetylglucosaminide alpha2->3-sialyltransferase, alpha2->3 sialyltransferase, and SiaT. This enzyme participates in 4 metabolic pathways: keratan sulfate biosynthesis, glycosphingolipid biosynthesis - lactoseries, glycan structures - biosynthesis 1, and glycan structures - biosynthesis 2.

== Structural studies ==
As of late 2007, two structures have been solved for this class of enzymes, with PDB accession codes 2EX0 and 2EX1.
