= Sit Kim Ping =

Singaporean biochemist

Sit Kim Ping is a Singaporean biochemist and an Emeritus Professor at the Department of Biochemistry at the National University of Singapore. She was the Head of the Department of Biochemistry (part of the Yong Loo Lin School of Medicine) from 1996 to 2000.

== Early life ==
Sit was born in 1941 and attended Tanjong Katong Girls' School. She studied science at the National University of Singapore and obtained first-class honours when she graduated top of her class. She obtained her PhD in biochemistry from McGill University.

== National University of Singapore ==
Sit was instrumental in the development of the New Life Science Undergraduate Curriculum, and was awarded the Emeritus Professorship in 2008.

== Research ==
Sit studied detoxification, namely the process of conjugation by which metabolic by-products are made soluble prior to excretion. She also studied metabolism within cancer cells and found aerobic respiration within mitochondria in cancer cells, which contradicts the Warburg hypothesis.

== Personal life ==
Sit is married to a clinician and has two children.
