= Hassan Farhangi =

Iranian-Canadian electrical engineer

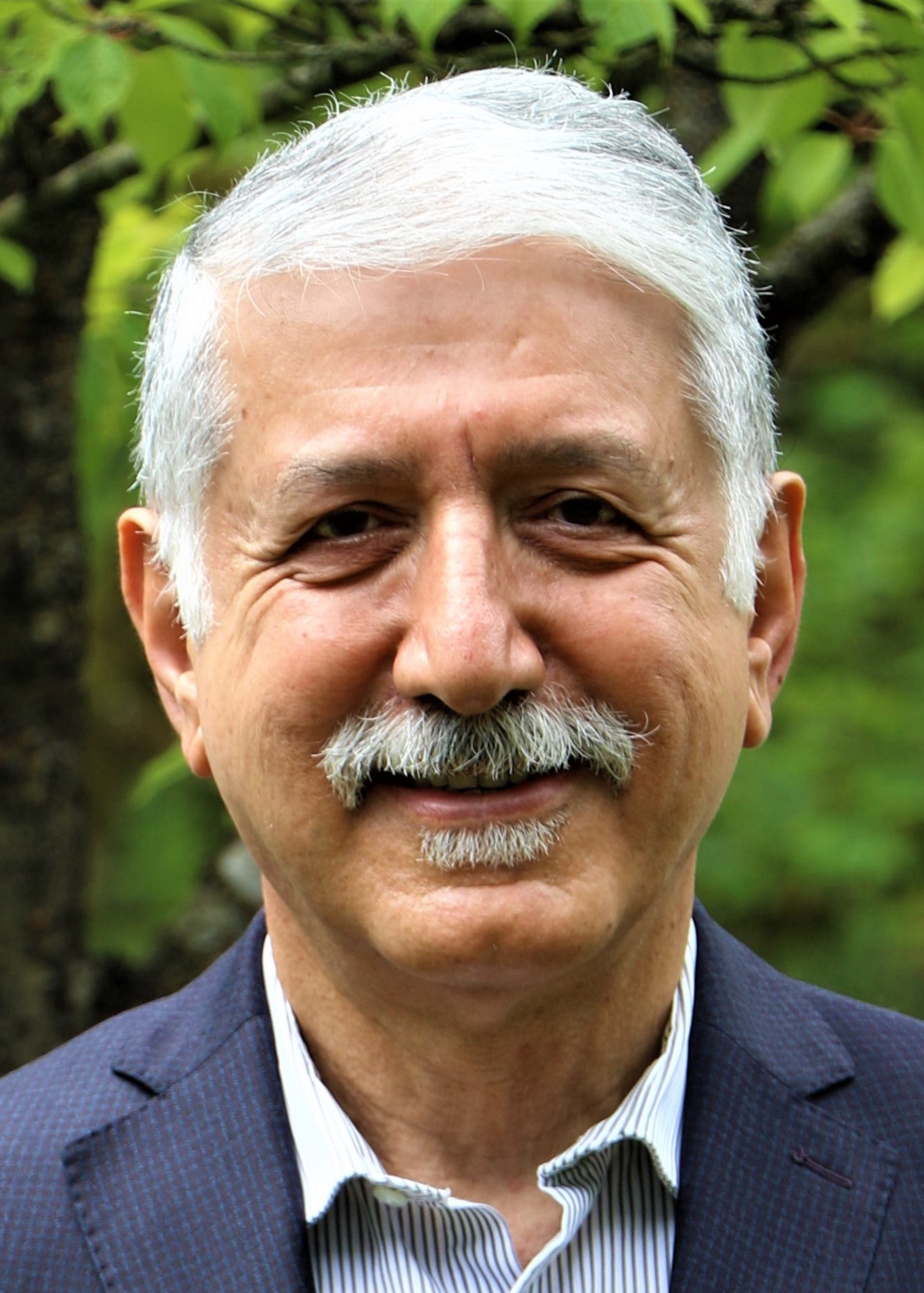
Hassan Farhangi, receiving Top Educator Award, June 2022, Vancouver, BC, Canada

Hassan Farhangi (born in Tehran, Iran) is a Professor Emeritus at the British Columbia Institute of Technology (BCIT) School of Energy and Retired Director of the Smart Microgrid Applied Research Team (SMART) at BCIT in Burnaby, Canada. He is also an adjunct professor at the School of Engineering Science at Simon Fraser University. He is known for his pioneering work in the design and development of Canada's first Smart Microgrid on Burnaby Campus of BCIT from 2007 onwards. He is also known for establishing and leading the NSERC Smart Microgrid Network (NSMG-Net). Under his leadership from 2010 to 2016, this collaborative project brought together Canadian power utility companies and research-intensive Canadian universities to train hundreds of graduate students and publish numerous peer-reviewed research papers pertaining to the long-term efficiency and sustainability of the Canadian power industry. Dr. Farhangi retired from his academic and research appointment at British Columbia Institute of Technology in September 2022 to pursue his personal research interests.

== Education ==
Farhangi obtained his PhD in Electrical & Electronic Engineering from University of Manchester Institute of Science and Technology (UMIST) in the UK in 1982, Master of Science (MSc) in Electrical & Electronic Engineering from University of Bradford (UK) in 1978, and Bachelor of Science (BSc) in Electrical & Electronic Engineering from the University of Tabriz (Iran) in 1977.

== Career ==
Prior to joining BCIT, Dr. Farhangi served as Dean and Professor of Information Technology at the Technical University of British Columbia (now SFU Surrey). He held adjunct faculty appointments at the National University of Singapore, Royal Road University in Victoria, Canada, and at Simon Fraser University and the University of British Columbia in Vancouver, Canada. His professional career included both industry and academic appointments, the first half of which as Chief Technical Officer and managing director of various private sector players in the Electric Utility industry, followed by decades of teaching and academic R&D in universities in North America and Asia. He is well published with numerous contributions in scientific journals and conferences on smart grids and has served on various international standardization committees, such as International Electrotechnical Commission (IEC) Canadian Subcommittee (CSC) Technical Committee 57 (TC 57) Working Group 17 (WG 57) (IEC 61850), Conseil International des Grands Réseaux Électriques (CIGRÉ) WG C6.21 (Smart Metering), CIGRÉ WG C6.22 (Microgrids Evolution), and CIGRÉ WG C6.28 (Hybrid Systems for Off-Grid Power Supply). Dr. Farhangi is a founding member of SmartGrid Canada, an academic member of CIGRÉ, a member of Association of Professional Engineers and Geoscientists of British Columbia, and a senior member of Institute of Electrical and Electronics Engineers (IEEE). He also conceived and championed the development of BCIT's first graduate program in Smart Grids (MEng Smart Grids Systems & Technologies).

== Selected awards ==
- BC Cleantech Top Educator Award 2022
- Electricity Human Resources Canada Innovation Award 2022
- BC Ministry of Energy commendation letter, April 2022
- BCIT's "Excellence in Research" Leadership Award, Nov 2017
- BCIT's "Excellence in Research" Individual Award, Nov 2017
- SmartGrid Canada's "Outstanding Achievement in Advancing Smart Grids in Canada" Award, October 2011
- BCIT's "Excellence in Research" Individual Award, Nov 2010

== Selected patents ==
- Method and apparatus for digital mixing of audio signals in multimedia platforms, 1995
- GPS electronic road pricing system, 1994
- Sequential buffer device, 1986
- Image digitising systems, 1982

== Selected publications ==
- Hassan Farhangi and Geza Joos, "Microgrid Planning and Design; A Concise Guide", 2019, Wiley IEEE Press, ISBN 978-1-119-45350-5
- Guanchen Zhang, Gary Wang, Hassan Farhangi, Ali Palizban; "Data mining of smart meters for load category based disaggregation of residential power consumption"; Elsevier Journal on Sustainable Energy, Grids & Networks; April 2017.
- Hassan Farhangi, Book Chapter on "Cyber-Security Vulnerabilities: An Impediment Against Further Development of Smart Grids”, Smart Grids from a Global Perspective; Bridging Old and New Energy Systems, Editors: Beaulieu, Anne, de Wilde, Jaap, Scherpen, Jacquelien M.A. (Eds.), Springer 2016.
- Hassan Farhangi, “Smart Microgrids: Lessons from Campus Microgrid Design and Implementation”, 2016, CRC Press, ISBN 978-1-4822-4876-0
- M. Manbachi, H. Farhangi, A. Palizban, and S. Arzanpour “A novel Volt-VAR Optimization engine for smart distribution networks utilizing Vehicle to Grid dispatch,” International Journal of Electrical Power and Energy Systems, vol. 74, pp. 238–251, Jan. 2016.
- M. Manbachi, H. Farhangi, A. Palizban, and S. Arzanpour “Maintenance Scheduling of Volt-VAR Control Assets in Smart Distribution Networks Using Advanced Metering Infrastructure,” Canadian Journal of Electrical and Computer Engineering, vol. 39, no.1, pp. 26–33, Jan. 2016.
- M. Manbachi, A. Sadu, H. Farhangi, A. Monti, A. Palizban, F. Ponci, and S. Arzanpour “Impact of EV penetration on Volt–VAR Optimization of distribution networks using real-time co-simulation monitoring platform,” Applied Energy Journal, vol. 169, pp. 28–39, May 2016.
- M. Manbachi, H. Farhangi, A. Palizban, and S. Arzanpour "Community Energy Storage Impacts on Smart Grids Adaptive Volt-VAR Optimization of Distribution Networks," Accepted in 7th International Symposium on Power Electronics for Distributed Generation Systems (PEDG 2016), Jun. 2016, Vancouver, BC, Canada.
- M. Manbachi, H. Farhangi, A. Palizban, and S. Arzanpour “Smart Grids adaptive energy conservation and optimization engine utilizing Particle Swarm Optimization and Fuzzification,”Applied Energy Journal, vol. 174, pp. 69-79, Jul. 2016.
- M. Manbachi, A. Sadu, H. Farhangi, A. Monti, A. Palizban, F. Ponci, and S. Arzanpour “Real Time Co-Simulation Platform for Smart Grids Volt-VAR Optimization using IEC61850,” IEEE Transactions on Industrial Informatics, vol. 12, pp. 1392–1402, Aug. 2016.
- Moein Manbachi, Maryam Nasri, Babak Shahabi, Hassan Farhangi, Ali Palizban, Siamak Arzanpour, Mehrdad Moallem and Daniel C. Lee ,“Real-Time Adaptive VVO/CVR Topology Using Multi Agent System and IEC 61850-Based Communication Protocol”, Publication pending in IEEE Transactions on Sustainable Energy
- M. Manbachi, H. Farhangi, A. Palizban, and S. Arzanpour “Smart Grids Adaptive Volt-VAR Optimization: Challenges for Sustainable Future Grids,” Accepted in Sustainable Cities and Society Journal, Sep. 2016.
- M. Manbachi, H. Farhangi, A. Palizban, S. Arzanpour, “Real-time communication platform for Smart Grids adaptive Volt-VAR Optimization of distribution networks”, International Journal of Electrical Power & Energy Systems, Elsevier, Vol. 74, pp. 238–251, Jan. 2016.
- M. Manbachi, H. Farhangi, A. Palizban, S. Arzanpour, Real-Time Co-Simulated Platform for Energy Conservation of Smart Distribution Network using AMI-based VVO Engine, Accepted in 2015 CIGRE Canada Conference, April 2015.
- M. Manbachi, A. Sadu, H. Farhangi, A. Monti, A. Palizban, F. Ponci, S. Arzanpour, Real-Time Co-Simulated Platform for Novel Volt-VAR Optimization of Smart Distribution Network using AMI Data, Accepted in IEEE International Conference on Smart Energy Grid Engineering, May 2015.
- M. Manbachi, H. Farhangi, A. Palizban, and S. Arzanpour "Real-Time Co-Simulated Platform for Energy Conservation of Smart Distribution Network using AMI-based VVO Engine," in Proc. CIGRÉ Canada Conference, Aug.-Sep. 2015, Winnipeg, MB, Canada.
- M. Manbachi, A. Sadu, H. Farhangi, A. Monti, A. Palizban, F. Ponci, and S. Arzanpour “Real-time communication platform for Smart Grids adaptive Volt-VAR Optimization of distribution networks,” in Proc. IEEE International Conference on Smart Energy Grid Engineering (SEGE), Aug. 2015, Oshawa, ON, Canada.
- M. Manbachi, A. Sadu, H. Farhangi, A. Monti, A. Palizban, F. Ponci, and S. Arzanpour “Real-Time Co-Simulated Platform for Novel Volt-VAR Optimization of Smart Distribution Network using AMI Data,” in Proc. IEEE International Conference on Smart Energy Grid Engineering (SEGE), Aug. 2015, Oshawa, ON, Canada.
- M. Manbachi, H. Farhangi, A. Palizban, S. Arzanpour, Conservation Voltage Reduction Plans of the Future, submitted to The Electricity Journal, May 2015.
- M. Manbachi, H. Farhangi, A. Palizban, S. Arzanpour, Impact of Micro-CHP/PV Penetrations on Smart Grids Adaptive Volt-VAR Optimization of Distribution Networks using AMI data, submitting to IEEE Transactions on Power Delivery, June 2015.
- M. Manbachi, A. Sadu, H. Farhangi, A. Monti, A. Palizban, F. Ponci, S. Arzanpour, Real-Time Co-Simulation Monitoring and Control Platform for AMI-based Volt-VAR Optimization of Smart Distribution Networks, submitting to IEEE Transactions on Power Delivery, June 2015.
- M. Manbachi, H. Farhangi, A. Palizban, and S. Arzanpour “Quasi real-time ZIP load modeling for Conservation Voltage Reduction of smart distribution networks using disaggregated AMI data,” Sustainable Cities and Society Journal, vol. 19, pp. 1–10, Dec. 2015.
- M. Manbachi, M Nasri, B Shahabi, H Farhangi, A Palizban, S Arzanpour, Mehrdad Moallem, Daniel C Lee, “Real-Time Adaptive VVO/CVR Topology Using MultiAgent System and IEC 61850-Based Communication Protocol”, IEEE Transaction on Sustainable Energy, Vol. 5, No. 2, Apr. 2014, pp. 587–598.
- Hassan Farhangi, “A Roadmap to Integration”, IEEE Power & Energy, Vol 12, No 3, Jun 2014.
- Moein Manbachi, Hassan Farhangi, Ali Palizban, Siamak Arzanpour "A Novel Volt-VAR Optimization Engine for Smart Distribution Networks utilizing Vehicle to Grid Dispatch", Submitted to IJEPES Journal, May 2014
- M. Manbachi, H. Farhangi, A. Palizban, S. Arzanpour, Predictive Algorithm for Volt/VAR Optimization of Distribution Networks Using Neural Networks, in Proc. IEEE Canadian Conference on Electrical and Computer Engineering (CCECE2014), May 2014, Toronto, Canada.
- M. Manbachi, H. Farhangi, A. Palizban, S. Arzanpour, A Novel Predictive Volt-VAR Optimization Engine for Smart Distribution Systems, in Proc. 2014 CIGRÉ Canada Conference, Toronto, Sept. 2014.
- Minoo Shariat-Zadeh, Ali Palizban, Hassan Farhangi, Calin Surdu, "Analysis and Validation of Interconnection Requirements of a Large Renewable Energy Installation with the Utility Grid", 2014 CIGRÉ Canada Conference, Toronto, Sept 2014.
- Minoo Shariat-Zadeh, Ali Palizban, Hassan Farhangi, Calin Surdu, "Analysis and Validation of Interconnection Requirements of a Large Renewable Energy Installation with the Utility Grid", in Proc. 2014 CIGRÉ Canada Conference, Toronto, Sept. 2014.
- M. Manbachi, H. Farhangi, A. Palizban, S. Arzanpour, Impact of V2G on Real-time Adaptive Volt/VAr Optimization of Distribution Networks, in Proc. IEEE Electrical Power and Energy Conference (EPEC 2013), Aug. 2013, Halifax, Canada.
- Hassan Farhangi, Book Chapter on "Smart Grids and ICT's Role in its evolution", Green Communications: Theoretical Fundamentals, Algorithms and Applications, Published: Sept 20, 2012 by CRC Press, edited by Jinsong Wu; Sundeep Rangan; Honggang Zhang
- Giuseppe Stanciulescu, Hassan Farhangi, Ali Palizban and Nikola Stanchev, “Communication Technologies for Smart Microgrid”, in Proceeding of IEEE PES Conference, Washington DC, Jan 2012
- M. Manbachi, B. Shahabi, H. Farhangi, A. Palizban, S. Arzanpour, D. C. Lee, A Real-time Adaptive Volt/VAr Optimization Engine using Intelligent Agents and Narrow-Band Power Line Communication, accepted poster at Utility Telecom Conference, Sept. 2012, Vancouver, Canada.
- M. Manbachi, H. Farhangi, A. Palizban and S. Arzanpour, Real-Time Adaptive Optimization Engine Algorithm for Integrated Volt/VAr Optimization and Conservation Voltage Reduction of Smart Microgrids, in Proc. CIGRÉ Canada Conference, Montreal, Sept. 2012.
- Maryam Nasri, Hassan Farhangi, Ali Palizban and Mehrdad Moallem, "Multi-Agent Control System for Real-time Adaptive VVO/CVR in Smart Substation" in Proc. of IEEE Electrical Power And Energy Conference, London, Ontario, Oct. 2012.
- Moein Manbachi, Hassan Farhangi, Ali Palizban, Siamak Arzanpour, Impact of V2G on Real-time Adaptive Volt/VAr Optimization of Distribution Networks, IEEE PES General Meeting, Dec. 2012.
- Ali Palizban and Hassan Farhangi, ” Low Voltage Distribution Substation Integration in Smart Microgrid”, in Proceeding of IEEE 8th Conference on Power Electronics, Jeju Island, South Korea, June 2011
- Hassan Farhangi, “Campus Based Smart Microgrid”, in Proceeding of Cigre International Conference in Smart Grids, Bologna, Sept 2011
- Hassan Farhangi, “The Path of Smart Grids”, IEEE Power & Energy Magazine, Vol 8, No 1, pp. 18–28, Jan 2010.
- Hassan Farhangi, “Intelligent Microgrid Research at BCIT”, in Proceeding of IEEE EPEC’08 Conference, Vancouver, Oct 2008.
- Tracey Leacock, Hassan Farhangi, Alice Mansell, and Karen Belfer, “Infinite, Possibilities, Finite Resources: The TechBC Course Development Process” (IASTED International Conference, Computers and Advanced Technology in Education, Banff, Canada, 2001).
- Hassan Farhangi; J. W. M. E. Konings; "A CD-ROM Data Retriever IC"; IEEE Transactions on Consumer Electronics, Volume: CE-32, Issue: 4, November 1986.
- Farhangi, H.; Daskalakis, C.; Heaton, A.G. (1982). "A microprocessor-based still frame capturing system". Displays. 3 (4): 212–218. doi:10.1016/0141-9382(82)90005-1.
