= Grace Ciao =

Fashion illustrator from Singapore

- Education: National University of Singapore
- Occupation: Fashion Illustrator
- Known for: Illustrations using real flower petals and water color
- Website: www.graceciao.com

Grace Ciao is a fashion illustrator from Singapore.

== Early life ==
Ciao was born in Singapore.

== Education ==
Ciao graduated with a degree in business from National University of Singapore.

== Career ==
Ciao is known for her illustrations using real flower petals and watercolor painting.

Ciao grew up developing an interest in fashion, trying to recreate the designs she saw on TV and in magazines. She began using petals for illustration after wanting to preserve a red rose that was given to her. Her designs are mainly dresses, using natural form of each flower on her illustrations, so each piece has an element of realism as well as fantasy. She has created illustrations for companies such as Chanel, Christian Dior, and Fendi.
