= Zuowei Shen =

Chinese mathematician

Zuowei Shen (Chinese: 沈佐伟) is a Chinese mathematician, and Tan Chin Tuan Centennial Professor at the National University of Singapore (NUS). Shen received his BSc in 1982 from Hohai University (China), MSc in 1987 and PhD in 1991 from University of Alberta. He first joined NUS as a lecturer at the Department of Mathematics in 1993; was promoted to professor in 2002 and distinguished professor in 2009. Shen was Head of Department of Mathematics from 2012 to 2014 and was appointed Dean of Science in 2014.

Shen is known for his work on approximation theory, wavelet theory, and image processing. He was an invited speaker at the International Congress of Mathematicians (ICM) in 2010 (Section: Numerical Analysis and Scientific Computing), and an invited speaker at the 8th International Congress on Industrial and Applied Mathematics (ICIAM) in 2015.

== Selected works ==
- Ron, Amos; Shen, Zuowei, "Frames and stable bases for shift-invariant subspaces of L2(Rd)". Canad. J. Math. 47 (1995), no. 5, 1051–1094.
- Ron, Amos; Shen, Zuowei, "Affine systems in L2(Rd):the analysis of the analysis operator". J. Funct. Anal. 148 (1997), no. 2, 408–447.
- Ron, Amos; Shen, Zuowei, "Weyl-Heisenberg frames and Riesz bases in L2(Rd)". Duke Math. J. 89 (1997), no. 2, 237–282.
- Daubechies, Ingrid; Han, Bin; Ron, Amos; Shen, Zuowei, "Framelets: MRA-based constructions of wavelet frames". Appl. Comput. Harmon. Anal. 14 (2003), no. 1, 1–46.
- Cai, Jian-Feng; Osher, Stanley; Shen, Zuowei, "Split Bregman methods and frame based image restoration". Multiscale Model. Simul. 8 (2009/10), no. 2, 337–369.
- Cai, Jian-Feng; Candès, Emmanuel J.; Shen, Zuowei, "A singular value thresholding algorithm for matrix completion". SIAM J. Optim. 20 (2010), no. 4, 1956–1982.
- Cai, Jian-Feng; Dong, Bin; Osher, Stanley; Shen, Zuowei, "Image restoration: total variation, wavelet frames, and beyond". J. Amer. Math. Soc. 25 (2012), no. 4, 1033–1089.

== Awards and honours ==
Shen is a fellow of the Singapore National Academy of Science, Society for Industrial and Applied Mathematics, the American Mathematical Society and The World Academy of Sciences (TWAS).
