= Kay Tan =

Researcher in Singapore

Kay Tan from the National University of Singapore, Singapore was named Fellow of the Institute of Electrical and Electronics Engineers (IEEE) in 2014 for contributions to evolutionary multiobjective optimization.
