= Mak Joon Wah =

Malaysian physician

Dr. Mak Joon Wah
- Born: December 11, 1942; Penang, Malaysia
- Died: January 26, 2024 (aged 81)
- Education: National University of Singapore; University of Malaya
- Occupations: Physician, Vice-President of the International Medical University
- Known for: Global expert in filariasis and malaria

Dr. Mak Joon Wah (11 December 1942 – 26 January 2024) was a Malaysian physician. He was an expert on tropical and parasitic diseases and has published over 350 scientific papers. He is Professor of Pathology (the equivalent of a named chair in North America) and Vice-President of the International Medical University (IMU). He had been formerly been Director of the Institute for Medical Research (IMR) and has worked as a consultant to the World Health Organization. He was Director of the WHO Collaborating Centre for Lymphatic Filariasis. He was a Professor of Pathology at the Universiti Putra Malaysia for three years before joining IMU.

He was elected President of Malaysian Society of Parasitology and Tropical Medicine in 1982 was the founding Editor of its Journal, Tropical Biomedicine, from 1985 to 1987.

He held an MB BS from the University of Singapore (1967), a Master of Public Health (MPH) from the University of Malaya (1976), and Doctor of Medicine (MD) degree from the University of Singapore (1980). He became a Fellow of the Royal College of Pathologists in 1995.

== Awards ==
- National Science Award, 1985
- Merdeka Award, 2011

== See also ==
- filariasis
