= Hegen =

Baby-product brand in Singapore

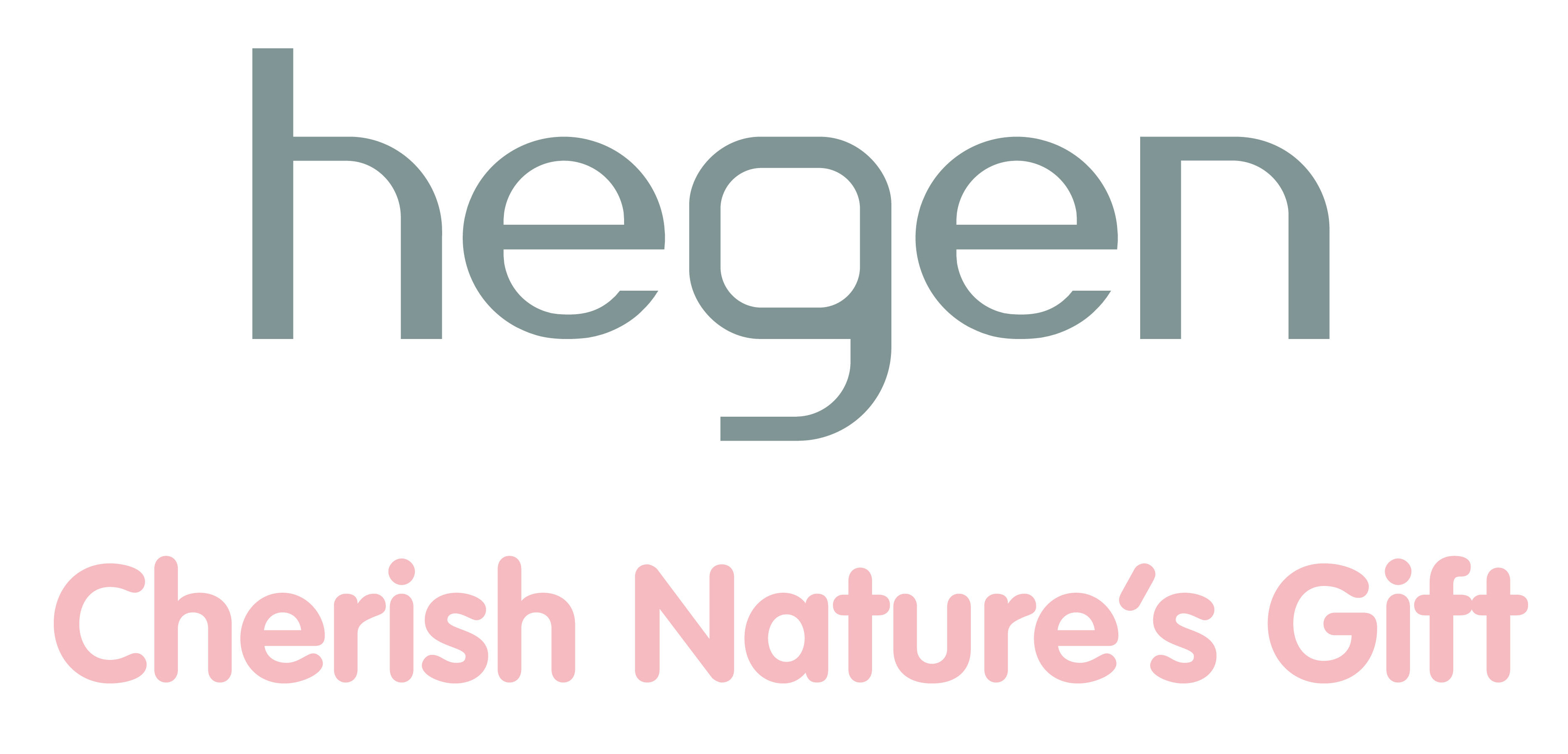
- Type: Private Limited
- Industry: Baby and Nursing Products
- Founded: June 2014
- Headquarters: 438A Alexandra Road, #02-01 Alexandra Technopark, Singapore 119967
- Key people: Yvon Bock (CEO)
- Website: www.hegen.com

Hegen is a Singapore brand incorporated in June 2014 that designs and produces breastfeeding pumps, storage containers, and bottles. Its flagship product is its Express-Store-Feed system with the patented Press-to-Close, Twist-to-Open (PCTO) technology. Its current CEO is its founder, Yvon Bock. Hegen was reported to be one of the top 10 fastest growing companies in Singapore and ranked #41 in the Financial Times "High-Growth Companies Asia-Pacific 2022".

== Origin ==
Hegen was founded in 2015 by CEO Yvon Bock to provide sustainable, innovative and high-quality products for breastfeeding mothers, particularly products that would simplify the task of expressing, storing and feeding breast milk to a baby. More specifically, its mission was to offer a solution, then not existent in the market, for the problems faced by breastfeeding mothers in managing and storing their expressed breastmilk. As a mother of four, Bock sought to create technology and products that would simplify the task of expressing, storing and feeding breastmilk to a baby by minimizing both the amount of accessories required, and the need to transfer milk between receptacles. The official registration of the company and brand was preceded by 5 years of research and product design, self-funded by Bock.

The name "Hegen" originates from the German expression "hegen und pflegen", which means both "to care deeply" and also "to nurture".

== Sales and marketing ==
Hegen products were first launched in Singapore, but have since expanded internationally through online marketing and e-commerce into 16 other markets. The brand's growth is now primarily driven by online sales following the onset of the COVID-19 pandemic, which caused the disruption of many of the brand's physical retail channels. It opens its first concept space in Motherswork Great World in 2022.

== Products ==
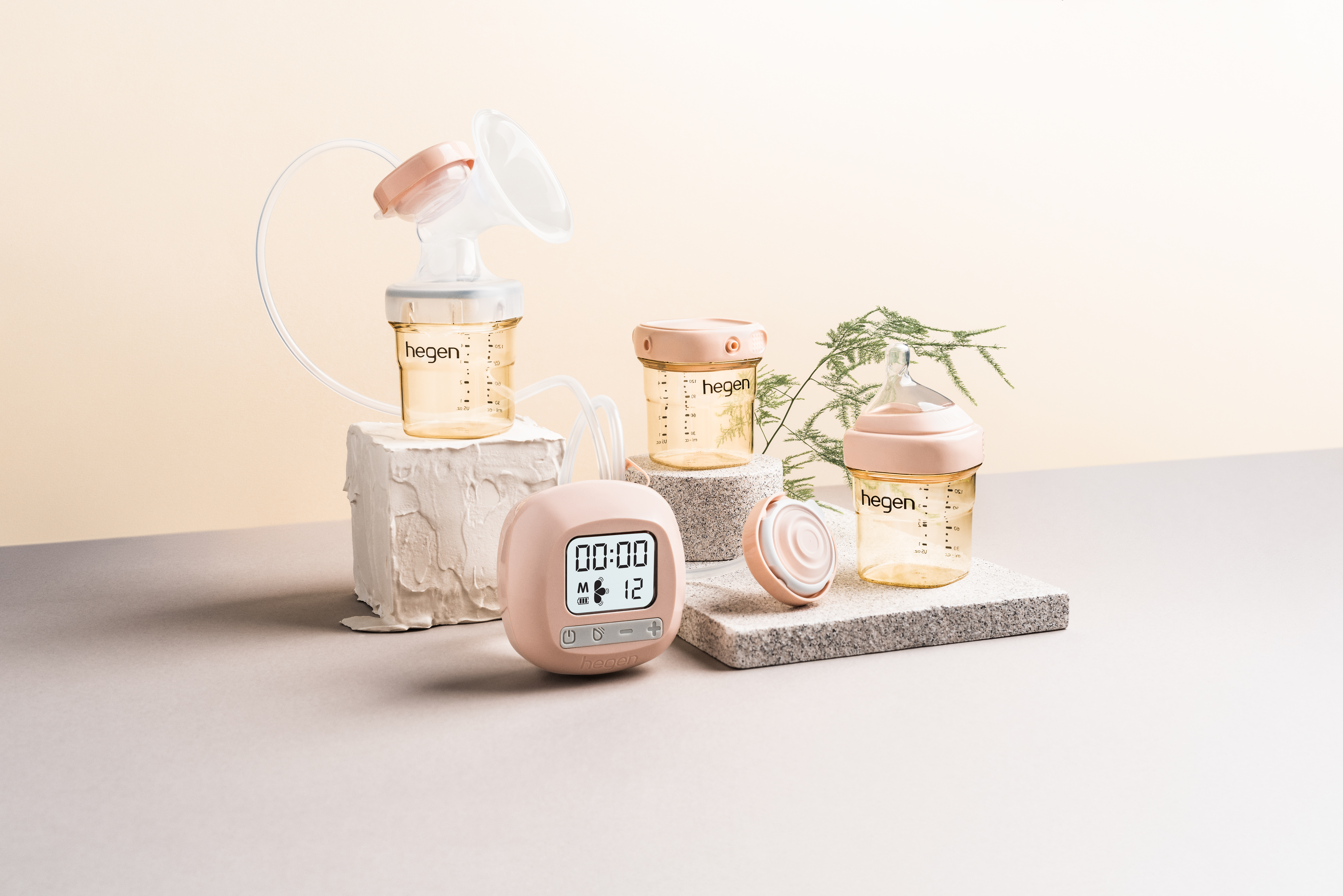
Hegen PCTO Express-Store-Feed System

Hegen produces pumping, storage and feeding products for breastfeeding mothers and babies, primarily the PCTO Express-Store-Feed system, as well as the PCTO electric breast pump.

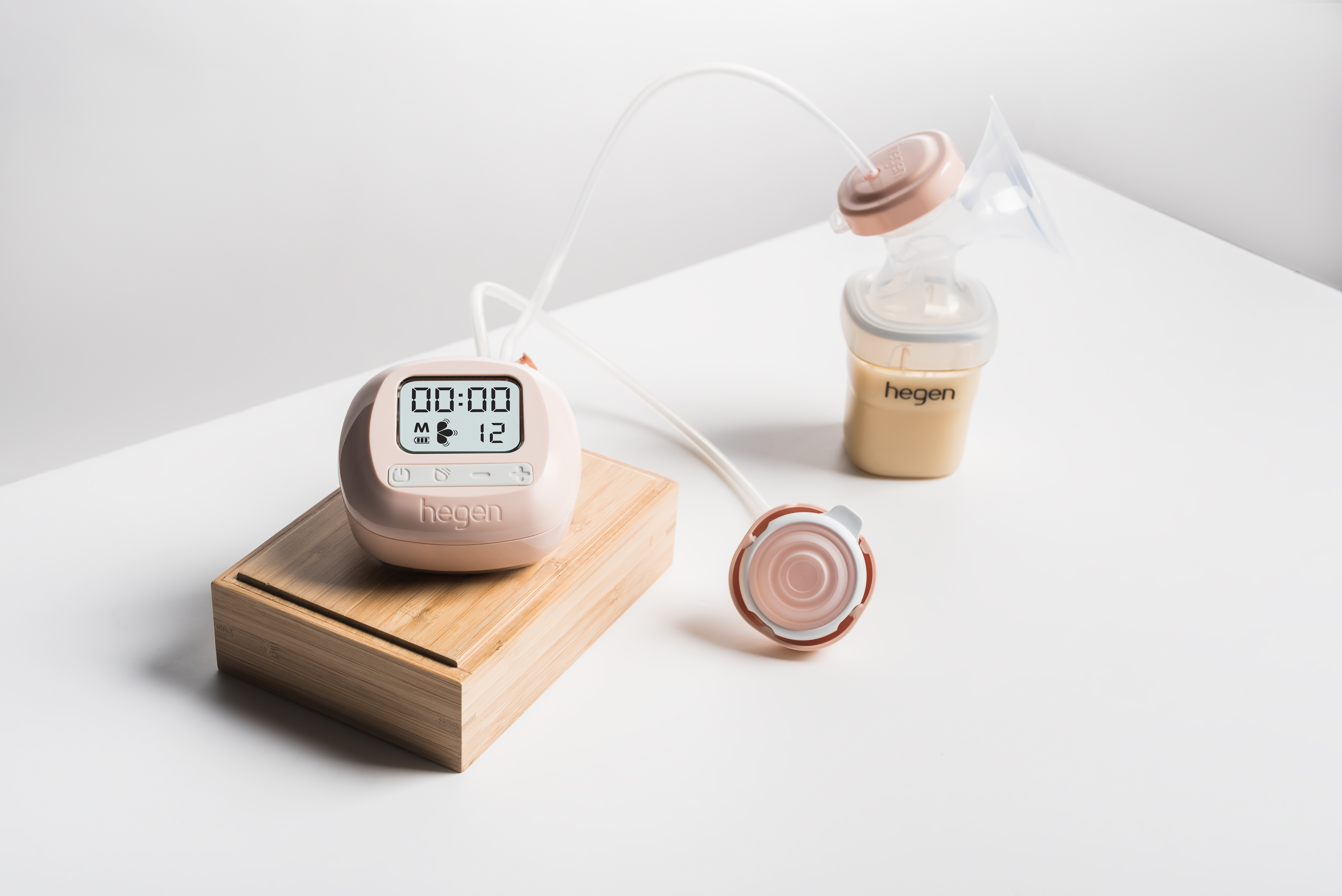
Hegen PCTO Double Breast Pump

== Awards, accolades and recognition ==
Hegen's Express-Store-Feed system won the Good Design Award in 2018, while the PCTO Double Electric Breast Pump won the same award in 2019. Its All-Rounder Cup also won the Red Dot design award in 2023.

On Singles' Day 2017, Hegen became the first Singaporean brand to appear live on Feng Kuang Boss, China's e-commerce giant Alibaba's 24-hour livestreaming variety show cum brand showcase.

As a brand, Hegen has also won a silver Stevie Award in 2020. In 2023, they clinched 11th place at the Enterprise 50 awards.

Hegen has been mentioned as an example of successful Singapore business by several Singapore government figures, including Prime Minister Lee Hsien Loong in his 2021 National Day Rally and Minister for Trade and Industry, S Iswaran.

== Corporate social responsibility ==
Since 2018, Hegen has sponsored breastfeeding kits and conducted baby massage and breastfeeding workshops at Safe Place, a Singapore not-for-profit organisation supporting women and families with unsupported pregnancies.

In April 2020, Hegen gifted 1,000 sets of its Express-Store-Feed starter kit to pregnant hospital healthcare workers in Singapore.
