= SFU School of Interactive Arts and Technology =

Unit of Simon Fraser University in Canada

School of Interactive Arts and Technology
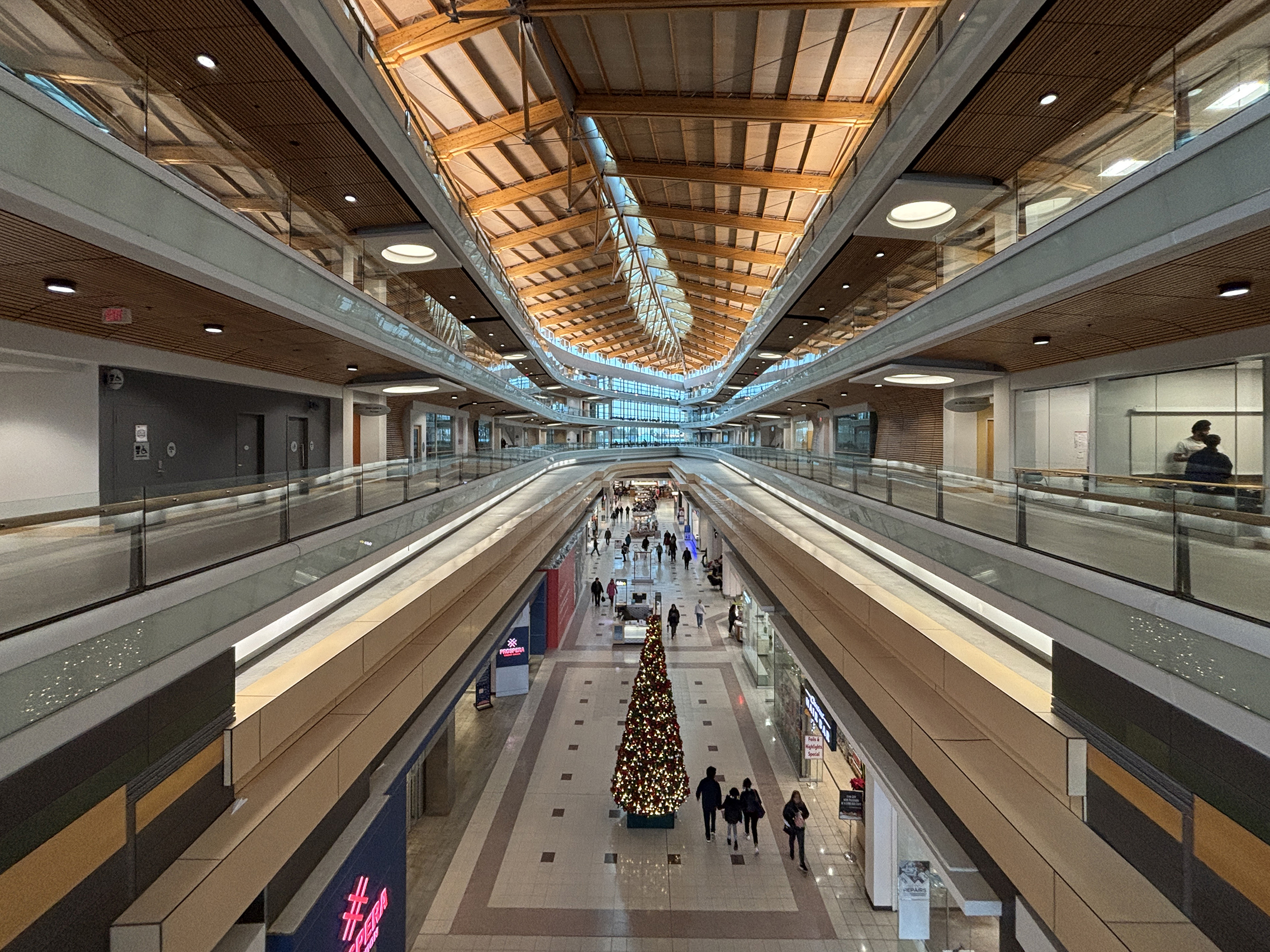
- Type: Public
- Established: 2002; 24 years ago
- Parent institution: Simon Fraser University
- Dean: Carman Neustaedter
- Director: Thecla Schiphorst
- Associate Director: Susan Clements-Vivian
- Location: Surrey, British Columbia, Canada; 49.187598°N 122.849679°W
- Campus: Surrey campus, urban
- Language: Canadian English
- Faculty: Communication, Art and Technology
- Website: siat.sfu.ca
- SFU Surrey Campus

SFU's School of Interactive Arts and Technology (SIAT) is an interdisciplinary research and teaching department at Simon Fraser University (SFU), operating out of the university's Surrey campus in British Columbia, Canada.

Established in 2002, SIAT is part of the Faculty of Communication, Art and Technology (FCAT). The school integrates computing science, human–computer interaction (HCI), design, media arts, and cultural theory into its academic curriculum and research initiatives.

== History and Foundation ==
SIAT's origins are directly tied to the closure of the Technical University of British Columbia (TechBC), a short-lived, special-purpose technical institution established by the provincial government in 1999. Based in Surrey Place Mall (later redeveloped as Central City), TechBC pioneered an experimental curriculum that blended interactive art, information technology, and business.

Following a provincial election and a re-evaluation of post-secondary spending, the British Columbia government announced the closure of TechBC on February 7, 2002. To preserve the academic tracks and accommodate displaced students, the province transferred TechBC's infrastructure, faculty, and programs to Simon Fraser University. This transition formed the foundational core of SFU's new Surrey campus, with TechBC's interactive arts and technology modules officially reorganized to establish SIAT.

In 2009, SFU grouped SIAT into the newly created Faculty of Communication, Art and Technology alongside the School of Communication, the School for the Contemporary Arts, and the Publishing Program.

== Academics ==
SIAT grants undergraduate and graduate degrees that bridge technical and creative disciplines.

=== Undergraduate ===
Undergraduate students can pursue either a Bachelor of Arts (BA) or a Bachelor of Science (BSc) degree, depending on whether their elective coursework leans toward the humanities or computational systems.

Following a major curriculum restructuring, SIAT replaced its older legacy divisions (Design, Media Arts, and Interactive Systems) with modern specialized concentrations. Approved majors can opt to complete one, multiple, or no specific concentrations. The active undergraduate concentrations include:

- AI and Data Science for Human-Centred Systems: Focuses on extracting data insights, building AI systems for interactive tech, data-driven decision-making, and computer-assisted creativity while adhering to ethical, human-centred computing principles.
- Creative Media: Concentrates on narrative, digital media, moving images, sound design, and advanced computational video production.
- Design and Development for Web & Mobile: Emphasizes modern development practices, application building, programming, and web accessibility frameworks tailored to user contexts.
- Designing Interactions: Develops competencies in interaction design methods, user experience (UX) design, and speculative design through project-based prototyping and community-focused interventions.
- Extended Reality & Game Design: Covers the foundations of game mechanics, animation, advanced game design, and building immersive virtual environments.
- Critical Making: Focuses on digital fabrication and physical computing. Students work with physical and computational materials in the context of cultural themes like sustainability, health, and social justice.
- Evidence-Based Interactive Systems: Focuses on interface design, advanced human-computer interaction (HCI), design evaluation, and utilizing research-backed frameworks to build responsive, collaborative environments.

=== Graduate Studies ===
At the graduate level, SIAT offers research-intensive programs leading to Master of Arts (MA), Master of Science (MSc), and Doctor of Philosophy (PhD) degrees. These programs train students in interdisciplinary research methodologies, combining computational development with empirical human-centred study.

== Research ==
SIAT operates as a research-intensive department focused on how humans experience and interact with computational systems. Faculty and graduate researchers collaborate across distinct labs on the Surrey campus, specializing in areas such as visual analytics, wearable technology, virtual reality (VR), healthcare technologies, and serious gaming (such as biofeedback systems designed for child emotion regulation).

== Notable projects and initiatives ==
=== Virtual Ambassadors ===
In early 2025, the school debuted its Virtual Ambassador Program, an institutional outreach initiative that utilizes VTuber (virtual YouTuber) technology for student engagement and public relations. Recognized as the first official university-sanctioned VTuber program, the project serves as a public-facing application of the school's focus on interactive media, real-time motion capture, and virtual avatar design. The project received coverage for its novel integration of digital subculture into mainstream university administration and student recruitment strategies.

== See also ==
- Simon Fraser University
- Faculty of Communication, Art and Technology at Simon Fraser University
- Technical University of British Columbia
