= Aloysius Cheang =

Singaporean security director

- Occupation: Managing Director
- Employer: Cloud Security Alliance

Aloysius Cheang is the Managing Director APAC for the Cloud Security Alliance. He has another role as their Standards Secretariat overseeing all standardization efforts within CSA (Cloud Security Alliance) and owning the relationships with other SDOs. Aloysius was a former member of the Singapore government's Chief Security Officer roundtable, and founder of SIG^2 in 2001. He also held senior executive positions with various consulting companies and telco with a worldwide remit.

SIG^2 rose to become the de facto security community in Asia, and lead to the formalisation of the Singapore government-backed Association of Information Security Professionals (AISP), where Cheang was pro tem chairman from 2006 to 2007. He was also co-editor for the ISO/IEC 27032 "Guidelines for Cybersecurity", and represented Singapore on ISO/IEC/JTC 1 SC 27 WG4. His previous contribution for SS 507 "Business Continuity/Disaster Recovery Industry Standard" was adopted as ISO/IEC 24762. Cheang sits on the Singapore IT Standards Committee and the National Infocomm Competency Framework Security Sub-Committee.

Cheang's professional certifications include CISA, CISSP and GCIH, and is the first Microsoft Security MVP in South Asia, and a member of the Microsoft SEA MVP Hall of Fame. His views have been presented in Times Asia, CIO Asia, ZDNet, Computerworld, The New Paper, MyPaper, Sin Chew Daily, Wen Wei Po, The Straits Times and ChannelNewsAsia as an independent source of specialist opinion.

== Publications ==
- A framework for managing information systems security
- Analysis of the Linux.Ramen Worm
- Singapore Standard 493 Specification For IT Security Standards Framework
- Singapore Standard 507 Singapore standard for information and communications technology disaster recovery services, which has been adopted as ISO/IEC24762 Guidelines for Information and Communications Technology (ICT) Disaster Recovery Services
- Security MVP Article of the Month – August 2007 and Security Technet Article of the Month, Role of Security in Infrastructure Optimization, August 15, 2007
- Security MVP Article of the Month – May 2008 and Security Technet Article of the Month, Privacy Issues – Business Disabler or Enabler?, May 14, 2008
