= University of Malaya =

Public university in Kuala Lumpur, Malaysia

Universiti Malaya
- Universiti Malaya (Malay)
- Other name: UM
- Former names: King Edward VII College of Medicine; Raffles College; University of Malaya in Singapore
- Motto: Ilmu Puncha Kemajuan (Malay)
- Motto in English: Knowledge is the Source of Progress
- Type: Public research university
- Established: 28 September 1905; 121 years ago
- Affiliations: ACU, APRU, ASAIHL, AUN, FUIW, APUCEN, UAiTED
- Endowment: MYR220 million (2024) (US$56 million)
- Chancellor: Nazrin Shah of Perak
- Vice-Chancellor: Dato' Seri Dr. Noor Azuan Abu Osman
- Pro-Chancellors: Toh Puan Dato' Seri Dr. Hajah Aishah Ong; Tan Sri Datuk Zainun Ali Tan Sri Dato' Seri Mohd Annuar Zaini
- Students: 36,444 (September 2024)
- Undergraduates: 19,134 (September 2024)
- Postgraduates: 17,310 (September 2024)
- Location: Universiti Malaya, 50603, Kuala Lumpur, Malaysia; 3°07′15″N 101°39′23″E
- Colours: Red, gold and blue
- Website: www.um.edu.my

The Universiti Malaya (abbreviated UM) is a public research university located in Kuala Lumpur, Malaysia. It is the oldest Malaysian institution of higher education, and was the only university in newly independent Malaya.

The predecessor of the university, King Edward VII College of Medicine, was established on 28 September 1905 in Singapore, then a territory of the British Empire. In October 1949, the merger of the King Edward VII College of Medicine and Raffles College created the university. Rapid growth during its first decade caused the university to organise as two autonomous divisions on 15 January 1959, one located in Singapore and the other in Kuala Lumpur. In 1960, the governments of Malaya and Singapore indicated that these two divisions should become autonomous and separate national universities. One branch was located in Singapore, becoming the University of Singapore (merging into the National University of Singapore in 1980) after the independence of Singapore from Malaysia, and the other branch was located in Kuala Lumpur, retaining the name Universiti Malaya. Legislation was passed in 1961 and the Universiti Malaya was established on 1 January 1962. In 2012, UM was granted autonomy by the Ministry of Higher Education. The university also collaborated with the University of Wales in 2013 to establish the International University of Malaya-Wales (IUMW), a private university in Malaysia, which is now known as the University of Malaya-Wales (UM-Wales).

Today, UM has more than 2,300 faculty members and is divided into fourteen faculties, two academies, three institutes and two academic centres.

== History ==
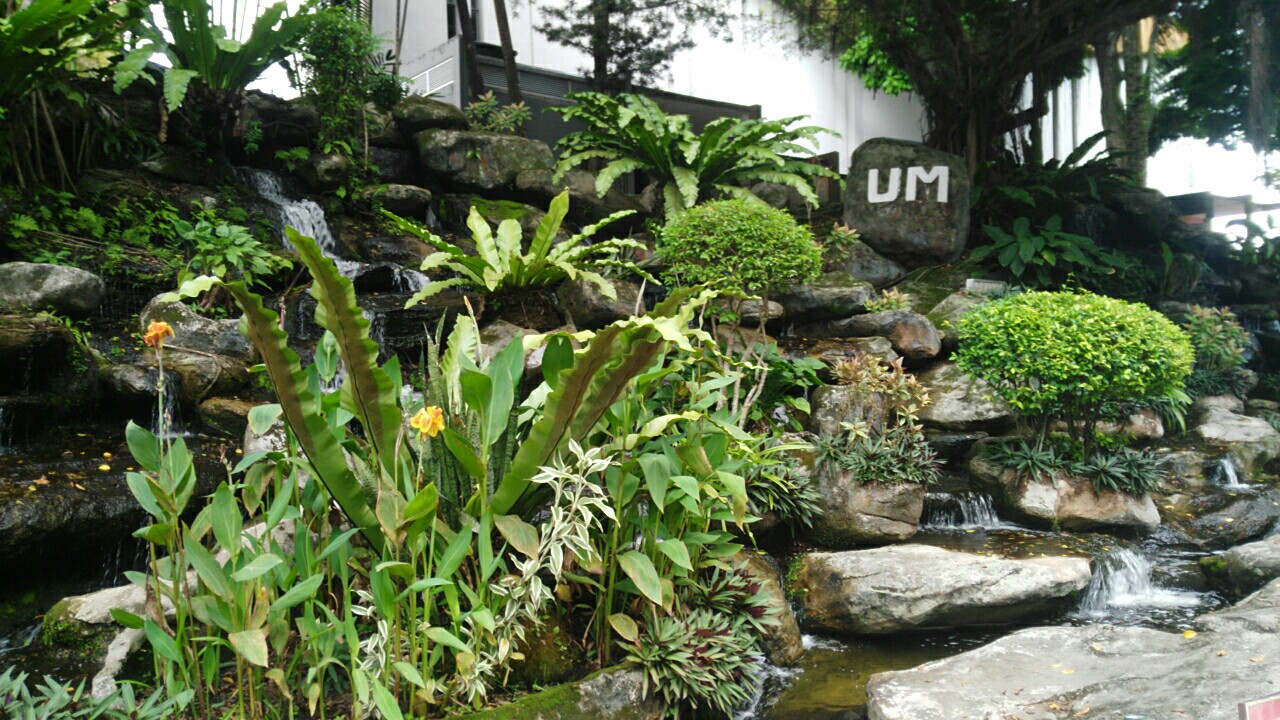
The Universiti Malaya is commonly referred to as "UM"

=== King Edward VII College of Medicine ===
The establishment of the university began with the issue of a shortage of medical assistants in Singapore and Penang during the late 1890s. The problem was addressed in a report published by the Education Commission in April 1902. The report stated that the commission was in favour of establishing a medical school to fulfil the demand for medical assistants in government hospitals. However, such a view was not in favour among the European community.

Legislation was passed by the Straits Legislative Council in June 1905 under Ordinance No. XV 1905. The school opened on 3 July 1905 and began functioning in September. On 28 September 1905, Sir John Anderson officiated the school under the name 'The Straits and Federated Malay States Government Medical School.'

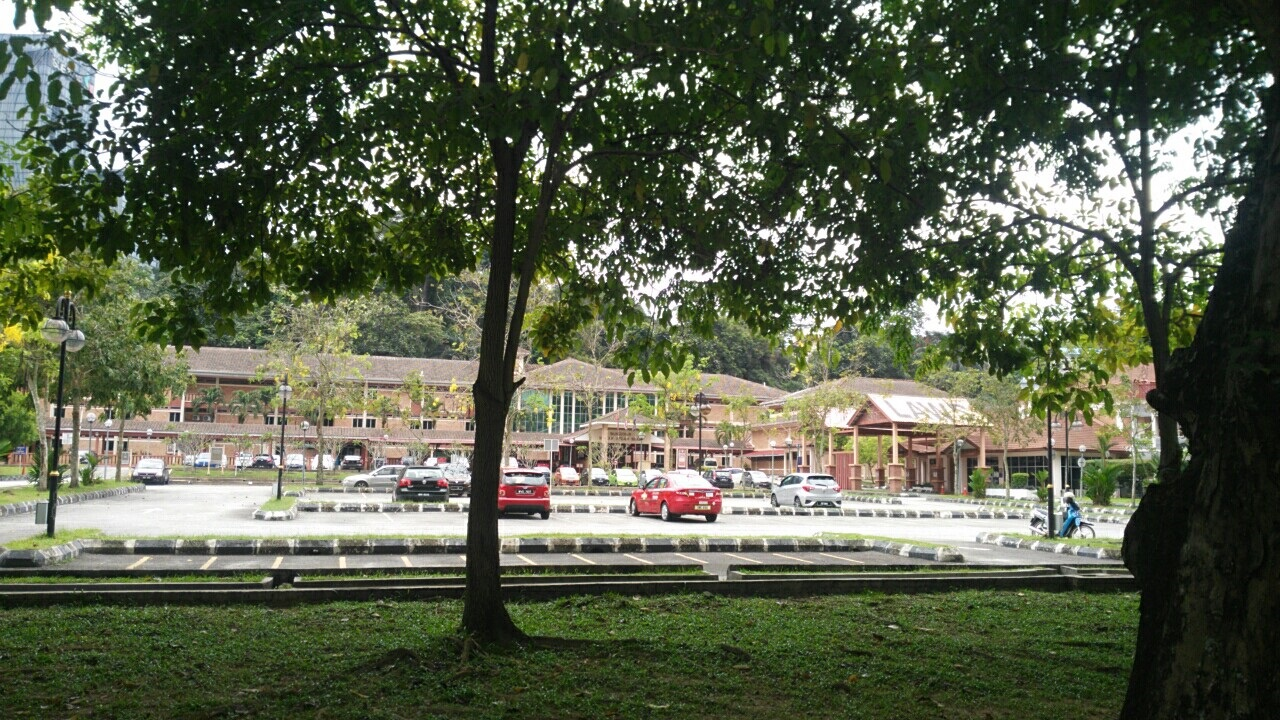
Faculty of Laws Building

The school was located in the old Female Lunatic Asylum near the Singapore General Hospital at Sepoy Lines off New Bridge Road, where four of the asylum buildings were converted into a medical school. In 1907, a lecture hall and laboratory were added. There was no library and room to keep pathological specimens.

In 1905, there were 17 medical students, four students attending the hospital assistant course. Five years later, the enrolments increased to 90 medical students and 30 trainee hospital assistants. The school had only one permanent staff, which was the Principal; the teaching staff were employed on a part-time basis. The Principal was Dr Gerald Dudley Freer, who previously served as Senior Colonial Surgeon Resident of Penang.

The School Council wanted to gain recognition of its Diploma by the General Council of Medical Education in the United Kingdom to ensure that the Licentiate of Medicine and Surgery Diploma offered by the school would gain worldwide recognition. In 1916, the GCME recognised the Licentiate of Medicine and Surgery Diploma offered by the school. The licentiates were placed on the General Council's Colonial List of the British Medical Register and were entitled to practise anywhere within the British Empire.

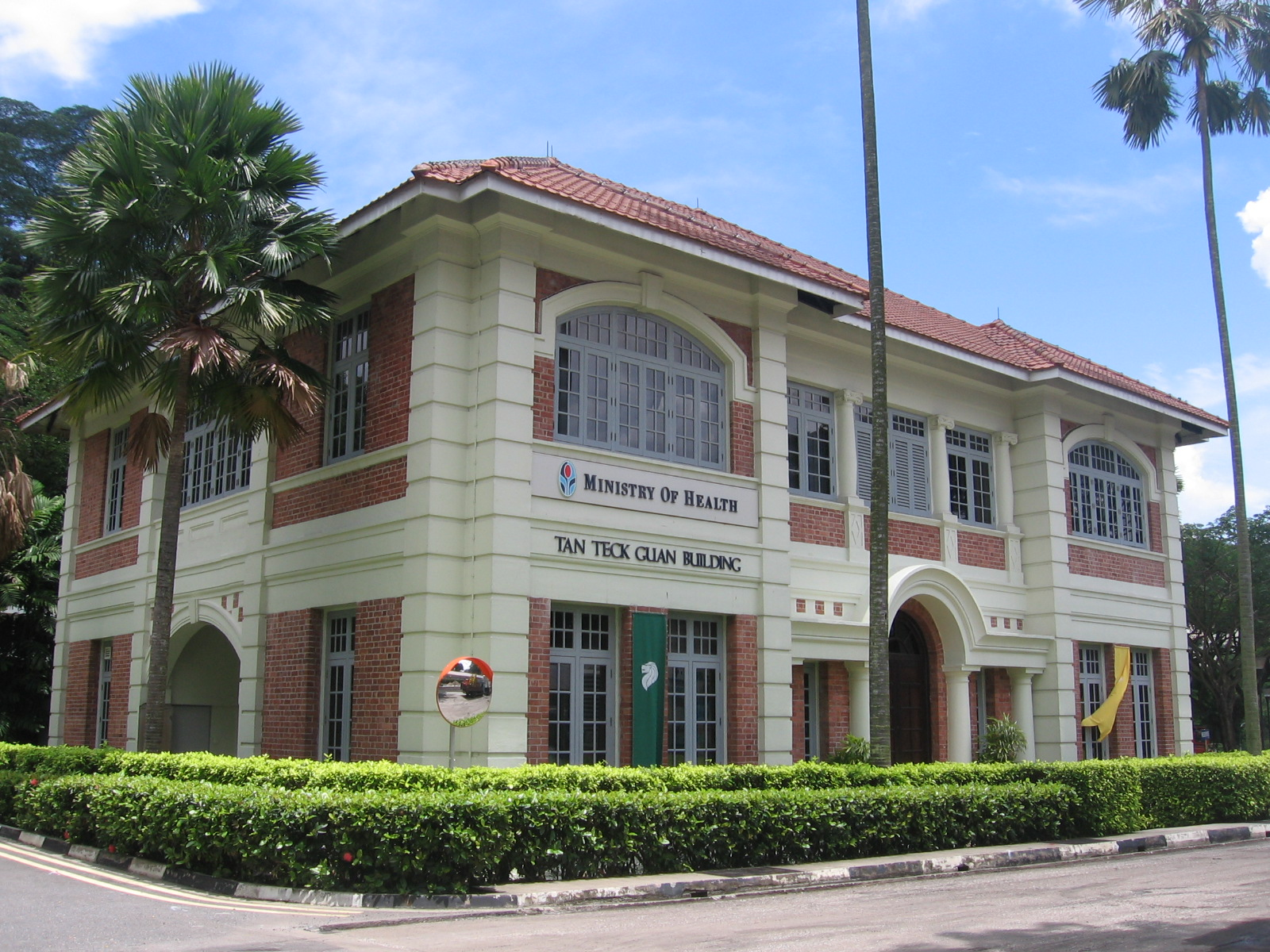
Tan Teck Guan Building

In 1910, Dr Robert Donald Keith became the second Principal of the School. The first two years of the five-year course were devoted to pure science studies. Physics, biology, and chemistry were taught in the first year, followed by physiology and elementary anatomy in the second year. The remaining three years were attachment to clinical clerkships in medicine, surgery, and midwifery, which covered pathology, hygiene, and medical jurisprudence. Materia Medica was integrated into the fourth year, where practical pharmacy was taught.

Students were posted to several hospitals, initially at the Singapore General Hospital. From 1908 onwards, attachments were made to Tan Tock Seng Hospital (for medicine and surgery) and Kandang Kerbau Maternity Hospital (for midwifery).

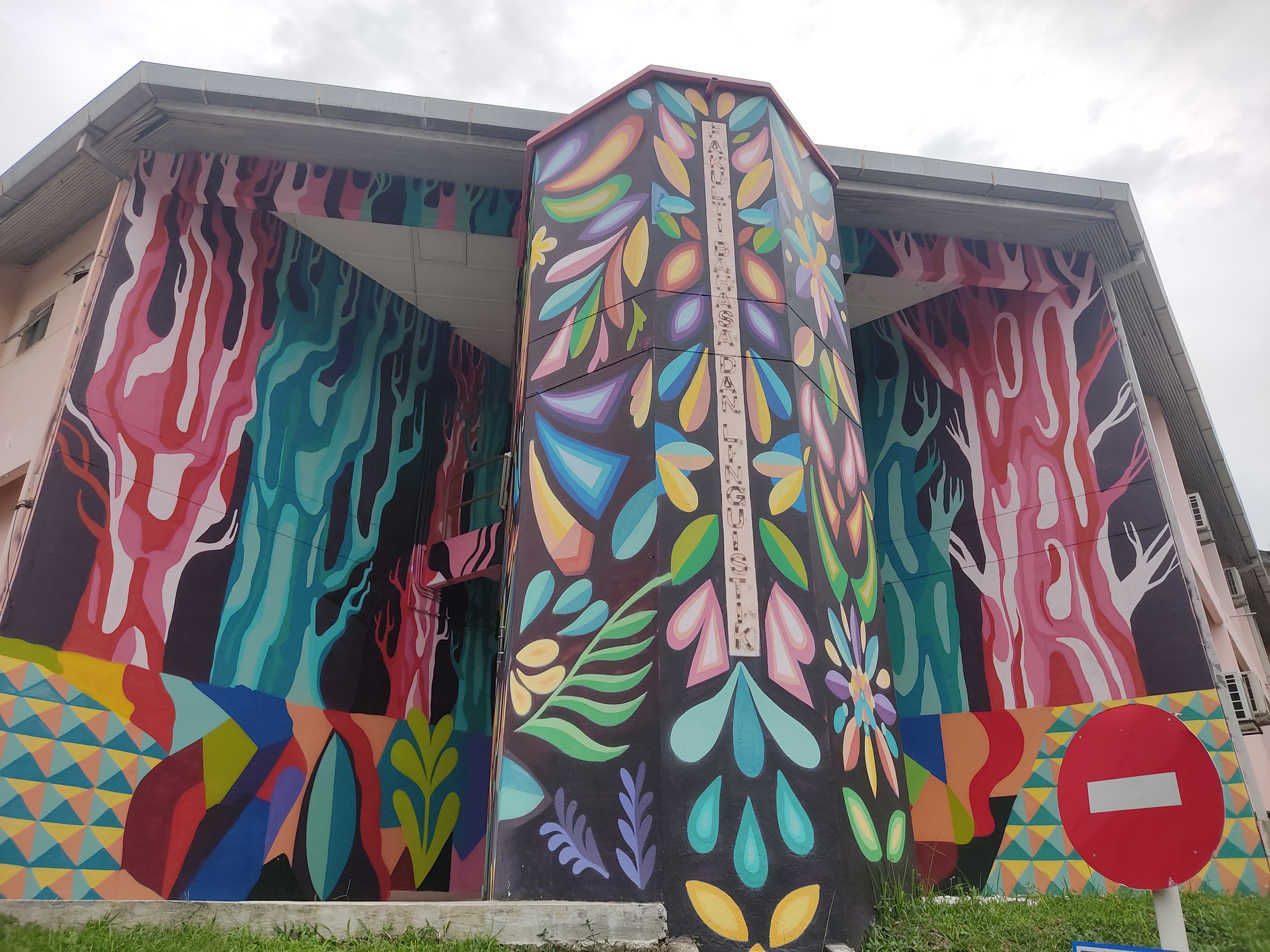
Artwork on The Faculty of Languages and Linguistics building

In 1912, the medical school received a endowment of $120,000 from the King Edward VII Memorial Fund, started by Dr Lim Boon Keng. Subsequently, on 18 November 1913, the name of the school was changed to the King Edward VII School of Medicine.

In the first batch of 16 students of 1905, only seven made it to the final and graduated in May 1910, while the remaining six students graduated four months later, and others resigned from the school. In 1919, the drop-out rate had risen to 35%, while in 1939 the number of students who failed in their final examinations stood at 44%.

At this time, a hostel was built to accommodate 72 male students from the Federated Malay States.

In 1921, the school was elevated in status to a college. Between 1920 and 1930, the college went through a series of transformations, by replacing the old teaching staff with a younger generation of professionals and also nine new Chairs were created, the first in Anatomy in 1920, followed by Medicine, Surgery, and Midwifery & Gynaecology in 1922 and Clinical Surgery, Bacteriology, Biology, Bio-Chemistry, and Dental Surgery in 1926. And the tenth chair for Pathology was created in 1935.

In 1923, the college's new building at Outram Road was commenced. It was completed in November 1925 and officially opened by Sir Laurence Guillemard in February 1926. During the opening ceremony, the college conferred Honorary Diplomas on Sir David James Galloway, Dr Malcolm Watson and Dr Lim Boon Keng.

In 1929, Dr George V. Allen, the new principal, took the helm, succeeding his predecessor, Dr MacAlister.

=== Raffles College ===
The establishment of Raffles College was a brainchild of Sir Stamford Raffles and Dr Robert Morison. Sir Stamford had some knowledge of the Malay language and culture, while Morison was a distinguished Sinologist missionary. Both men wanted to establish a centre dedicated to the study of Malays and Chinese at the tertiary level.

On 5 June 1823, a site designated for an educational institution had its foundation stone laid by Sir Stamford. Soon after that, Raffles left for England and Morrison left for China, thus the establishment of the school never happened. The school building was revived as an English school named the Raffles Institution.

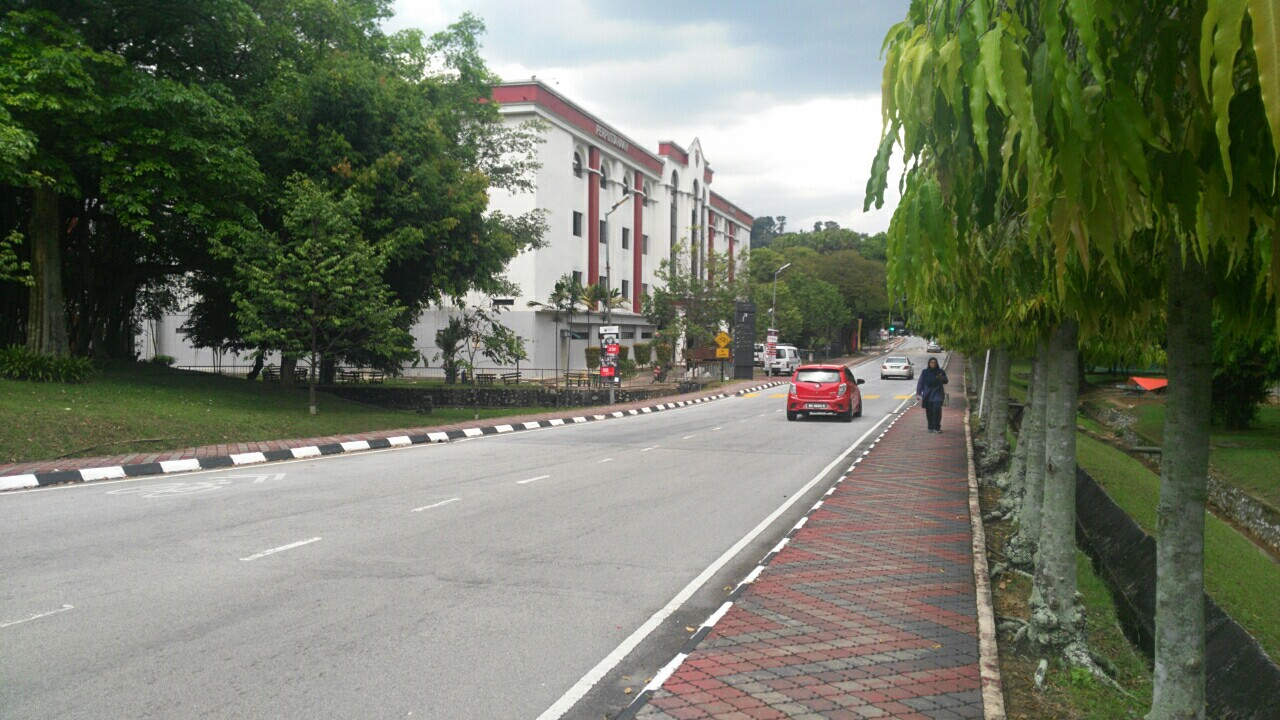
Library Building

In 1918, Sir William George Maxwell, the Colonial Secretary of the Straits Settlements, chaired the Maxwell Committee to review the scheme to commemorate the centenary of the founding of Singapore by Sir Stamford. The committee members were Roland Braddell, A.W. Still, Seah Ling Seah, Dr Lim Boon Keng, Mohammed Yusoff bin Mohammed, N.V. Samy, and Mannesseh Meyer. The working committee, headed by H.W. Firmstone, recommended the establishment of a college for tertiary education to commemorate the centenary founding of Singapore. On 12 July 1919, the Government decided to undertake the construction of the building with a cost not more than $1,000,000 and would contribute $50,000 as annual recurrent expenditure as soon as the Centenary Committee had collected $2,000,000 for the Raffles College Endowment Fund. On 31 August 1920, the committee had achieved the figure, amounting to $2,391,040. On 31 May 1920, Richard Olaf Winstedt was appointed as the Acting Principal of Raffles College. The course offered was on a three-year basis. The establishment of the school was seen far more systematically compared to the King Edward VII Medical College. The school was situated at a site called the Economic Gardens and was designed by Cyril Farey and Graham Dawbarn. And the construction took place in 1926.

Following the completion of the first hostel, Raffles College was opened informally to students on 12 June 1928. Of the first 43 students, nine were private students, and the rest were government-funded; there were two women among this first cohort. On 22 July 1929, Raffles College was formally established. Its students studied either arts or sciences and graduated with a diploma after three years. Science students were permitted to use the labs of the King Edward VII College. Four years later, the College Council proposed changes in the curriculum so that the Diploma could be furthered to a Degree through external examinations in collaboration with universities in England.

In 1937, Sir Shenton Thomas declared the college would have a full-time principal. The college had its fourth principal, Alexander Keir, succeeding Frederick Joseph Morten. By 1939, war was waged in Europe and had put a halt to the development of the college. The war in Europe came to Asia, and Singapore was invaded by the Japanese in February 1942.

After the war, the school was reopened, and W.E. Dyer was the principal. The future of Raffles College was uncertain until 1948 when Dr George V. Allen (later Sir), who was formerly the principal of King Edward VII Medical College, posted as the last principal of Raffles College. The college was amalgamated with the former to establish a university for the Malays.

=== Universiti Malaya (1949–1962) ===
The evolution of the Universiti Malaya

In 1938, the government appointed a commission under the chairmanship of Sir William McLean to study the higher education potential and progress in Malaya. The Commission concluded that Malaya was not ready to have a university and that a university college would be more suitable.

In 1943, Oliver Stanley, the Secretary of State for the Colonies, appointed a commission of inquiry chaired by Cyril Asquith to consider the development of higher education in the colonies across the British Empire. The Asquith Commission, reporting in 1945, endorsed the McLean Commission's recommendations for Malaya.

In 1946, Raymond Priestley, the Vice-Chancellor of Birmingham University and member of the previous Asquith Commission, was invited by the British Malaya Government to visit and discuss the application of the Asquith Commission's recommendations to Singapore and Malaya. Priestley again recommended the establishment of a university college as a first step.

In January 1947, the Secretary of State for the Colonies, now Arthur Creech Jones, appointed Alexander Carr-Saunders, Sir Alexander Carr-Saunders, to chair a commission determining the details of establishing a university college in Malaya. In March of the same year, the other members of the commission were announced, and George Allen, principal of King George VII College, was appointed principal-designate of the planned university college. Carr-Saunders listened to the thoughts of the alumni association and students' union of King Edward VII College; he was impressed with the ideas of the president of the students' union, Kanagaratnam Shanmugaratnam. In 1948, the Carr-Saunders Commission recommended the immediate establishment of a full university, bypassing the intermediate step of a university college recommended by previous commissions.

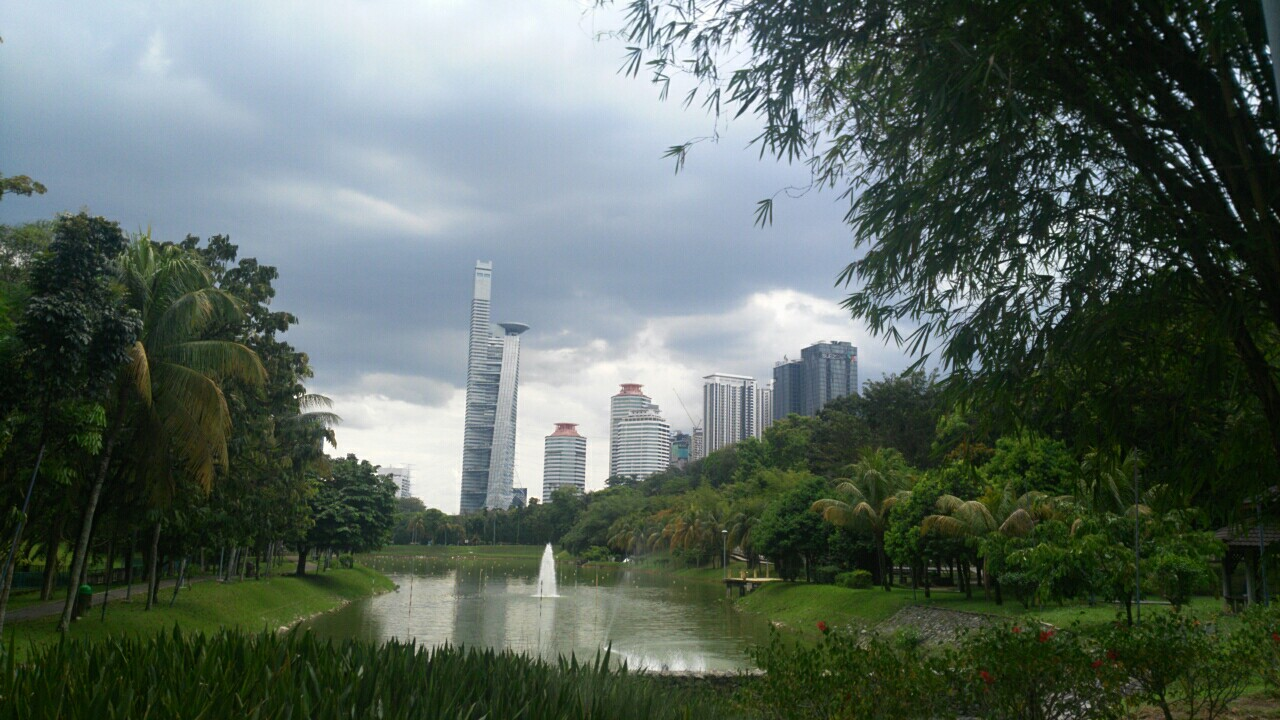
A view of several nearby office buildings from the centre of the UM's campus

As a result, the institution named the Universiti Malaya was chartered under the Carr-Saunders Commission in 1949. The formation of the Universiti Malaya on 8 October 1949 in Bukit Timah Campus (Former site of Raffles College), Singapore came from the merger of King Edward VII College of Medicine and Raffles College, which had been established in 1905 and 1929, respectively.

In the Carr-Saunders Commission's report in 1949, it was stated that "the university shall act as a single medium of mingle for enhancing the understanding among the multi-ethnics and religions in the back of Malaya. The University too should be modelled after the tertiary education in the United Kingdom of Great Britain in terms of academic system and administration structure".

The Carr-Saunders Commission postulates "the principle that all children who show the necessary capacity should enjoy an equal chance of reaching the University; and, in particular, that no able child should be handicapped in climbing the educational ladder by race, religion, rural domicile, or lack of means."

In 1959, the university was divided into two autonomous campuses, one in Singapore, known as University of Malaya in Singapore, and the other in Kuala Lumpur (Universiti Malaya in Kuala Lumpur).

=== Universiti Malaya (re-established 1962) ===
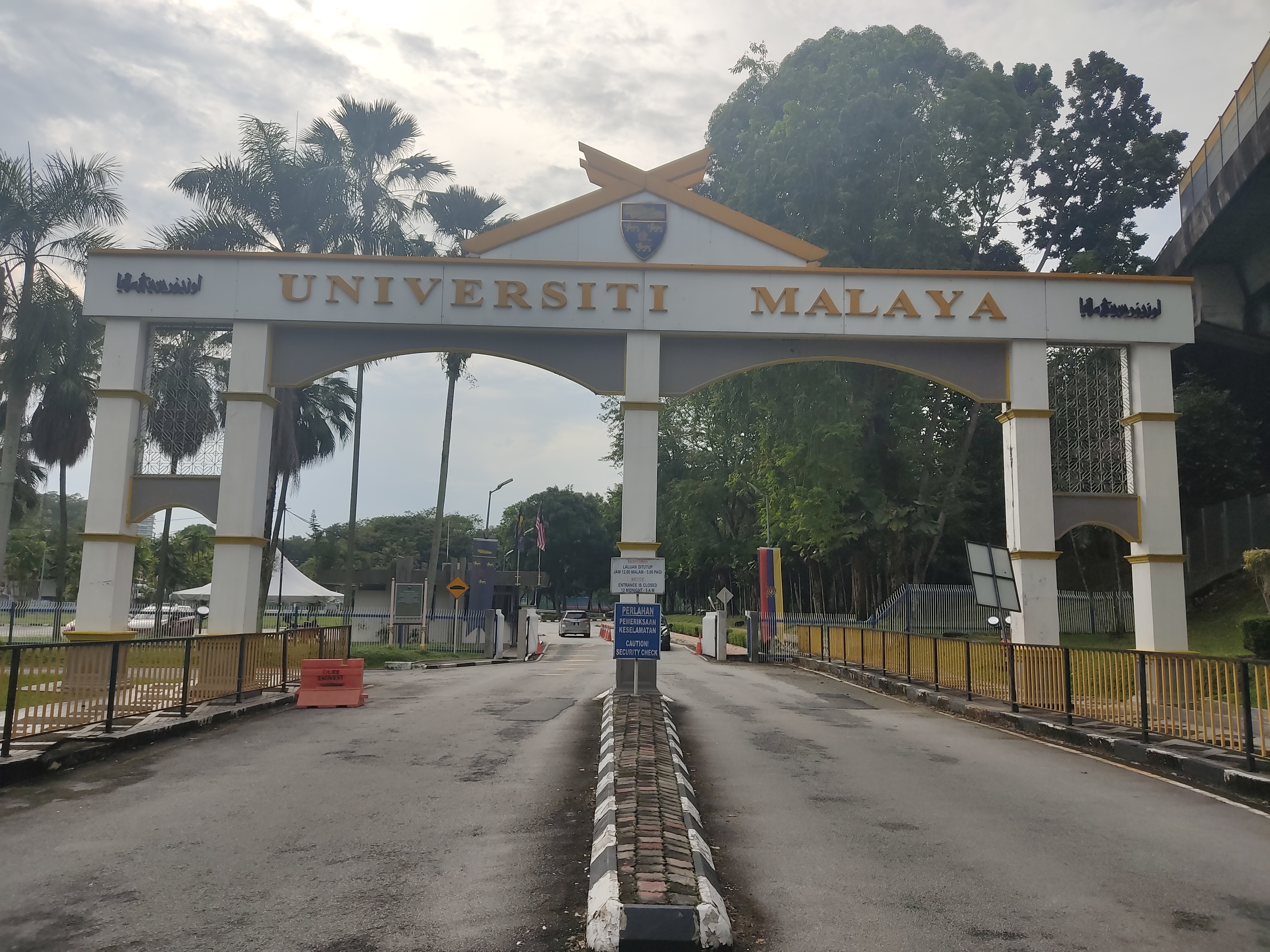
A view of the UM's Kuala Lumpur gate from the road

In 1961, the governments of Malaysia and Singapore passed laws to split the Universiti Malaya into two national universities. As a result, on 1 January 1962, the Universiti Malaya was re-established on the 309-hectare campus in Kuala Lumpur, retaining its original name and becoming the only university in the post-independent Malaya. The Bukit Timah campus in Singapore became the University of Singapore (today the National University of Singapore).

On 16 June 1962, the newly independent university in Kuala Lumpur celebrated the installation of its first Chancellor, Tunku Abdul Rahman, Malaysia's first Prime Minister. The first Vice-Chancellor was former Dean of Arts, Sir Alexander Oppenheim, the mathematician who formulated the Oppenheim conjecture in 1929. When Oppenheim left in 1965 with no successor in sight, Rayson Huang who later became the Vice Chancellor of Nanyang University, Singapore in 1969 and in 1972 went on to become the first Asian Vice-Chancellor of the University of Hong Kong, was asked to take over as the Acting Vice-Chancellor. He served in that capacity for 12 months but declined reappointment to return to academic pursuits.

Chin Fung Kee, an authority in geotechnical engineering, replaced Huang as Acting Vice-Chancellor until the university filled the position in 1967 by the appointment of James H.E. Griffiths. A distinguished physicist and a fellow of Magdalen College, Oxford, Griffiths was also the former head of Clarendon Laboratory of University of Oxford, and one of the discoverers of ferromagnetic resonance.

UM remained Malaysia's primary public university until 1 June 1969, when the nation's second public university – Universiti Sains Malaysia was established in Gelugor on Penang Island.

On 1 March 1997, UM became the first university in Malaysia to be corporatised, in a move intended by the Federal Government to decentralise and transform public universities to become more effective and competitive.

== Coat of arms ==
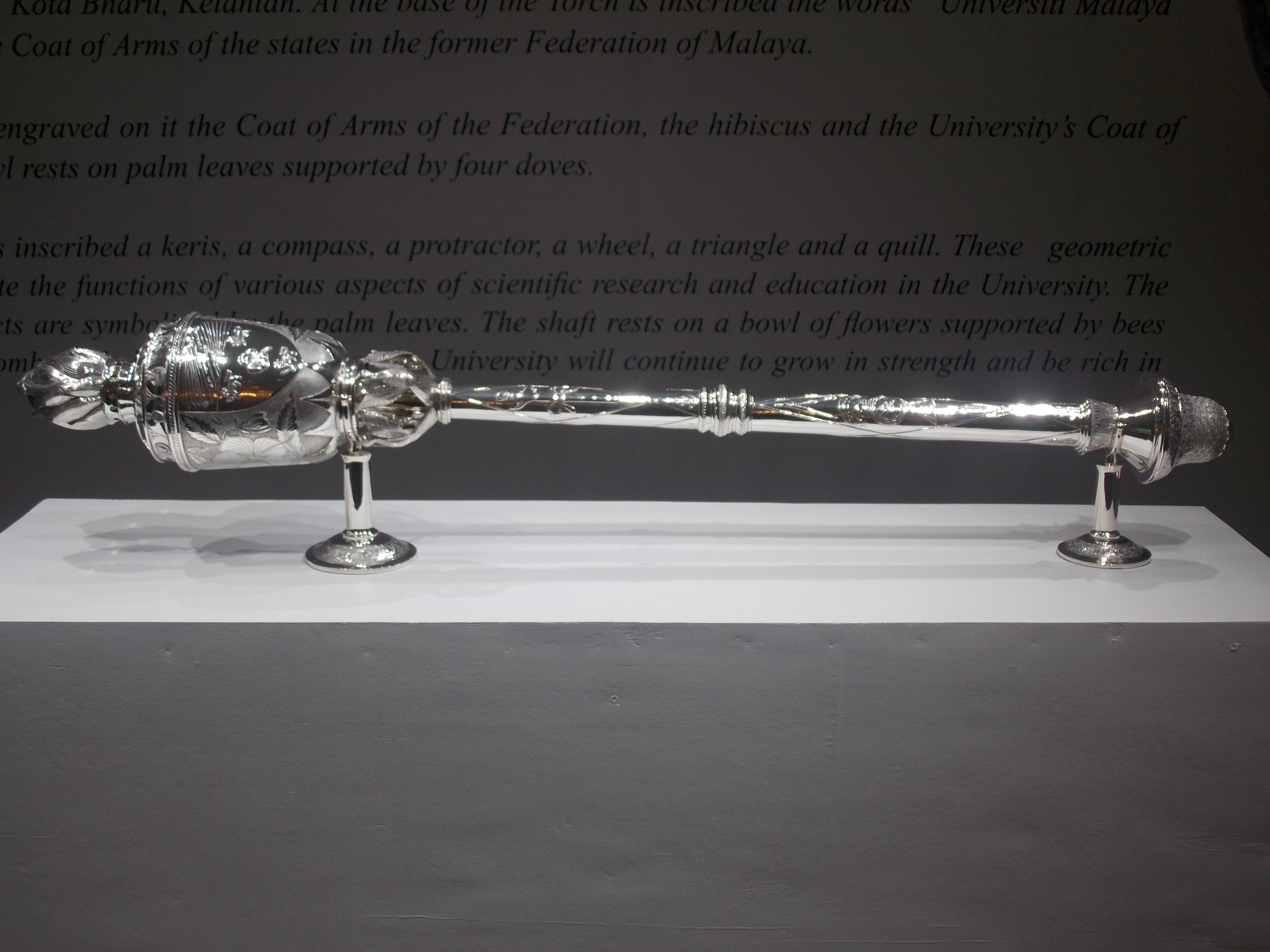
The Universiti Malaya Silver Mace

The UM's coat of arms was designed under a council established in 1961, chaired by Tan Sri Y.C. Foo. The members of the committee involved in the design were the chairman of the council, Y.C. Foo, Professor A. Oppenheim (the vice-chancellor) and Professor Ungku Aziz (later regius professor). The coat of arms was officially chartered in April 1962 by Tunku Abdul Rahman, the university's first chancellor.

The coat of arms is divided into two parts, namely the chief (upper part) and the base (the remainder). The chief is a bundle of seventeen strips of the leaves of Borassus flabellifer or the Palmrya palm. These strips were used as printed material for ancient books by the Malays, long before paper was invented. On the centre of these seventeen strips is the university's motto 'Ilmu Puncha Kemajuan'. The motto consists of 'Ilmu' derived from Arabic, 'Puncha' from Sanskrit (Za'aba Spelling for 'Punca'), and 'Kemajuan' from Malay. These words mean knowledge is the source of progress.

In the centre of the arms is a Bunga Raya or hibiscus rosa-sinensis species encircled by three Malayan tigers. The tigers symbolise the three main races in Malaysia (Malays, Chinese and Indians), who work hand-in-hand to protect the nation and uphold the duty to serve the country. It is blazoned:

Azure, parted per fess by a line Or. In base a Bunga Raya (hibiscus flower) between three tigers passant regardant two and one all proper; and in Chief a bundle of seventeen strips of the leaves of Palmyra Palm Or inscribed with the words 'ILMU PUNCHA KEMAJUAN'.

The current arms design was derived from the original arms in 1949, which was blazoned as such:

Per fess Azure and Argent, in base a tiger passant reguardant proper; in chief an open book also proper, bound, edged and clasped Or.

== Academic profile ==
University rankings

Global – Overall
- ARWU World: 601-700 (2026)
- CWTS World: 304 (2025)
- QS World: 56 (2027)
- THE World: 194 (2027)
- USNWR Global: 311 (2026-2027)

Regional – Overall
- CWTS Asia: 131 (2025)
- QS Asia: 15 (2026)
- THE Asia: 64 (2025)
- USNWR Asia: 80 (2025)

National – Overall
- QS National: 1 (2026)

Currently UM is ranked 58th in the world in the QS World University Rankings 2026, 331st in the USNWR 2025 global rankings, 304th in the 2025 CWTS Leiden Ranking, and among the top 200 universities in the 2026 Times Higher Education (THE) World University Rankings.

The business school of UM has achieved two international accreditations i.e. Association to Advance Collegiate Schools of Business (AACSB) and Association of MBAs (AMBA).

The Faculty of Languages and Linguistics, Japanese Language and Linguistic Course was awarded the Japanese Foreign Minister's Commendation for their contributions to promotion of Japanese language education in Malaysia on 1 December 2020.

Ranking	2025	2024	2023	2022	2021	2020
QS World University Rankings	60	65	70	65	59	70
U.S. News & World Report Rankings	331	281	226	205	205	232
Times Higher Education World University Rankings	251-300	251-300	351-400	301-350	301-350	301-350

=== Faculties ===
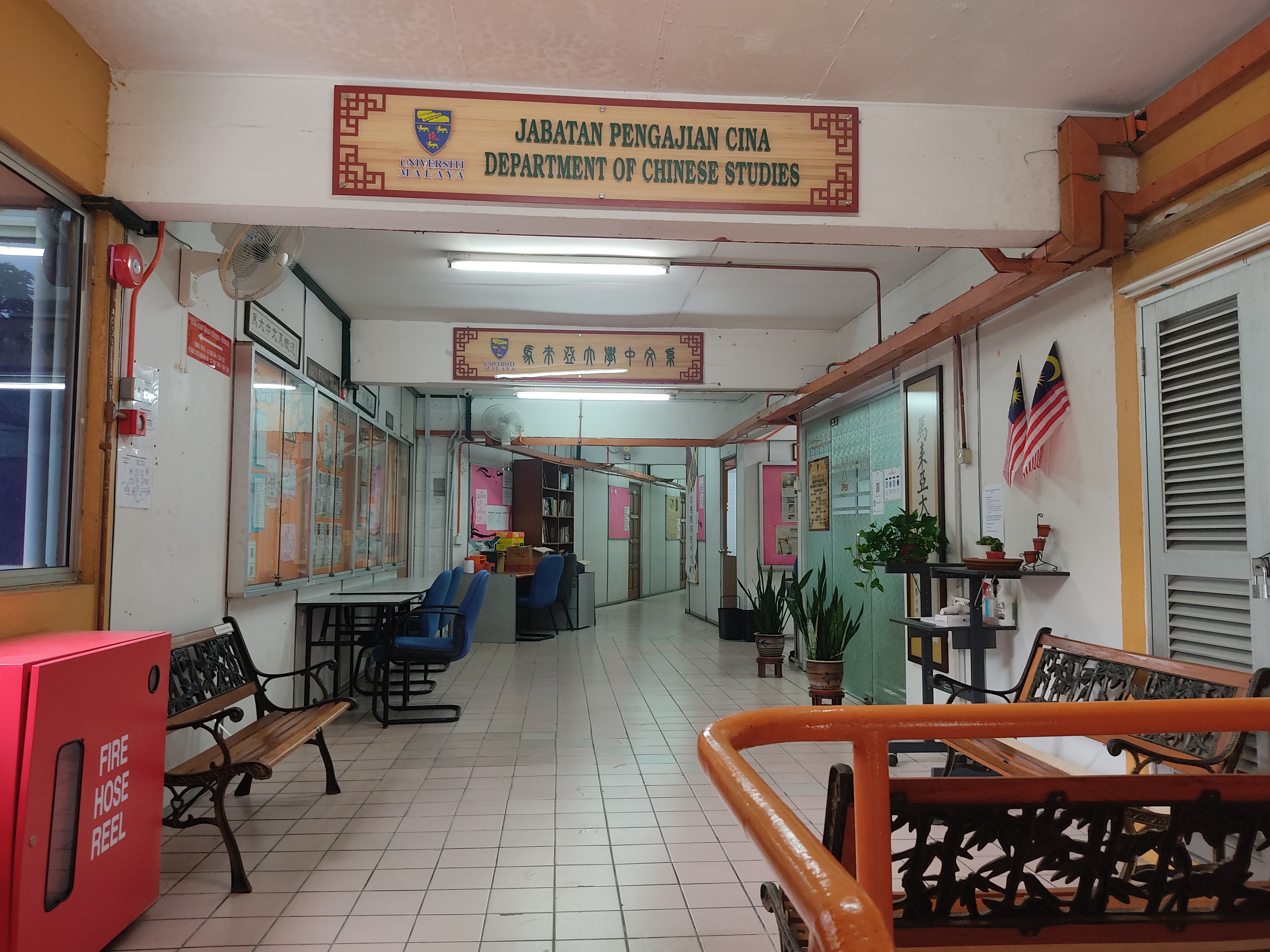
Department of Chinese Studies

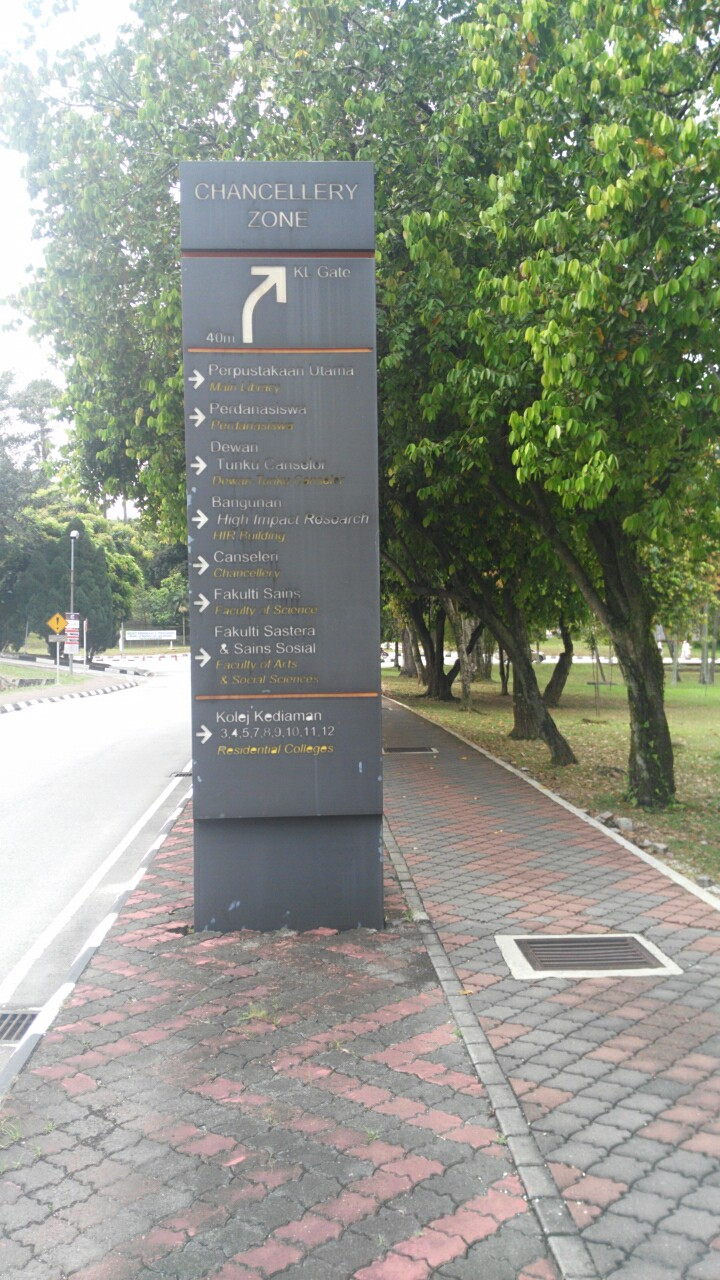
Street signage

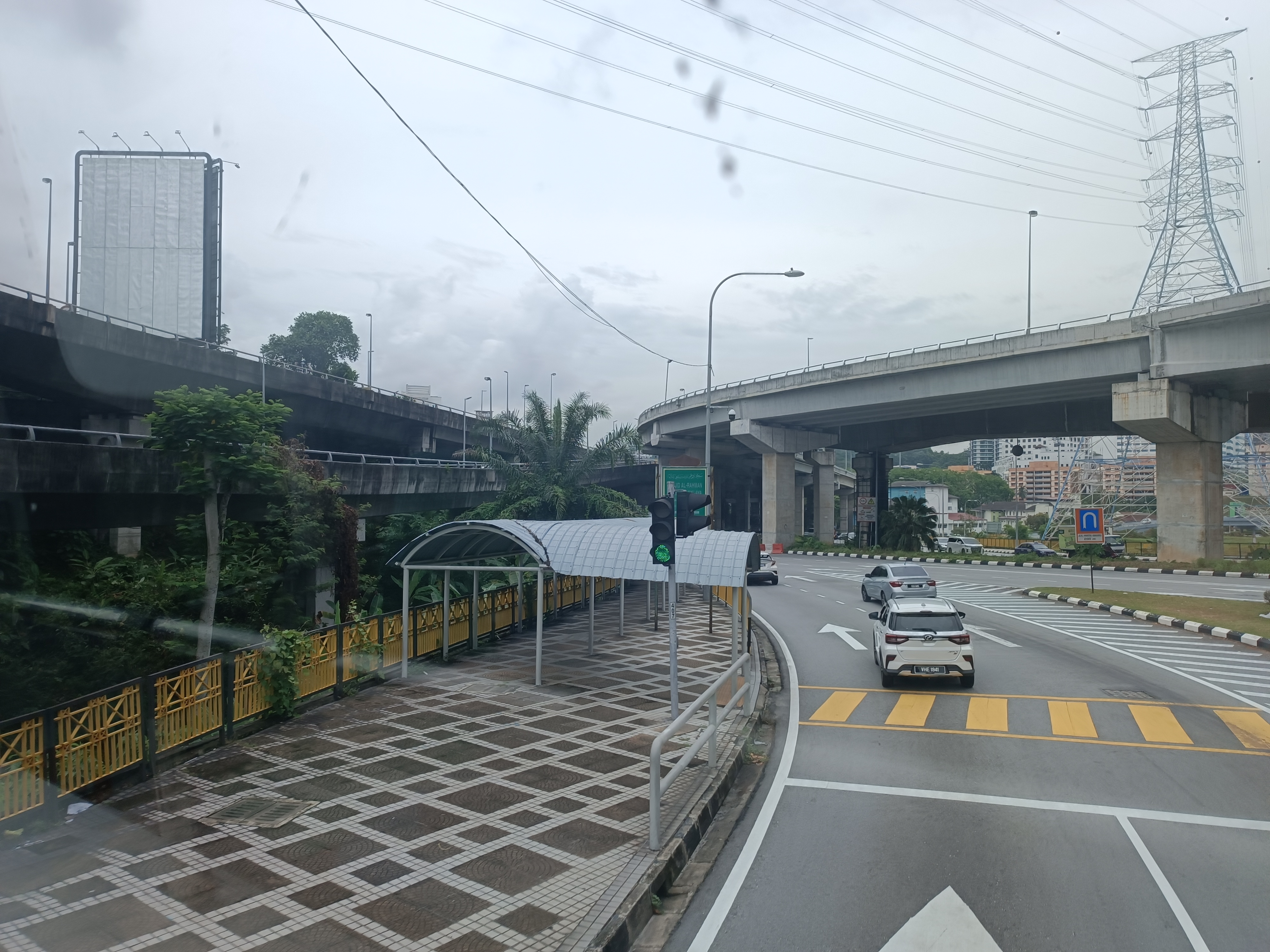
Covered walkway from Universiti LRT Station to UM KL gate

MRT Feeder Bus Route T815 to Phileo Damansara station

Shuttle Bus Terminal

==== Faculty of Arts and Social Sciences ====
Department of Chinese Studies

The Department of Chinese Studies (Chinese: 马来亚大学中文系), commonly known as UM Chinese Studies was established in 1963, and the department is one of the earliest university-level Chinese studies units in Southeast Asia. The department offers undergraduate and postgraduate programmes in Chinese studies. In addition to teaching, it conducts research in Chinese language, literature, culture, and Sinology, and organises academic conferences, public lectures, student orientation activities, and outreach programmes. The department's stated objectives include advancing Sinological scholarship, promoting the translation of Chinese classics, and contributing research expertise to the humanities and social sciences, while fostering intercultural understanding within Malaysia's multilingual society. The dean of the department is Datuk Professor Dr. Danny Wong Tze Ken.

==== Faculty of Dentistry ====
The Faculty of Dentistry (Malay: Fakulti Pergigian) was established in 1971 and traces its origins to the Dental Department of the King Edward VII College of Medicine (1927–1949) and the University of Malaya's Department of Dentistry in Singapore (1949–1961), making it the oldest dental school in the country. The faculty is located in Kuala Lumpur, near the University Malaya Medical Centre, Malaysia's largest teaching hospital. The faculty offers a five-year Bachelor of Dental Surgery (BDS) program, first introduced in 1972. For postgraduate studies, the faculty provides disciplines including oral surgery, orthodontics, and oral cancer research, combining clinical coursework, research, and international collaborations. The dean of the faculty is Professor Dr. Firdaus Hariri.

== Organisation and administration ==
=== Vice-chancellors ===
This is a list of vice-chancellors of the Universiti Malaya.

No.	Vice-Chancellor	Honour	Qualifications	Term in Office
Before Independence	Sir Dr. George V. Allen	CBE, Kt, LL.D. (Malaya, Belfast and Aberdeen), D.Sc. (Kent)	MD, MB, BCh, BAO (Belfast), DTM&H (Lond.)	1949–1952
Before Independence	Sir Dr. Sydney Caine	KCMG, LL.D. (Malaya)	BSc (LSE)	1952–1956
1	Professor Tan Sri Sir Dr. Alexander Oppenheim	OBE, PMN, KT, LL.D. (Malaya)	PhD (UC), D.Sc. (Oxon)	1956–1965
Acting	Dr. Rayson Huang Li Song	CBE, ORS, JP, D.Sc. (HKU)	D.Phil (Oxon), D.Sc. (Oxon), D.Sc. (Malaya), BSc (HKU)	1965–1966
Acting	Professor Emeritus Tan Sri Datuk Dr. Chin Fung Kee	JMN, PSM, DMPN, D.Sc. (Belfast, Singapore, and Glasgow)	MEng (Belfast), BEng (Civil) (Belfast), Dip. Arts (Raffles College)	1966–1967
2	Dr. James H.E. Griffiths	OBE	PhD (Oxon), MA (Oxon)	1967–1968
3	Regius Professor Dr. Ungku Abdul Aziz bin Ungku Abdul Hamid	Regius Professor (Malaya)	PhD (Waseda), Dip. Arts (Raffles College)	1968–1988
4	Professor Dato' Dr. Syed Hussein Alatas	DSPN	PhD (Amsterdam)	1988–1991
5	Professor Emeritus Datuk Dr. Mohd. Taib Osman	JSM	PhD (Indiana), MA (Malaya), BA (Malaya)	1991–1994
6	Tan Sri Dato' Dr. Abdullah Sanusi Ahmad	PSM, KMN, DSNS	PhD (USC), MA (Pitt) BA (Malaya)	1994–2000
7	Professor Dato' Dr. Anuar Zaini Md. Zain	DPMP	MBBS (Malaya)	2000–2003
8	Professor Emeritus Datuk Dr. Hashim Yaacob	DPSK, SPSK	MSc (Lond.), BDS (Otago)	2003–2006
9	Tan Sri Datuk Dr. Rafiah Salim	PSM, Hon. DUniv (Belfast)	LL.D. (Belfast), LL.M. (Belfast)	2006–2008
10	Tan Sri Datuk Dr. Ghauth Jasmon	PSM, DMSM	PhD (Lond.), BEng (Electrical) (Lond.)	2008–2013
11	Professor Tan Sri Dato' Dr. Mohd. Amin Jalaludin	PSM, DPMS	MBBS (Malaya), FRCS (Royal College of Surgeons of Edinburgh)	2013–2017
12	Datuk Ir. (Dr.) Abdul Rahim Hj. Hashim	PJN, D.Eng (Birmingham)	BEng (Birmingham)	2017–2020
13	Professor Dato' Ir. Dr. Mohd. Hamdi Abd. Shukor	DPNS	D.Eng (Kyoto), MSc (UMIST), BEng (Hons) (Mech) (Imperial)	2020–2023
14	Professor Dato' Seri Ir. Dr. Noor Azuan Abu Osman	DGPN	PhD (Strathclyde), MSc (Strathclyde), BEng (Hons) (Mech) (Bradford)	2023–Present

== Student life ==
=== Student bodies ===
The UM's campus student bodies, known as Universiti Malaya Students' Union (UMSU) are elected by the students to have representatives engaging in policies and matters relating to student affairs. As such the elections, known as 'PRKUM' which is acronym for Pilihanraya Kampus Universiti Malaya in Malay language is seen as a precursor to a student leader. Whilst prior elections before 2019 was organised by the Student Affairs Department of the university, the first election managed by the students was conducted on 4 March 2019, marking a historic first whereby an all student affair made the elections a milestone. Suara Siswa, a pro-student group won the elections which saw 61% of 13,671 students cast their votes. UM also has its own radio station, UMalaya Radio which is under the auspices of its Student & Alumni Affairs Division.

== Facilities ==
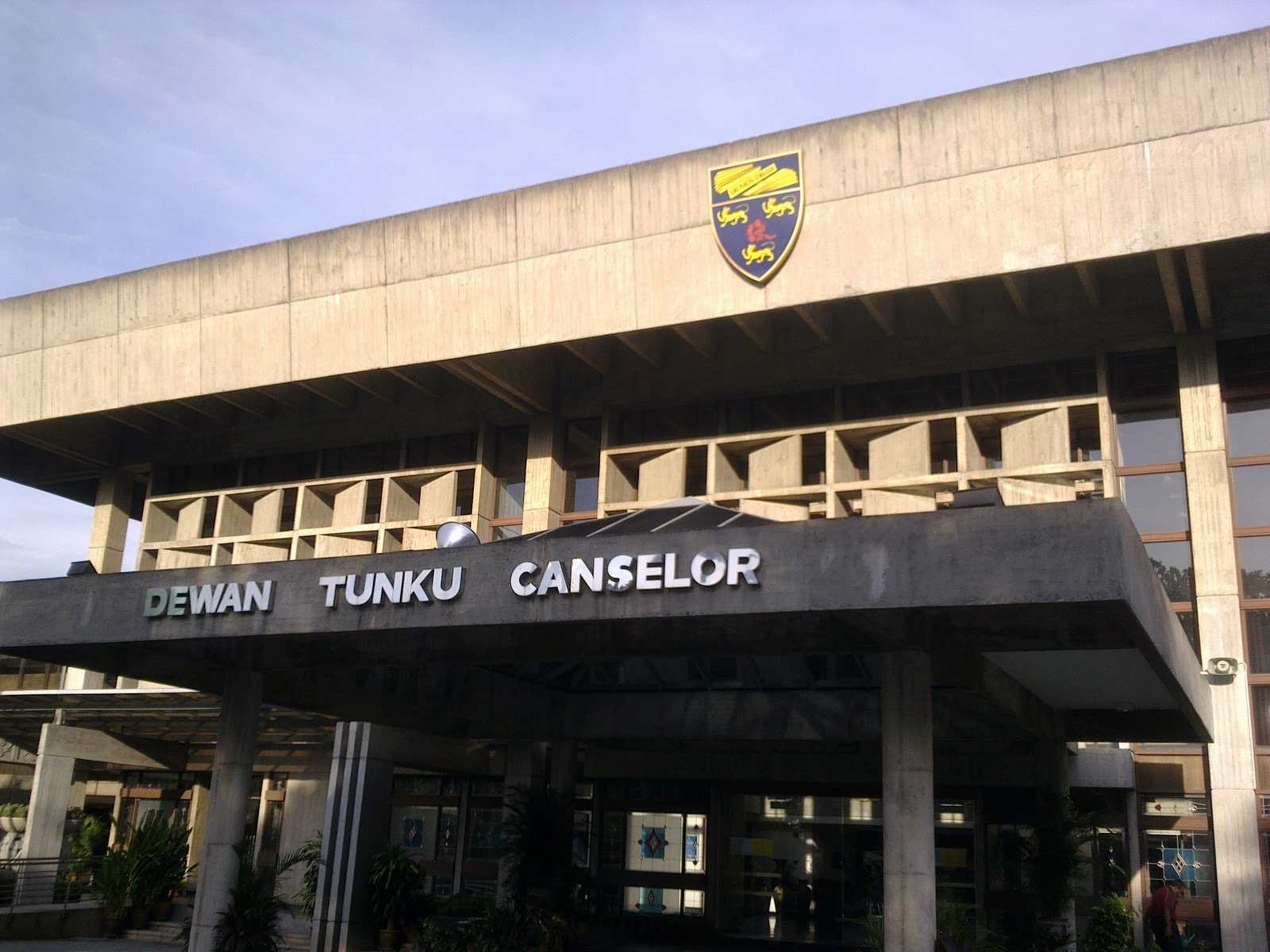
Dewan Tunku Canselor

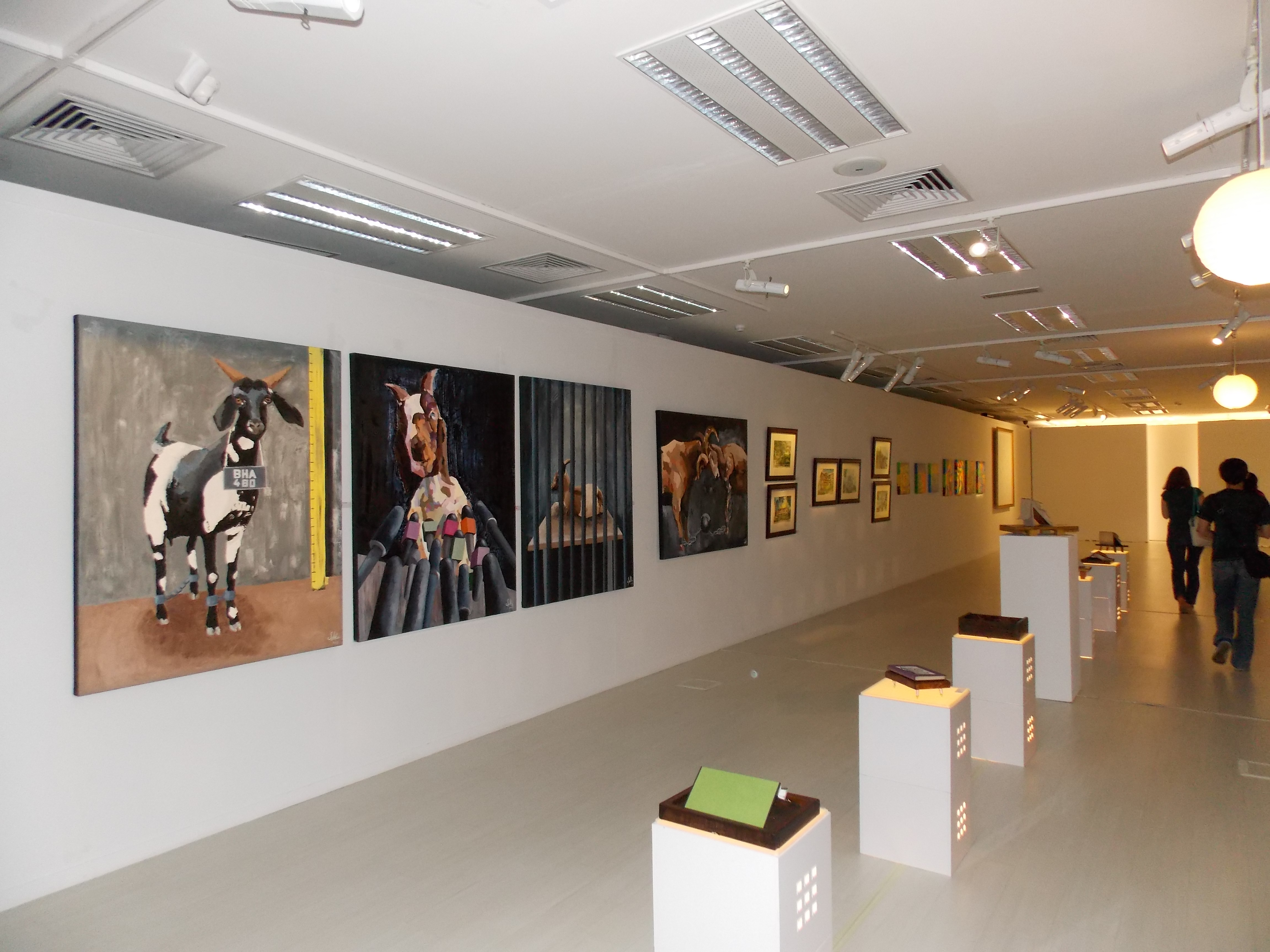
Malaya Art Gallery

Rimba Ilmu building, Universiti Malaya

The university houses 13 residential colleges (11 in-campus, 2 off-campus), an Olympic-sized swimming pool, the Rimba Ilmu Botanical Gardens, the UM Arena which boasts a full course running track, several museums of different fields as well as numerous sports facilities (gymnasiums, courts and fields) in the campus. The university's teaching hospital, Universiti Malaya Medical Centre (UMMC) is located at the boundaries of UM near the Petaling Jaya gate.

=== Residential colleges ===
Unlike other global universities, colleges in UM does not function as accommodation and institution. They are only functioned as hostels for students.

During the pandemic, all colleges were at limited capacity or closed. In September 2021, they were in the process of being reopened in conjunction with the loosening of pandemic measures by the government. Many colleges have their own basic facilities, such as a restaurant. In the 12th college (UM labels their residential colleges by name and dedicated number) lies a well known hipster cafe called He and She Coffee.

== In the media ==
UM became a subject matter in the 1987 documentary film, Dari Desa Ke Kampus (lit. From the Countryside to the Campus), produced by Filem Negara Malaysia.

== Notable alumni ==
Prime Ministers of Malaysia

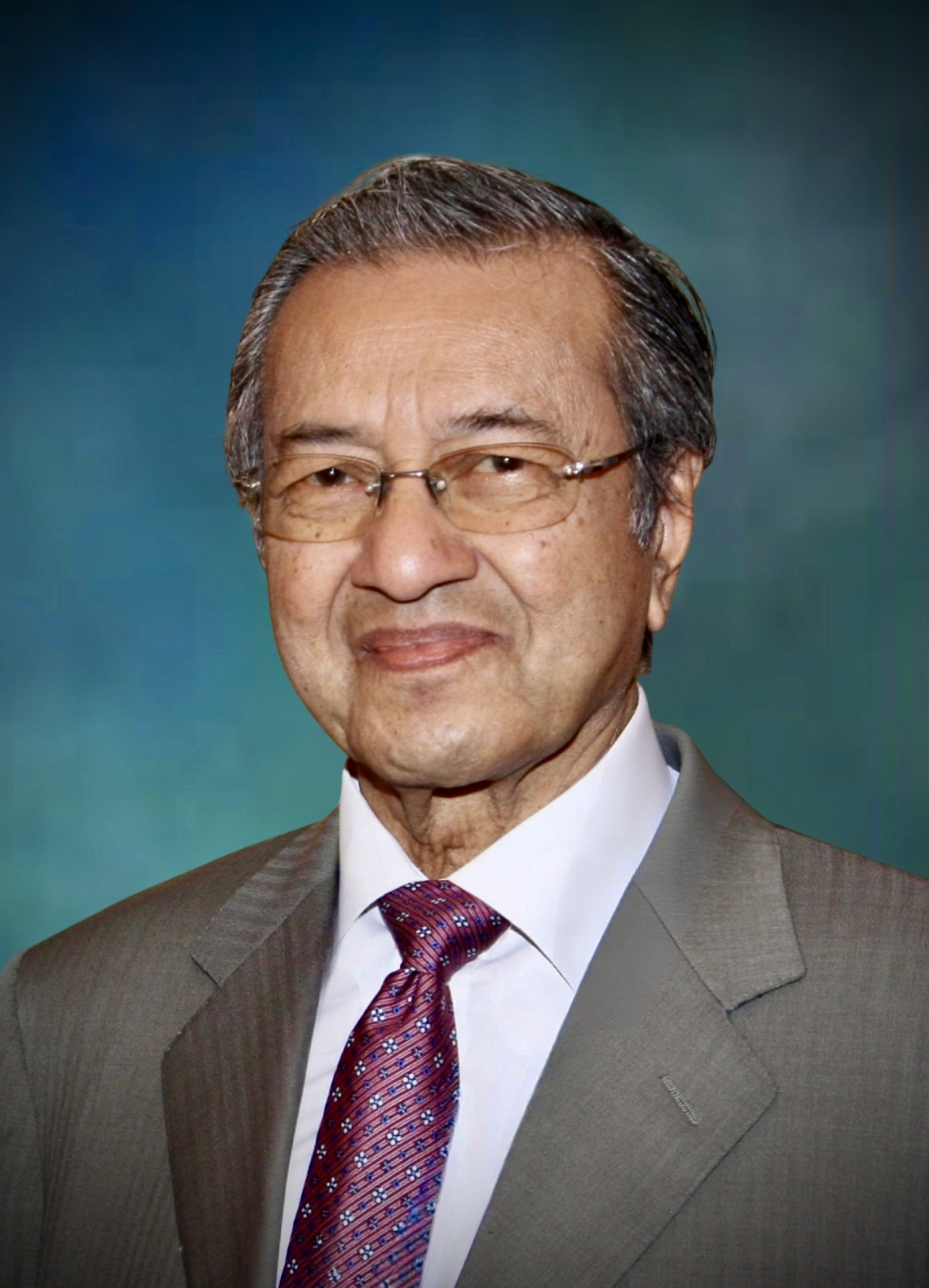
Mahathir Mohamad
'53 Medicine

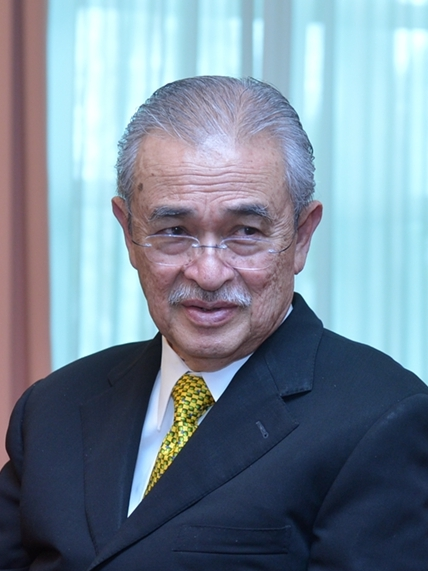
Abdullah Ahmad Badawi
'64 Social Science

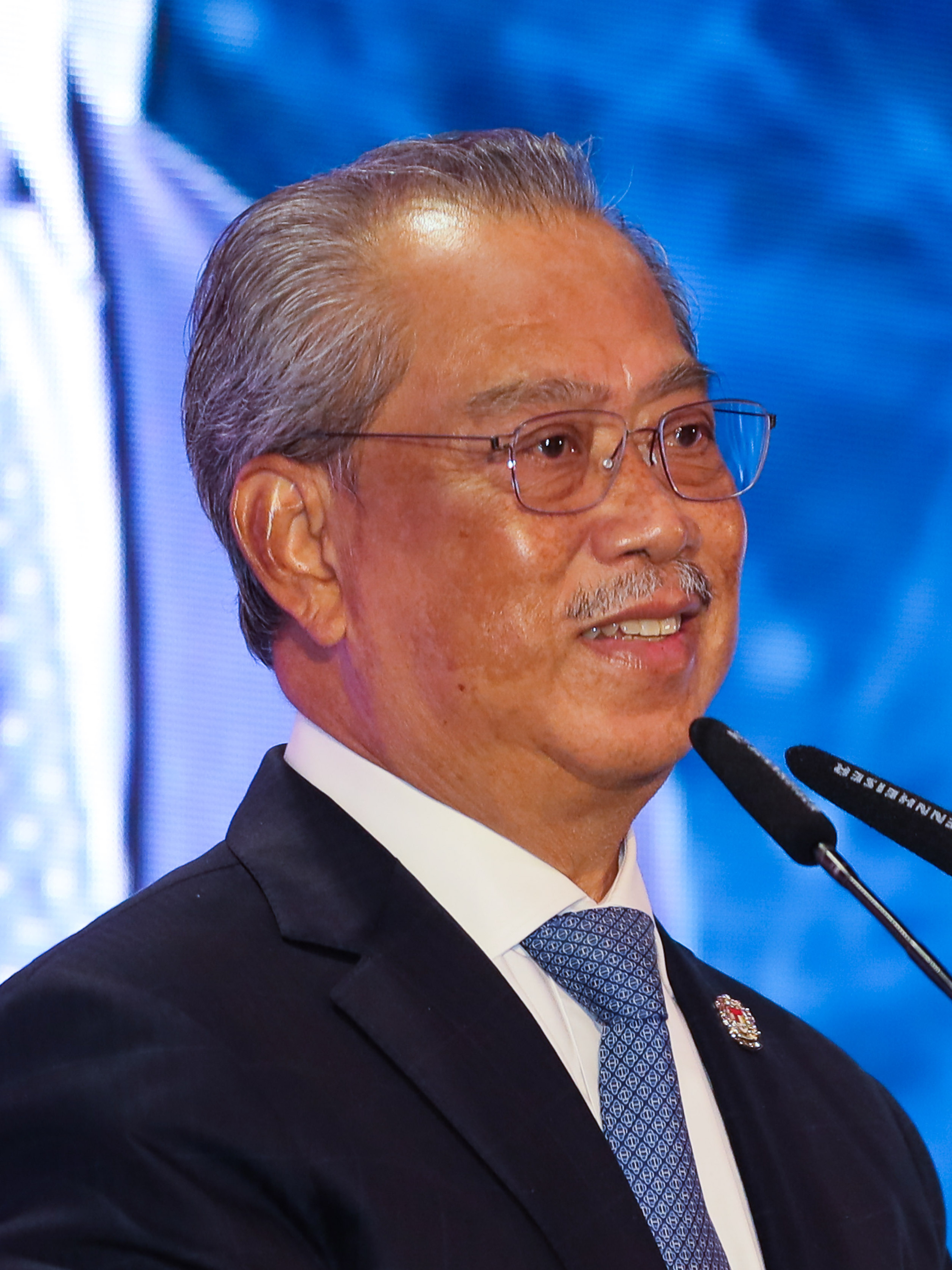
Muhyiddin Mohd Yassin
'71 Economics

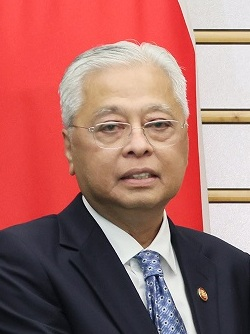
Ismail Sabri Yaakob
'80 Law

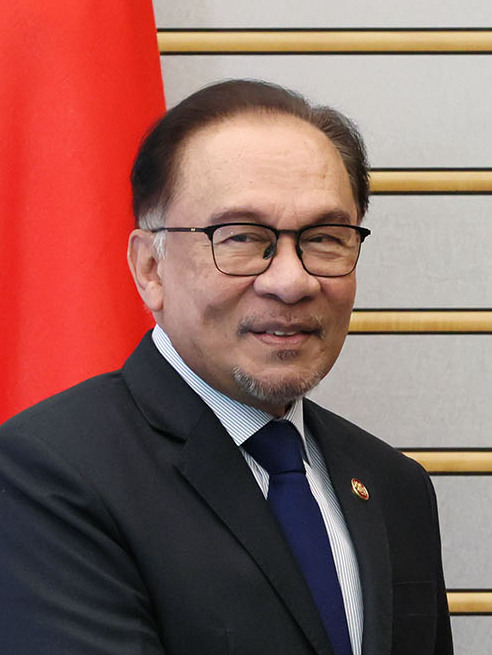
Anwar Ibrahim
'71 Social Science

Multiple alumni of UM were noted to have played significant role in the development of Malaysia, and its graduates have been notable in various fields within the country. Five out of nine Malaysian Prime Ministers were UM alumni, with Mahathir Mohamad becoming the only prime minister to be elected twice. Numerous UM graduates have been elected as members of parliament to the Dewan Rakyat, senators to the Dewan Negara, members of the State Legislative Assembly, as well as being ministers of the federal cabinet, chief ministers, governors, and speakers to both houses of representatives. Notable politicians include current Speaker of the Dewan Rakyat Johari Abdul, former president of the Dewan Negara Vigneswaran Sanasee, former Minister of Finance Daim Zainuddin who finished his doctoral thesis at UM, former Yang di-Pertua Negeri of Malacca and Menteri Besar of Pahang Mohd Khalil Yaakob, and Member of Parliament for Sungai Buloh and Rhodes Scholar Sivarasa Rasiah.

UM has also produced a large number of lawyers, diplomats and public servants that have hold top posts within their respective fields. In diplomacy and foreign affairs, 51st President of the United Nations General Assembly Razali Ismail, and 8th Secretary General of the ASEAN Ajit Singh, both studied at UM for their undergraduate degrees. More than half of the Chief Secretary to the Government of Malaysia has been a graduate from UM where out of fifteen of them, eight has studied at UM, where Ismail Bakar is the most recent alumnus to hold the post. Two former Inspector-General of the Royal Malaysian Police Norian Mai and Mohamad Fuzi Harun also attended UM. In law, two Chief Justice of Malaysia, three President of the Court of Appeal of Malaysia, three Attorney General of Malaysia, three Chief Judge of Malaya and one Chief Judge of Sabah and Sarawak have all attended UM Law School.

Four governors of the Malaysian central bank, Bank Negara Malaysia, Ali Abul Hassan bin Sulaiman, Zeti Akhtar Aziz, Muhammad bin Ibrahim, and Shaik Abdul Rasheed Abdul Ghaffour all studied commerce at UM. Business people include billionaires such as the founder and chairman of Top Glove Corporation Bhd, Lim Wee-Chai, CEO of Westports Holdings G. Gnanalingam, founder and chairman of Public Bank Berhad Teh Hong Piow, and founder of NagaCorp Ltd Chen Lip Keong.

Various corporate figures such as the former chairman, president and CEO of Petronas Azizan Zainul Abidin, president and CEO of Maybank Amirsham Abdul Aziz, co-founder of AirAsia Pahamin Rajab, and former CEO of Permodalan Nasional Berhad Khalid Ibrahim.

Two of Malaysia's only regius professors Ungku Aziz and Syed Muhammad Naquib al-Attas have been affiliated with UM during the early years of the university. All four out of five distinguished professors in Malaysia which include Shamsul Amri Baharuddin, Mohd Kamal Hassan, Harith Ahmad, and Looi Lai Meng have all studied at the university with the exception of Rajah Rasiah who is currently affiliated with UM.

In literature and the arts, five Malaysian National Laureates have studied in UM which include writer and Tokoh Akademi Negara Muhammad Haji Salleh, novelists Anwar Ridhwan and Siti Zainon Ismail, writer Baha Zain and the first female recipient of the award, Zurinah Hassan. Moreover, various UM alumnus have won the Southeast Asian Writers Award, including novelist Malim Ghozali PK and author Adibah Amin.

== See also ==
- The National University of Malaysia
- List of Islamic educational institutions
- Universiti Malaya Medical Centre
- UM Specialist Centre
- Faculty of Medicine, Universiti Malaya
- Centre for Foundation Studies, Universiti Malaya
- UM Botanical Gardens Rimba Ilmu
- National University of Singapore
- University of Malaya-Wales
- UM-Damansara United
