= Lim Wee-Chai =

Malaysian businessman

Lim Wee Chai 林伟才
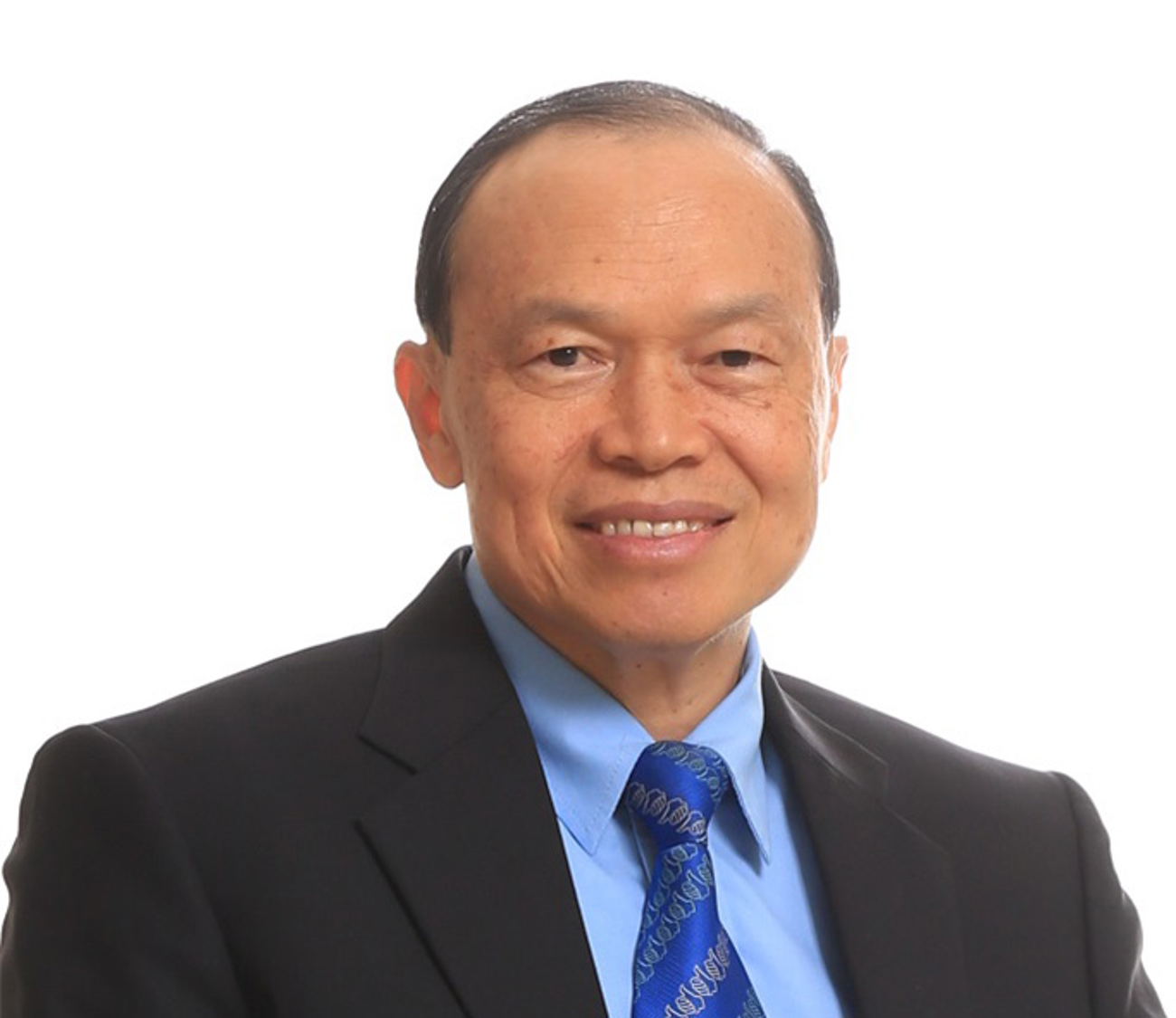
- Born: 7 January 1958 (age 68)
- Education: University Malaya (BSc); Sul Ross State University (MBA); University of Selangor (PhD)
- Occupation: Businessman
- Title: Founder and Executive Chairman of Top Glove Corporation Bhd

Chinese name
- Simplified Chinese: 林伟才
- Traditional Chinese: 林偉才
Transcriptions
Standard Mandarin
- Hanyu Pinyin: Lín Wěi Cái
- Wade–Giles: Lin^{2} Wei^{3} Cai^{2}
- IPA: [lin wèɪ tsʰǎɪ]
Yue: Cantonese
- Jyutping: Lam4 Wai5 Coi4
Southern Min
- Hokkien POJ: Lîm Úi-châi
- Tâi-lô: Lîm Uí-tsâi

Lim Wee Chai (simplified Chinese: 林伟才; traditional Chinese: 林偉才; pinyin: Lín Wěicái) is a Malaysian businessman. He is the Executive Chairman and Founder of Top Glove Corporation Bhd, a glove manufacturing company, which was founded in 1991 and is listed on Bursa Malaysia (Kuala Lumpur Stock Exchange) and the main board of the Singapore Exchange (SGX). Lim was listed by Forbes as Malaysia's 8th richest person in 2021.

== Early life and education ==
Lim was born and raised in the Chinese New Village of Titi, Jelebu, Negeri Sembilan. He grew up in his family's shophouse. He attended SJK(C) Chun Yin for his primary education and secondary education at the SM Undang Jelebu. Lim's family ran a rubber trading business, and he would help out in the estate during weekends.

Lim graduated with a Bachelor of Science Degree with Honours in Physics in 1982, from University Malaya. After graduation, he worked as an air conditioner sales executive in OYL Industries, a Malaysian air conditioner manufacturer. He obtained a Masters of Business Administration in 1985 from Sul Ross State University in Texas, United States. Lim returned to Malaysia and continued working under his former employer as a sales manager.

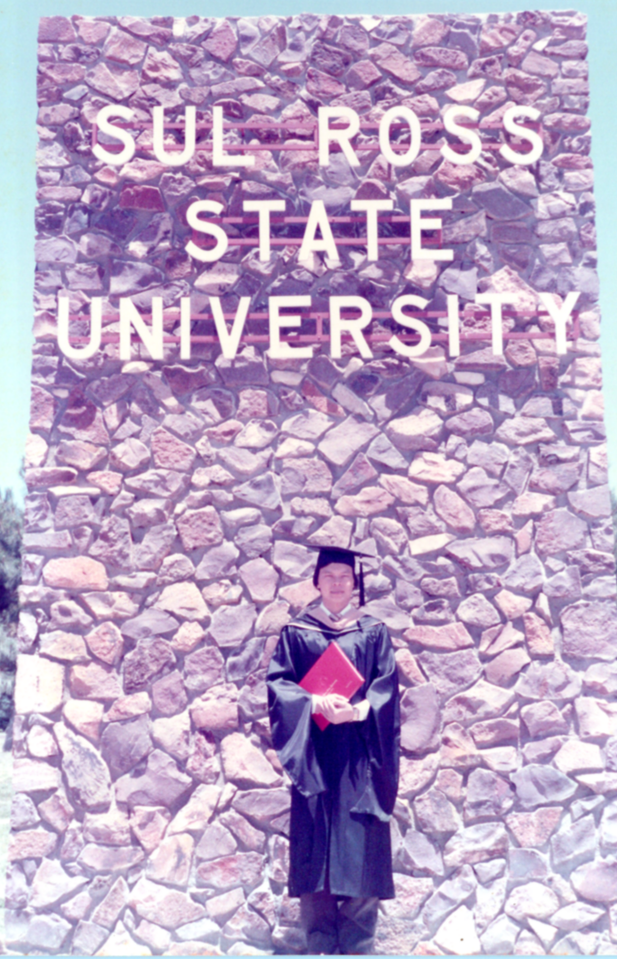
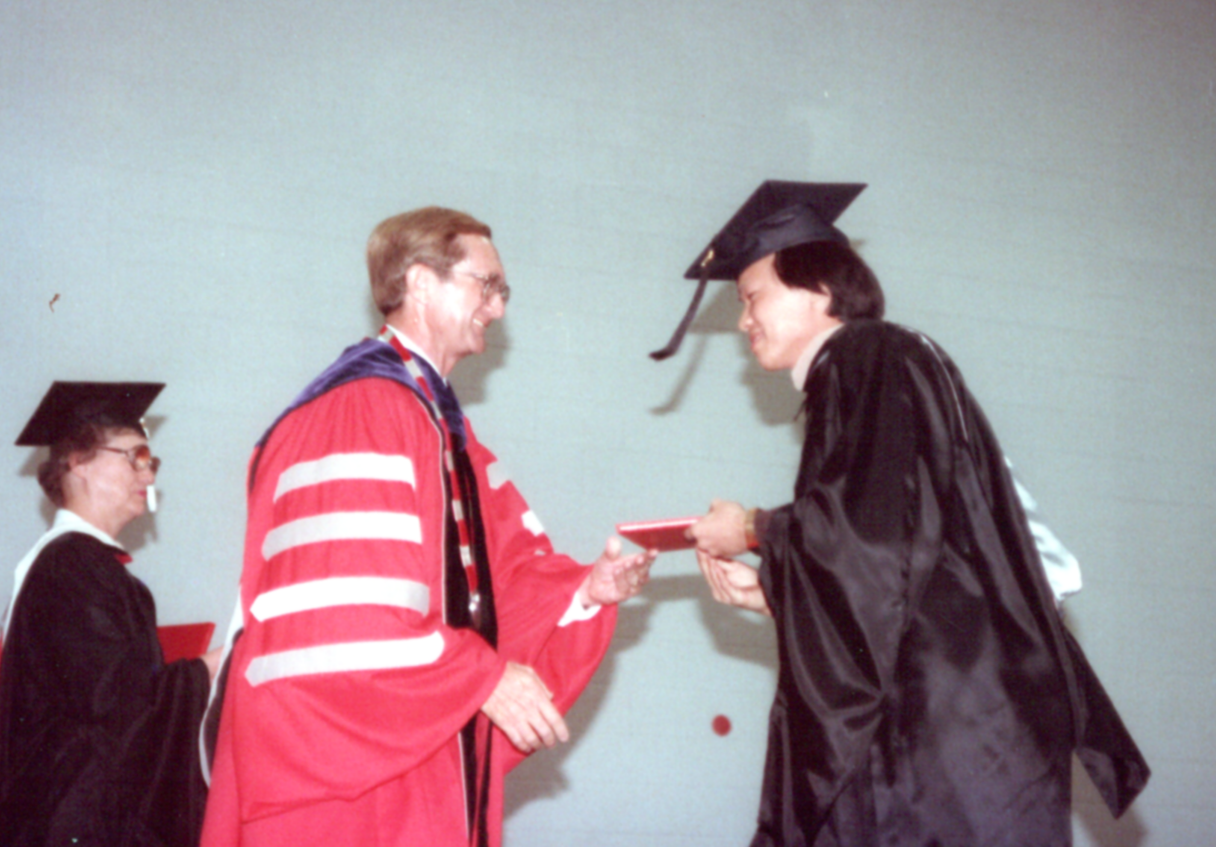
Lim at Graduation and Commencement Ceremony of Sul Ross State University in 1985.

== Top Glove and honorary degrees ==
In 1991, Lim founded Top Glove with a factory and glove production line.

In 2015, he obtained his PhD in Management from the University of Selangor in Malaysia, and was conferred an Honorary Doctorate in Business Administration by Oklahoma City University in 2016. In August 2018, Lim was also conferred an Honorary Doctorate in Entrepreneurship by Management & Science University, Shah Alam, Malaysia. In October 2020, Lim was conferred an Honorary Doctor of Philosophy (PhD) Degree in Business Management by University of Cyberjaya and appointed as an Honorary Professor of the university. In December 2021, Lim was conferred an Honorary Doctorate in Management by University of Cyberjaya for his contribution to the development of the nation's economy.

In 2020, Lim was appointed as an Honorary Professor at the University of Cyberjaya. His significant contribution to the development of the country’s economy earned him the University’s Honorary Doctorate in Management.

== Involvement in associations ==
Lim was the chairman and a non-independent non-executive director of Tropicana Corporation Berhad. He is the president emeritus in 2019/2020 and council member since 2010 of the Federation of Malaysian Manufacturers and Life Honorary Advisor of the Federation of Chinese Associations Malaysia since 2011.

He was the President of the Federation of Malaysian Manufacturers (FMM) in 2016/17. Lim served as the Director and Board Member of the Employees Provident Fund (Malaysia) from 2015 to 2020. He also served as a Director and Board Member of University of Malaya from 2015 to 2018.

== Honours and awards ==
=== Honours of Malaysia ===
- Malaysia
  - Commander of the Order of Loyalty to the Crown of Malaysia (PSM, 2 June 2007) : Tan Sri
- Pahang
  - Grand Knight of the Order of Sultan Ahmad Shah of Pahang (SSAP, 3 February 2006) : Dato' Sri

=== Awards ===
- In 2004, Lim was awarded Master and Country Entrepreneur of Malaysia for the Year by Ernst and Young.
- In December 2016, Lim was awarded FMM Icon Award 2016 by the Federation of Malaysian Manufacturers (FMM).
- In 2019, Lim was awarded Lifetime Achievement Awards by Entrepreneur Insight at the 100 Most Influential Young Entrepreneurs Award 2019.
- In 2020, Lim was awarded Most People Focused CEO (Silver) in HR Excellence Awards 2020.
- In 2022, Lim was awarded Corporate Eminence category presented by King of Malaysia in Hokkien Associations' Federation Dinner.
- In 2024, Lim received the Alumni Philanthropy Award (Anugerah Alumni Kedermawanan) at the “Public Universities Alumni Night 2024” [Majlis Malam Alumni Universiti Awam 2024].
- In 2025, he received the “Malaysian Fujian Exemplary Leader/Outstanding Awards”.

== Philanthropy and charity ==
Lim is a commissioner and volunteer of Tzu Chi Foundation. Lim was encouraged to volunteer by his wife.

In 2023, Lim donated RM2 million to his alma mater, the University of Malaya, to upgrade the Faculty of Medicine’s facilities and to establish a medical museum. “The Medical Museum Tan Sri Dr Lim Wee Chai” was completed in 2025 and is open to the public.

In 2026, Lim donated RM1 million, matched by RM1 million from the University of Cyberjaya, to jointly establish a permanent endowment the “Tan Sri Dr. Lim Wee Chai Visiting Professorship in Lifestyle Medicine” to support long-term academic development, research advancement, and societal impact in the field of Lifestyle Medicine.

In 2026, Lim donated RM1 million to the University of Malaya to establish the “Tan Sri Dr Lim Wee Chai Scholarship for Medicine and Wellness”, strengthening the university’s efforts in education, research, and medical heritage.
