= University of Malaya-Wales =

Private university in Malaysia

Universiti Malaya-Wales
- Universiti Malaya-Wales
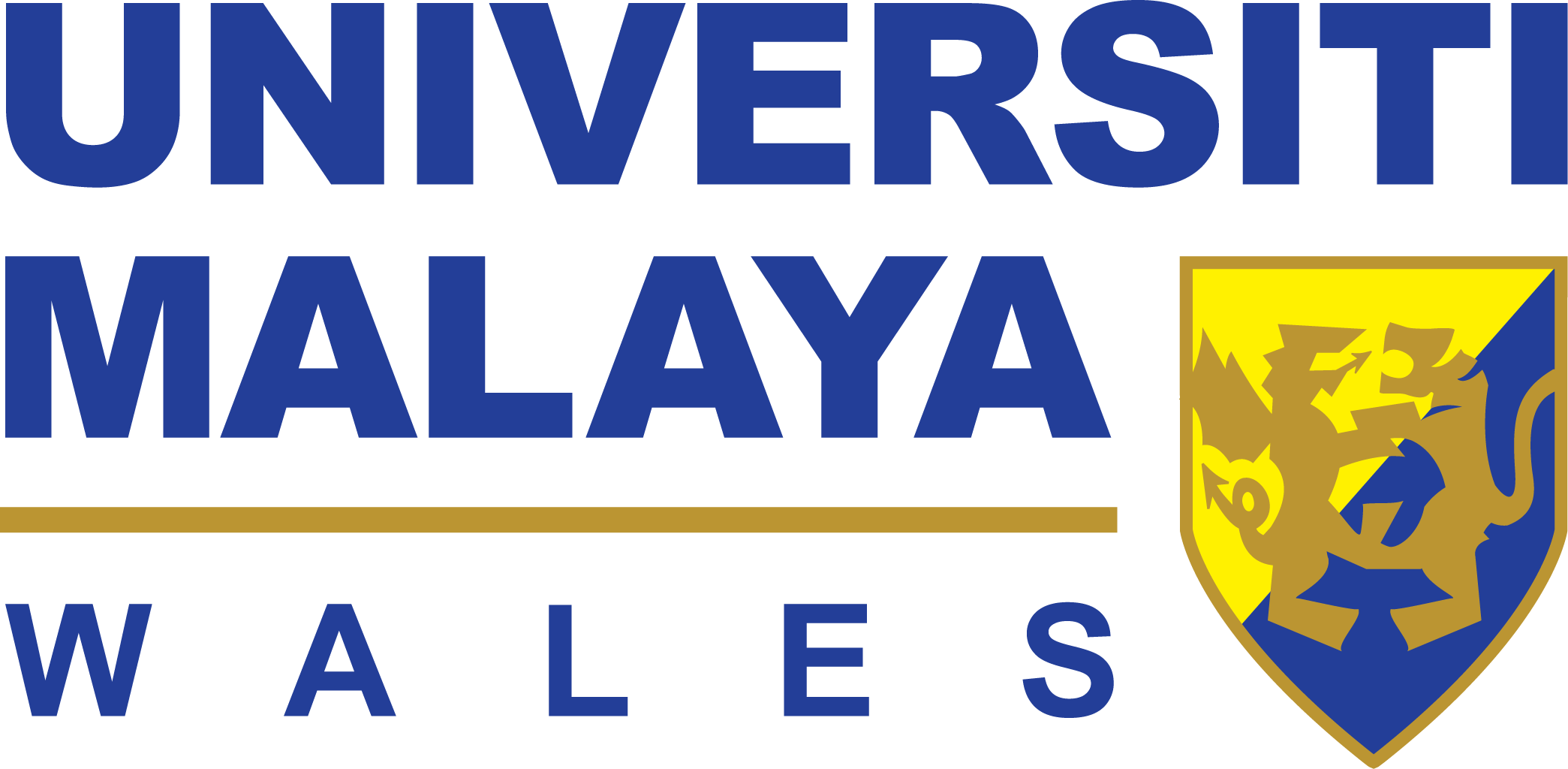
- Former name: International University of Malaya-Wales (IUMW)
- Type: Private
- Established: 11 March 2013
- Affiliations: Universiti Malaya, University of Wales Trinity Saint David
- Vice-Chancellor: Professor Dr Roselina Ahmad Saufi
- Location: Kuala Lumpur, Malaysia; 3°09′36.778″N 101°41′30.022″E
- Colours: Antique Gold Canary Yellow Royal Blue
- Website: www.umwales.edu.my

Universiti Malaya-Wales (abbreviated as UM-Wales; Malay: Universiti Malaya-Wales, Welsh: Prifysgol Malaya-Cymru) is a private university based in Kuala Lumpur, Malaysia. It was founded in 2013 known as the International University of Malaya-Wales (IUMW) and is a partnership between Universiti Malaya (UM) and the University of Wales Trinity Saint David, UK. It was renamed to Universiti Malaya-Wales on 7 March 2024.

UM-Wales offers both undergraduate and postgraduate programmes, and solicits both local Malaysian and international students. UM-Wales students are able to opt for Dual Award programmes of study whereby graduates of such dual programmes receive a degree from both UM-Wales and the University of Wales Trinity Saint David (UWTSD).

UM-Wales students are given the opportunity to participate in a student exchange programme which give them the opportunity to study at UWTSD. UM-Wales students also have access to the Universiti Malaya main campus facilities and library resources at no cost.

The UM-Wales campus is located on a land leased from Central Bank of Malaysia (BNM) that it acquired in 2017.

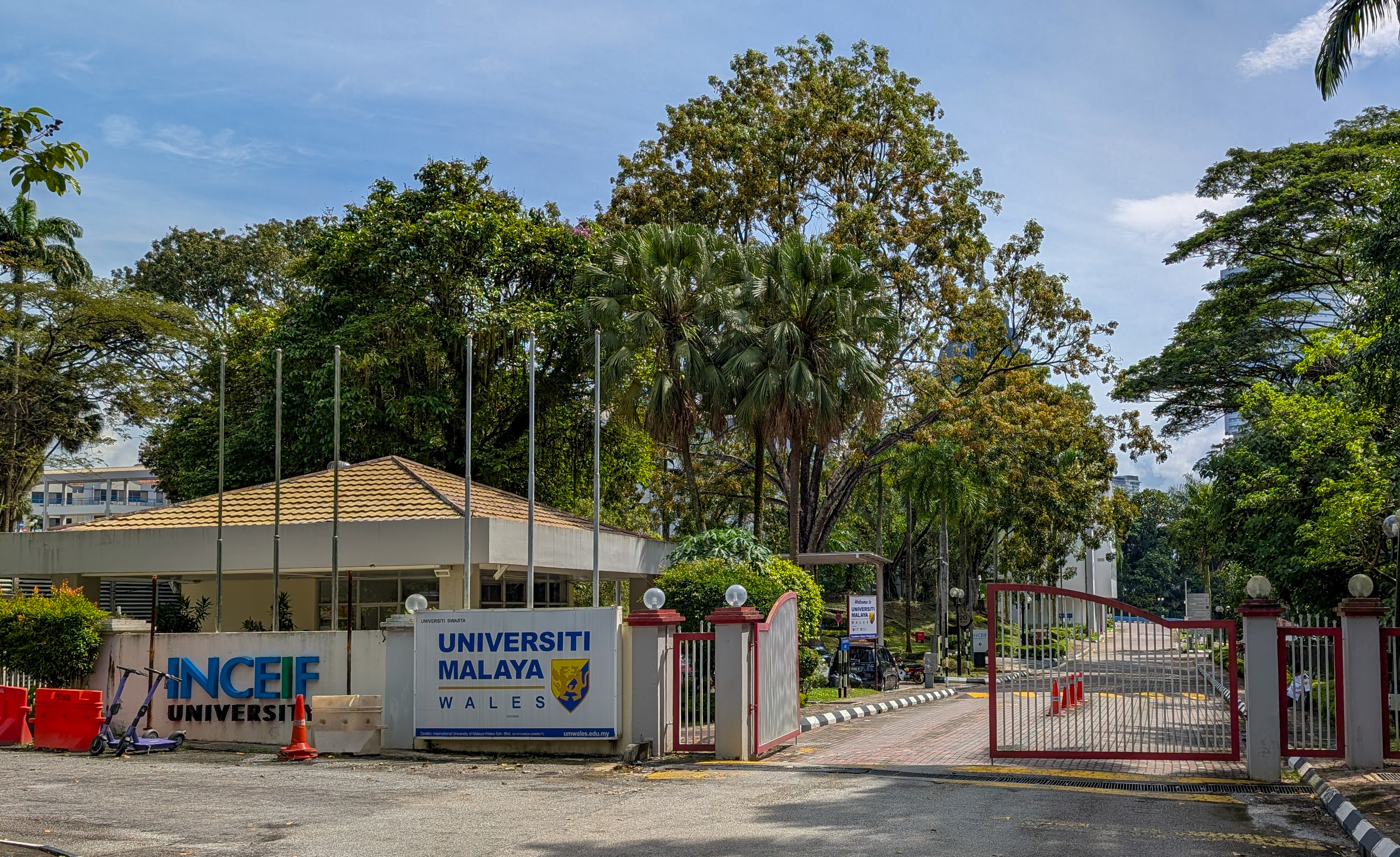
UM-Wales entrance

== Academic Faculties and Centres ==
There are four academic faculties and one centre under Universiti Malaya-Wales:

- Faculty of Business
- Faculty of Sustainable Communication
- Faculty of Artificial Intelligence
- Faculty of Humanistic and Allied Science
- Centre of Foundation, Language and Malaysian Studiesand

== Academic Programmes ==
The Faculty of Business offers bachelor's degrees in Entrepreneurship, Human Resource Management, International Business (available in conventional & Open and Distance Learning), Marketing, Accounting, Digital Business and Real Estate Management and Auction; Master of Business Administration (available in conventional & Open and Distance Learning); Master of Science Project Management; Doctor of Business Administration; Doctor of Philosophy in Business, and Doctor of Philosophy in Project Management.

The Faculty of Sustainable Communication offers bachelor's degree in professional communication. Master of Arts in Professional Communication (available in conventional & Open and Distance Learning), and Doctor of Philosophy in Professional Communication.

The Faculty of Artificial Intelligence offers Bachelor's in Information Technology, Computer Science, and Applied Artificial Intelligence. Doctor of Philosophy in Computer Science.

Faculty of Humanistic and Allied Science offers a Bachelor's degree in psychology.

The Centre of Foundation, Language and Malaysian Studies offers a Foundation in Science and a Foundation in Arts programmes.

UM-Wales’ Dual Award programmes are Bachelor's degrees in Professional Communication, Psychology, Entrepreneurship, Finance, Human Resource Management, International Business, and Marketing. When students graduate, they will receive certification from both UM-Wales and UWTSD.
