= Chin Fung Kee =

Malaysian civil engineer

Tan Sri Prof. Chin Fung Kee (Chinese: 陳宏基; pinyin: Chén Hóngjī; 1923– 29 August 1990) was a Malaysian civil engineer in engineering practice, as well as engineering research and education. He is known for his excellence in geotechnical, structural and hydraulic engineering. He was a local pioneer engineer who played a key role in the development of engineering education, research and practice in the country. His knowledge and contributions benefited the engineering fraternity both nationally and internationally and his achievements were recognized worldwide.

== Biography ==
Chin was born into a goldsmith family of Mr. Chin Siew Woon and Madam Chang Nyuk Khim in 1923, China.

Chin completed his secondary education at the High School, Bukit Mertajam and was awarded a Straits Settlements Scholarship to study at Raffles College, Singapore where he obtained a First Class Diploma in Arts. He then taught in his old school until he won a Queen's Scholarship in 1949 to study Civil Engineering at the Queen's University Belfast, UK. In Belfast he won the Foundation Scholarship in Civil Engineering and the Belfast Association of Engineers Prize. In 1952, Chin graduated with First Class Honours in Engineering and proceeded to complete his master's degree at the same university while working as an assistant lecturer.

Chin died on 29 August 1990 after a short illness. He is survived by his wife, Madam Wong Swee Yong (died 10 November 2010), a daughter, Madam Kathleen Chin Kie Fong and three sons, Dr. Alan Chin Kie Loong, Dr. Ian Chin Kie Cheng and Peter Chin Kie Siew.

== Academic career ==
Chin returned to Malaya in 1954 and served as an engineer with the Drainage and Irrigation Department before joining the University of Malaya in 1956 as lecturer and went on to senior lecturer and finally professor. He was acting Vice Chancellor for seven years and for a period he was simultaneously the professor and Dean of engineering, deputy and acting Vice Chancellor.

== Career ==
He retired as professor emeritus in 1973 and joined Jurutera Konsultant (SEA) Sdn. Bhd. He was responsible for the design and construction supervision of many highways, bridges, high-rise buildings, reclamations and structures on soft ground.

Chin played a major role in the formation and development of the Faculty of Engineering, University of Malaya. In 1957 after independence, the Government decided to set up the University of Malaya in Kuala Lumpur. Together with other teaching staff, he volunteered to approach the then Prime Minister, Tunku Abdul Rahman, to get his support to set up a Faculty of Engineering in Pantai Valley.

With the approval of the Tunku and an allocation of RM1.5 million only for the project, the team led by Chin went full swing to build the Faculty of Engineering at Pantai Valley. Within a period of only four months the engineering buildings were completed and equipment were moved from Singapore to Pantai Valley in Kuala Lumpur to enable the first session in engineering to continue in May 1958 without a break. For many nights, he had to sleep in his car to supervise the 24-hour work program.

When he was the acting Vice Chancellor, Chin was the de facto project director in the planning, design and construction of many buildings in University of Malaya, including the international award-winning Faculty of Medicine, University of Malaya building.

During the early years of his tenure with the Faculty of Engineering Chin worked closely under the founding professor and Dean, C.A.M. Gray. Their great achievement, attained through the collective efforts of both staff and students, was to produce the first batch of five graduates in 1958 and to build up in a short period of a few years, a degree which achieved international recognition. A pass degree in engineering from the University of Malaya then was readily accepted by British universities for postgraduate studies which normally required a good honours degree.

After the retirement of Professor Gray, Chin took over the leadership of the Faculty. As Dean and acting Vice Chancellor he expanded and further developed the Faculty of Engineering into a reputable engineering school recognized internationally. Since the early days in the 1950s, many thousands of well educated and highly trained engineers have graduated from the University of Malaya to serve mainly in Malaysia and Singapore. Many of them have been, and some still are, holding key positions in the Government and private sectors in both countries. Many have also done well in postgraduate studies in leading universities overseas.

Chin was an outstanding engineer in geotechnical, structural and hydraulic engineering and is remembered for his leading role in the design and construction of the first Penang Bridge, the KOMTAR building foundation rectification work in Penang and many other important projects such as the North-South Expressway.

Chin was very deeply involved in the planning, design and construction supervision of the Penang Bridge. He introduced innovative design features, in particular, special natural rubber bridge bearings were designed for the project to take care of seismic loading. This has given rise to a new industry and market for the use of Malaysian natural rubber. The bridge bearings were later further developed into special foundation bearings (base isolators) and used in seismic design of earthquake resisting buildings and bridges worldwide.

In the field of foundations, in 1970 he developed the concept of inverse slope method for the prediction of pile ultimate bearing capacity, without having to test the pile to failure. This method, which can save both cost and time during construction, is now internationally known and acknowledged as the 'Chin Method' in the piling industry. Arising out of his involvement as an independent consultant in the Komtar building foundation problem in 1977, Chin developed a method of diagnosing pile condition in the ground. This method has been widely used by practising engineers.

Chin devoted much of his time and efforts to carrying out research in respect of the needs and the problems faced by the country. He published more than technical and research papers and a book entitled: "The Penang Bridge - Planning, Design and Construction". The book which gives a first-hand account of all the important aspects of the bridge is a treasure to our national engineering heritage. The Institution of Engineers, Malaysia published a book entitled "Selected Papers of Professor Chin Fung Kee" for ease of reference and the benefit of the practising engineers. His many findings have found extensive application not only in development projects in Malaysia but also overseas.

In 1984 he was conferred the Doctor of Science degree by his alma mater, Queen's University of Belfast, based on his independent research over the years during his working life. He was also awarded Honorary Doctor of Science degrees by his alma mater, the University of Singapore, and the University of Glasgow.

Throughout his professional career, Chin was dedicated to public service. He served as an honorary consultant to the Malaysian Government on numerous engineering problems and projects. He was a member of several commissions and committees set up by the Malaysian Government to administer, study and investigate various matters pertaining to engineering.

He was chairman of the governing Council of the National Institute for Scientific and Industrial Research of Malaysia; Member of three Royal Commissions; Member of the National UNESCO Commission, Malaysia and Member of the Coordinating Advisory Committee, Malaysia Rubber Research and Development Board. In 1988, the National Council of Scientific Research and Development Malaysia awarded him the National Science Award.

In recognition of his contributions he was conferred the Johan Mangku Negara in 1967, the Panglima Setia Mahkota (which carries the title of Tan Sri) in 1980, and the Darjah Yang Mulia Pangkuan Negeri Pulau Pinang (which carries the title of Datuk) in 1985.

His successes earned him widespread reputation and recognition. He was an Honorary Fellow of both the Institution of Civil Engineers, UK and the Institution of Engineers, Malaysia of which he was a founder Council Member in 1959 and the President from 1966 to 1968. He was also President of the Southeast Asian Geotechnical Society from 1973 to 1975. He was elected the Vice President for Asia of the prestigious worldwide organization known as the International Society for Soil Mechanics and Foundation Engineering in 1981–1985. He was also elected Chairman of the Commonwealth Engineer's Council in 1973–1977.

Chin played a leading role in the Penang Bridge Project. His humility is exemplified by the following passage in his book entitled: "The Penang Bridge - Planning, Design and Construction":

"Engineers who actually engineer are not soloists at heart. A coveted product of engineering, be it a spacecraft or a major bridge, is the tangible result of a colossal amount of teamwork extending over many years. The Penang Bridge Project which was bestowed the Grand Award by the Council of Consulting Engineers of Washington in the 1986 US Engineering Excellence Competition is certainly the product of the dedicated effort of a large number of engineers from the Malaysian Highway Authority and many other government departments, from the consulting engineers Howard Needles Tammen & Bergendoff Int Inc, Jurutera Konsultant (SEA) Sdn Bhd and their Associates and from the Contractors Hyundai Engineering and Construction Co Ltd and their local joint venture construction companies. Consequently, the writer of this book is but only the scribe who has documented, hopefully with accuracy the results of the labour of the many engineers concerned."

== Legacy ==
In memory of Chin's achievements and contributions, several Lectures and Awards were named after him. The Southeast Asian Geotechnical Society established a Professor Chin Fung Kee Lecture to be delivered at every Society Conference held once every three years in Southeast Asia. In Malaysia, the annual Professor Chin Fung Kee Memorial Lecture was set up and funded by the Engineering Alumni Association of the University of Malaya in 1991. Each year this prestigious Lecture is organized jointly by this Association and the Institution of Engineers, Malaysia. Over the years this Lecture series has become an established tradition and each year the Lecture forms an important event in the annual calendar of the engineering profession.

His former students also provided funds for the annual 'Tan Sri Professor Chin Fung Kee Prize' awarded to the top student in the master's degree program in Geotechnical and Geo-environmental Engineering at the Asian Institute of Technology in Bangkok. The Tungku Abdul Rahman College established the annual 'Professor Chin Fung Kee Memorial Prize' for the best student in the Final Year Advanced Diploma in Technology (Building) Examination. The University of Malaya set up the Professor Chin Fung Kee Gold Medal Award which is given each year to the best engineering student in the final year examination.

On 7 November 2009, in honour of Chin's contribution to engineering development in Malaysia, the Institution of Engineers, Malaysia (IEM) named the auditorium in the new IEM building after Chin.

== Honours and awards ==
DSc (Belfast), FICE, FIStructE, FIE (Malaysia, Singapore, Ireland), MCIWEM, Hon. FICE, Hon. DSc (Belfast, Singapore and Glasgow), FWA, Tan Sri Datuk, JMN, PSM, DMPN

=== Honours of Malaysia ===
- Malaysia :
  - Companion of the Order of the Defender of the Realm (JMN) (1967)
  - Commander of the Order of Loyalty to the Crown of Malaysia (PSM) – Tan Sri (1980)
- Penang :
  - Companion of the Order of the Defender of State (DMPN) – Dato' (1985)
