= Rimba Ilmu Botanical Gardens =

- Entrance to Rimba Ilmu, University of Malaya
- Coordinates: 3°7′51.85″N 101°39′28.67″E
- Area: 80 hectares (0.80 km^{2})
- Established: 1974; 51 years ago
- Owned by: University of Malaya
- Administered by: Institute of Biological Sciences
- Website: rimba.um.edu.my

Logo of Rimba Ilmu Botanical Gardens

Rimba Ilmu (literally forest of knowledge) is a tropical botanical garden set up by the late Professor W.R. Stanton in 1974 on the campus of the University of Malaya in Kuala Lumpur, Malaysia.

The garden has over 1,600 species of plants occupying over 80 hectares. It is populated mainly with indigenous plants species but include many from tropical Asia, the Pacific islands, Australia, South America, Africa and Madagascar.
