= Top Glove =

Malaysian rubber glove company

Top Glove Corporation Bhd
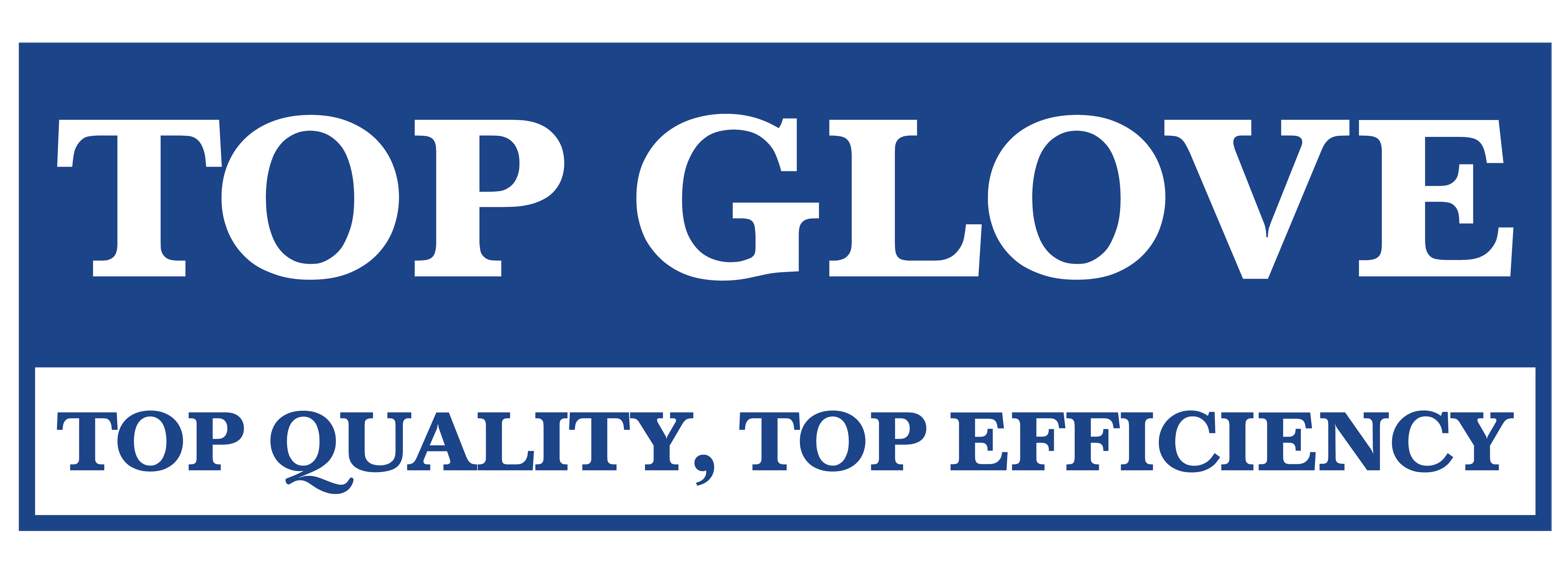
- Type: Public limited company
- Traded as: MYX: 7113 SGX: BVA
- ISIN: MYL7113OO003
- Industry: Rubber
- Founded: 1991
- Founder: Lim Wee-Chai
- Headquarters: Setia Alam, Malaysia
- Number of locations: 49 (as at August 2022)
- Key people: Tan Sri Dr Lim Wee Chai, Executive Chairman Lim Cheong Guan, Corporate Director Ng Yong Lin, Joint Managing Director Lim Jin Feng, Joint Managing Director
- Products: Rubber gloves
- Number of employees: 12,000
- Website: www.topglove.com

Top Glove Corporation Berhad is a Malaysian rubber glove manufacturer who also specialises in face masks, dental dams, and other products. The company owns and operates 50 manufacturing facilities in Malaysia, Thailand, China, and Vietnam. They also have marketing offices in these countries as well as the United States, Germany and Brazil.

== History ==
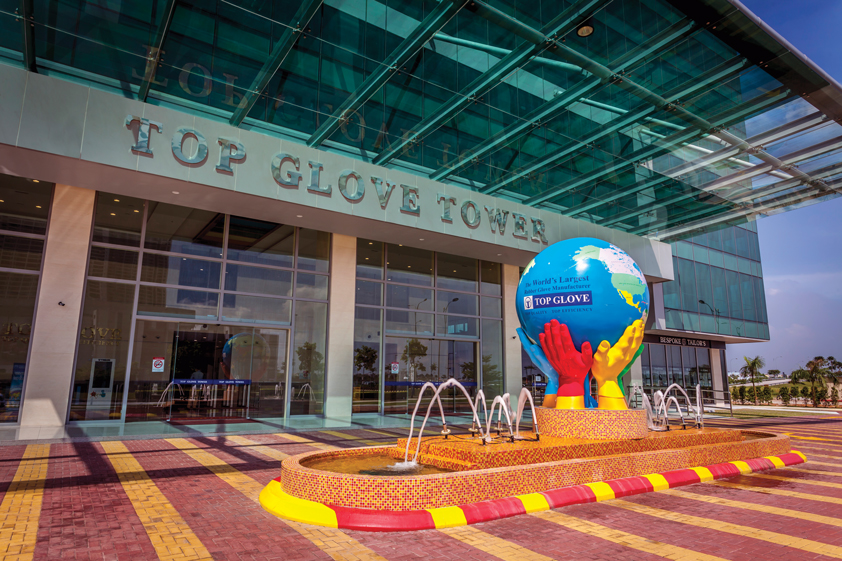
Entrance to Top Glove Tower

The company was founded in Malaysia in 1991 by Tan Sri Dr Lim Wee Chai, with one production line and staff comprising 100 people. Wee Chai's parents are rubber plantation owners and traders. Top Glove has since become the world's rubber glove largest manufacturer.

Top Glove was listed on the Kuala Lumpur Stock Exchange (now) or Bursa Malaysia in August 2001. In the span of a year, Top Glove Corporation Bhd's listing was promoted from the Second Board to the Main Board on May 16, 2002.

On 28 June 2016, Top Glove was also listed at number 9 on the Main Board of the Singapore Exchange.

In 2017, Top Glove announced that they would launch a new condom business in 2018 with a RM30 million (US$7 million) investment.

As at 28 February 2022, Top Glove had a shareholder fund of RM6.95 billion and for 2QFY2022 the Group achieved Sales Revenue of RM1.45 billion.

As of November 2021, Top Glove has 812 production lines, 50 factories, 195 countries of export and 2,000 customers.

In April 2018, Top Glove concluded its acquisition of leading surgical glovemaker, Aspion Sdn Bhd, its biggest M&A to date, which would see Top Glove emerging as the world's largest surgical glove manufacturer.

In April 2020, the company announced that it would manufacture face masks due to the COVID-19 pandemic. Due to rising demand for protective gear in response to COVID-19, Top Glove's profits had risen by 400% by mid-December 2020, with the company announcing a 20-times increase in quarterly net profit to RM 2.4 billion (US$590 million).

== Corporate identity ==
=== Headquarters and major facilities ===
Top Glove launched its new headquarters Top Glove Tower on 1 October 2015, located in Setia Alam, Shah Alam. It was officiated by Sultan of Selangor Sultan Sharafuddin Idris Shah. Top Glove has a total of 50 factories across Malaysia, Thailand, China and Vietnam. Out of the 37 glove factories, 32 are located in Malaysia, three in Thailand, and one each in China and Vietnam.

== Philanthropy ==
Throughout 2020, Malaysia will experience slower adverse demand due to the negative impact of the COVID-19 pandemic. Top Glove claimed that it would offer a total of 9,000 job opportunities for locals throughout 2021, to help address the rising unemployment rate in Malaysia. In a statement, Top Glove stated that it "hopes to achieve the target through a year-long recruitment campaign".

In July 2020, Top Glove contributed three million gloves worth RM700,000 as well as medical equipment such as ventilators and medical suits worth RM300,000 to the Ministry of Health Malaysia (MOH). This initiative was facilitated by the Tan Sri Muhyiddin Charity Golf (TSMCG) Foundation which helped to disseminate these supplies to the hospitals and health departments identified by the MOH for the use of frontline professionals.

In November 2020, the company donated a total of RM185 million to the government's COVID-19 fund set up to battle the pandemic.

== Controversies ==
=== Labour controversies ===
In December 2018, The Guardian reported that migrant workers were allegedly being subjected to forced labour, forced overtime, debt bondage, withheld wages and passport confiscation. The company has denied these allegations and claimed that it has since improved its labour initiatives, which include the introduction of a zero cost recruitment policy.

An investigation by Channel 4 News in June 2020 found that staff were living in cramped conditions, paid £1.08 an hour, forced to work overtime to meet the demand for gloves during the COVID-19 pandemic, and could not adequately practice social distancing despite the company claiming appropriate measures were taken. Workers, many of whom were migrants, also claimed they paid up to $5,000 in recruitment fees to secure employment, leaving them in debt bondage. Top Glove did not address any specific claims but called the investigation inaccurate.

In July 2020, Top Glove engaged United Kingdom-based ethical trade consultancy Impactt Limited to assess the presence of forced labour by reference to the International Labor Organization's 11 Forced Labour Indicators, propose corrective action plans to improve the Group's labour practices, and monitor the Group's implementation of the corrective action plans.

In April 2021, Impactt verified that the company has eliminated all indicators of systemic forced labour in its direct operations. This includes repayment of recruitment fees totaling USD $36 million to current and eligible former workers via monthly payments which were concluded in April 2021.

=== US CBP Withhold Release Order (WRO) and revision ===
On 15 July 2020, the U.S. Customs and Border Protection (CBP) placed a Withhold Release Order (WRO) on imports of products made by subsidiaries of Top Glove for labour issues over debt bondage of its foreign workers and poor housing. In response, Top Glove pledged to improve housing for their workers and remove the debt bondage of its workers in an effort to lift the ban.

On 13 May 2021, the US Customs and Border Protection seized a shipment of 4.68 million Top Glove latex gloves in the Port of Kansas City, Missouri on the grounds that they had been manufactured using forced labour. This shipment was worth RM 2.8 million (US$690,000) and was bound for Kansas City.

On 9 September 2021, the US Customs and Border Protection (CBP) announced that it has uplifted and modified the forced labour findings on Top Glove Corporation Bhd, and that the CBP will permit the importation of disposable gloves made at Top Glove facilities in Malaysia to US effective immediately. The CBP cited Top Glove as an example of a company that did take proactive steps to engage with it to remediate the WRO or Finding.

=== COVID-19 pandemic ===
In mid-November 2020, several COVID-19 cases were detected in one of the Top Glove dormitories in Klang which has led to an enhanced movement control order being implemented in the surrounding area. By 27 November 2020, more than 4,000 cases were linked to the Top Glove dormitory cluster. On 30 November, the EMCO at Top Glove's dormitories across Malaysia was extended until 14 December. The company were required to temporarily close a total of 28 factories in stages in the area.

According to a Malay Mail report published on 13 December 2020, several South Asian migrant workers had told the Agence France-Press about "appalling" living conditions including cramped dormitories housing 25 people. These overcrowded conditions had contributed to the spread of COVID-19 within 28 of Top Glove's 41 factories. In response to criticism and publicity, Top Glove announced plans to purchase more workers' accommodation and to build "mega-hostels" equipped with modern amenities that can house 7,300 people. The same day, it was reported that Top Glove had fired a whistleblowing Nepalese migrant worker named Yubaraj Khadka for sharing photos of overcrowded working conditions, which were later picked up by Reuters.

In a radio interview with BFM89.9 on 23 December 2020, Top Glove's Managing Director, Dato’ Lee Kim Meow said the company had established 3 helplines for aggrieved workers, one internal and two staffed by personnel from a consultant firm and an audit firm. Top Glove announced that it would no longer penalise whistleblowers and would establish three helplines for workers’ complaints.

In April 2021, during a media walkabout of Top Glove's workers’ accommodations in Klang and Setia Taipan, the company announced it would be investing up to a total of RM300 million to provide conducive workers' accommodation that comply to the Workers' Minimum Standards of Housing and Amenities Act 1990 (Act 446). Glove manufacturer Top Glove Corp Bhd is working with Independent workers rights specialist, Andy Hall, as it takes measures to improve working and living conditions at its factories.
