= Faculty of Medicine, University of Malaya =

Medical school in Malaysia

Faculty of Medicine, Universiti Malaya
- Fakulti Perubatan, Universiti Malaya (Malay)
- Former names: King Edward VII College of Medicine
- Type: Public; Research university Medical school
- Established: 28 September 1905 (King Edward VII College of Medicine), September 1962 (Faculty of Medicine, University of Malaya)
- Parent institution: Universiti Malaya
- Dean: Professor Dato' Dr. Yang Faridah Abdul Aziz
- Location: Kuala Lumpur, Lembah Pantai, Malaysia; 3°07′15″N 101°39′23″E
- Language: English
- Website: medicine.um.edu.my

The Faculty of Medicine, Universiti Malaya (commonly known as the UM Medical School, FoM UM, UM Medicine, or Malaya Medicine) is one of the thirteen faculties of the Universiti Malaya (UM). It was officially established in September 1962 after the establishment of the university's Kuala Lumpur campus. This was the first medical school established in Malaysia.

The faculty is well-known for its medical education and research, especially in the discovery of the Nipah virus (1998–1999 Malaysia Nipah virus outbreak). The faculty is widely regarded as the top medical school in Malaysia, being placed at No. 145 in the world in the subject of medicine in the QS World University Subject Rankings 2021, making it the highest-ranked medical school in Malaysia and the third-highest in Southeast Asia.

== History ==
The Faculty of Medicine was established in Singapore as the Straits Settlements and the Federated Malay States Government Medical School in 1905, which trained physicians from present-day Singapore and Malaysia. It was located within a former women's mental asylum at Sepoy Lines. The start of this medical school was significant in two ways. It trained local people to bring Western medicine to the population, and it was supported by merchants who took advantage of the tax exemptions to give generously to public causes. One notable donor was Tan Jiak Kim, a prominent Straits-born Chinese merchant. Another, Tan Chay Hoon, donated a building to the school in memory of his father, Tan Teck Guan. The Tan Teck Guan Building was built in 1911.

In 1921, the school was renamed the King Edward VII College of Medicine (KECM) after a donation from the Edward VII Memorial Fund. Founded by Lim Boon Keng in 1926, the College of Medicine Building was built to house the college in addition to the Tan Teck Guan Building. The dental school was founded shortly after.

During World War II, the college operated during the Japanese occupation of Singapore, but some people were killed. The first casualty was a fourth-year medical student based at Tan Tock Seng Hospital who was fatally wounded during the Battle of Singapore. While his friends were burying him, they were spotted by Japanese soldiers, and eleven were killed on the spot. The dead are commemorated by the SGH War Memorial.

In 1949, the KECM merged with Raffles College to form the Singapore campus of UM. The medical school became the Faculty of Medicine of UM, and students in Malaysia wishing to study medicine would have to go to the campus in Singapore. In 1962, UM split into UM (Kuala Lumpur) and the University of Singapore, with the medical school in Singapore coming under the University of Singapore, while the UM in Kuala Lumpur established the present faculty. The founder dean of the faculty was Tan Sri Emeritus Prof. Dr. Thamboo John Danaraj. On 5 May 2005, T.J. Danaraj Medical Library was named in memory of the dean.

=== Silent Mentor ===
In affiliation with Taiwan's Tzu Chi University, the faculty launched the first silent mentor program outside of Taiwan in 2012. The program serves as a platform for the public to pledge and donate their bodies for medical education and research. The donors are addressed as "silent mentors," as they teach and educate medical students and professionals despite not speaking any words. After the week-long training workshop, the bodies of the "Silent Mentors" will be returned to the family members to be cremated. The program is largely different from the traditional cadaveric teaching in medical schools around the globe, as most cadavers are unidentified bodies. However, in this "Silent Mentor" program, the students are exposed to the life stories of each of the "Silent Mentors," and this is done to allow students to learn medicine with a humanistic approach.

== Teaching hospitals ==
- Universiti Malaya Medical Centre (UMMC)
  - The 1,617-bed UMMC is the first and largest teaching hospital as well as the second largest hospital in Malaysia. It serves as the primary teaching hospital for FoM and is one of the main tertiary hospitals in the Klang Valley, receiving over a million outpatients every year. It also serves as a referral center for hospitals throughout the region.
- Tengku Ampuan Rahimah Hospital, Klang

== Academic profile ==
Year	Rank	Valuer
2018	301–400	Times Higher Education World University Rankings
2018	151–200	QS World University Rankings
2019	251–300	Times Higher Education World University Rankings
2019	101–150	QS World University Rankings
2020	176–200	Times Higher Education World University Rankings
2020	101–150	QS World University Rankings
2021	176–200	Times Higher Education World University Rankings
2021	145	QS World University Rankings

== Education ==
=== Undergraduate ===
- Bachelor of Biomedical Science (Honours), (BBiomedSc) (Hons.)
- Bachelor of Medicine and Bachelor of Surgery (MBBS)
- Bachelor of Nursing Science (Honours), (BNSc) (Hons.)

=== Postgraduate ===
==== Clinical Master's Degree ====
- Master of Anaesthesiology (MAnaes)
- Master of Clinical Oncology (MCO)
- Master of Emergency Medicine (MEmMed)
- Master of Family Medicine (MFamMed)
- Master of Internal Medicine (MIntMed)
- Master of Obstetrics & Gynaecology (MObGyn)
- Master of Ophthalmology (MOphthal)
- Master of Orthopaedic Surgery (MOrthSurg)
- Master of Otorhinolaryngology-Head & Neck Surgery (MSur ORL-HNS)
- Master of Paediatrics (MPaeds)
- Master of Paediatrics Surgery (MPaedSurg)
- Master of Pathology (MPath) in various specializations such as Haematology, Chemical Pathology, Forensic Pathology, Medical Microbiology, and Anatomic Pathology
- Master of Psychological Medicine (MPM)
- Master of Radiology (MRad)
- Master of Rehabilitation Medicine (MRehabMed)
- Master of Sports Medicine (MSpMed)
- Master of Surgery (MSurg)
- Master of Neurosurgery

These programs provide extensive clinical training and are part of the National Postgraduate Medical Curriculum (NPMC) project initiated by the Faculty.

==== Programme by Coursework ====
- Master of Medical Physics (MMedPhysics)
- Master of Nursing Science (MNSc)
- Master of Public Health (MPH)
- Master of Medical Education (MMedEd)
- Master of Health Research Ethics (MOHRE)
- Master of Medical Parasitology and Entomology
- Master of Epidemiology (MEpi)

The Faculty is notable for offering Malaysia's only programs in two niche areas: the Master of Medical Physics and the Master of Medical Science in Regenerative Medicine (MMedSc(RegMed)).

==== Programme by Mix Mode ====
- Doctor of Public Health (DrPH)
- Master of Medical Science (Regenerative Medicine) (MMedSc(RegMed))

==== Programme by Research ====
- Doctor of Philosophy (PhD)
- Doctor of Medicine (MD)
- Master of Medical Science (MMedSc)

=== Elective Postings ===
==== Clinical Elective Postings ====
- Medicine
- Obstetrics & Gynaecology
- Oncology
- Ophthalmology
- Orthopaedic Surgery
- Otorhinolaryngology
- Paediatrics
- Pathology
- Primary Care
- Psychological Medicine
- Surgery
- Trauma & Emergency

Some clinical postings may only be available during certain times of the year.

==== Research Elective Postings ====
Available research departments include:

- Anatomy
- Medical Microbiology
- Molecular Medicine
- Parasitology
- Pharmacology
- Physiology
- Social & Preventive Medicine

The elective placements are available for varying durations:

Clinical elective: Minimum of 2 weeks in one clinical discipline.

Research elective: Options range from 2-4 weeks, 6-8 weeks, or 9-12 weeks, depending on the nature of the research.

== Accreditation ==
- Malaysian Qualification Agency (MQA)
- Malaysian Medical Council (MMC)
- Malaysian Allied Health Profession Council (MAHPC)
- Malaysian Nursing Board (LJM)

== Publications ==
=== Journals ===
1. Journal of University of Malaya Medical Centre (JUMMEC)
2. Biomedical Imaging and Intervention Journal (BIIJ)

== Organisations ==
1. Universiti Malaya Medical Society (UM MedSoc)
  - The UM MedSoc has its roots to the Medical Society (Medsoc) that was first formed in 1949 at the University of Malaya in Singapore, headed by Mr. Goon Sek Mun. Subsequently after the separation of Singapore from Malaysia, the present-day Faculty of Medicine was set up in the Kuala Lumpur campus of Universiti Malaya and a separate Medical Society was set up. It remains as the oldest medical student organisation and society in the medical fraternity in Malaysia. Till this date, the UM MedSoc has frequently collaborated with the Yong Loo Lin School of Medicine's Medical Society to organise events for its members across Malaysia and Singapore, namely the MUNUS Games and most recently, MUUINUS in 2020, which was an online e-gaming competition held between the two medical schools, with an addition of University of Indonesia.
2. Universiti Malaya Students' Union (UMSU) - Faculty of Medicine
3. Universiti Malaya Medical Alumni Association
4. Universiti Malaya Biomedical Science Society
5. Universiti Malaya Nursing Science Society

== Notable alumni ==
=== Straits Settlements and Federated Malay States Government Medical School (1905-1921) ===
- Abdul Latiff bin Abdul Razak (1919), the first Malay to be a qualified physician
- Chen Su Lan(1910), social reformer and anti-opium activist

=== King Edward VII College of Medicine (1925–49) ===
- Awang Hassan (1934) – fifth Yang di-Pertua Negeri of Penang
- Lim Han Hoe – Singaporean physician and politician
- Mahathir Mohamad (1953) – fourth and seventh Prime Minister of Malaysia
- Salma Ismail (1947) – first Malay woman to qualify as a physician
- Siti Hasmah Mohamad Ali – wife of Mahathir
- Benjamin Sheares (LMS, 1929) – second President of Singapore
- Tan Chee Khoon (1949) – Malaysian politician known as "Mr. Opposition", co-founder of Parti Gerakan Rakyat Malaysia

=== Faculty of Medicine, Universiti Malaya (1962–present) ===
- Awang Bulgiba Awang Mahmud is First Malaysian doctor to gain a PhD in Health Informatics
- Chua Soi Lek former Minister of Health
- Lee Boon Chye former Deputy Minister of Health
- V. S. Rajan, Singaporean dermatologist, venereologist, medical superintendent, and professor

== Notable academics ==
- Lam Sai Kit (Virology)
- Awang Bulgiba Awang Mahmud (Public Health)
- Looi Lai Meng (Histopathology). Recipient of the Merdeka Award, Inaugural National Distinguished Professor awarded by the Ministry of Higher Education, Malaysia, Council Member of the Academy of Medicine of Malaysia
- Woo Yin Ling (Gynecologic Oncology). She established Program ROSE, which introduces a revolutionary approach to cervical cancer screening that improves accessibility of testing and follow-up for women everywhere
- Hany Binti Mohd Ariffin (Pediatric Oncology). Won the Anugerah Akademik Negara award in 2015, received the Distinguished Researcher Award from UM in 2018 and has been the Malaysian lead for the Malaysia-Singapore (MASPORE) Leukemia Study Group since 2003

== Deans of the Faculty ==
1. Tan Sri Emeritus Professor Thamboo John Danaraj (The Founder Dean) - February 1963 ~ March 1975
2. Professor Datuk Dr. Lau Kam Seng - March 1975 ~ May 1976
3. Professor Dato' Dr. Khairuddin Yusof - May 1976 ~ July 1977
4. Professor Datuk Dr. K Somasundaram July 1977 ~ 28 February 1981
5. Professor Dr. T.A. Sinnathuray 1 March 1981 ~ 13 May 1985
6. Professor Dato' Dr. Khairuddin Yusof - 13 May 1985 ~ 15 April 1986
7. Professor Dr. Anuar Zaini Mohd. Zain - 16 April 1986 ~ 31 March 1990
8. Professor Dr. Jason Teoh Soon Teong - 1 April 1990 ~ 31 March 1992
9. Professor Dato' Dr. Anuar Zaini Mohd Zain - 1 April 1992 ~ 31 March 2000
10. Tan Sri Professor Dr. Mohd Amin Jalaludin - 1 April 2000 ~ 31 July 2006
11. Professor Dato' Dr. Ikram Shah Ismail - 1 August 2006 ~ 1 July 2011
12. Professor Dato' Dr. Adeeba Kamarulzaman - 1 July 2011 ~ 2 December 2020
13. Professor Dr. April Camilla Roslani - 3 December 2020 ~ 31 March 2024
14. Professor Dato' Dr. Yang Faridah Abdul Aziz - 1 April 2024 ~ present

== Achievements ==
- The Merdeka Award: Nipah Virus Encephalitis Investigation Team from the Faculty of Medicine, Universiti Malaya
- In 2020, Subashan Vadibeler, a final year (Stage 3.3) medical student from the Faculty of Medicine, was awarded the Rhodes Scholarship. He was the 7th Malaysian to receive this prestigious scholarship. He was also the first student from a Malaysian university to receive this honour (the previous 6 Malaysians who at the time were awarded the scholarship were studying in universities overseas).

== See also ==
- Universiti Malaya
- Universiti Malaya Medical Centre
- National University of Singapore
- Yong Loo Lin School of Medicine
