= NUS Yong Loo Lin School of Medicine =

Medical school of the National University of Singapore

- 杨潞龄医学院
- Former names: Straits Settlements and Federated Malay States Government Medical School (1905–1921); King Edward VII College of Medicine (1929–1949); Faculty of Medicine, University of Malaya (1949–1962); Faculty of Medicine, NUS (1962–2005)
- Type: Public
- Established: 1905; 121 years ago
- Parent institution: National University of Singapore
- Dean: Chong Yap Seng
- Location: Kent Ridge, Singapore; 1.2963°N 103.7796°E
- Website: medicine.nus.edu.sg

The NUS Yong Loo Lin School of Medicine (branded as NUS Medicine) is the medical school of the National University of Singapore.

== History ==
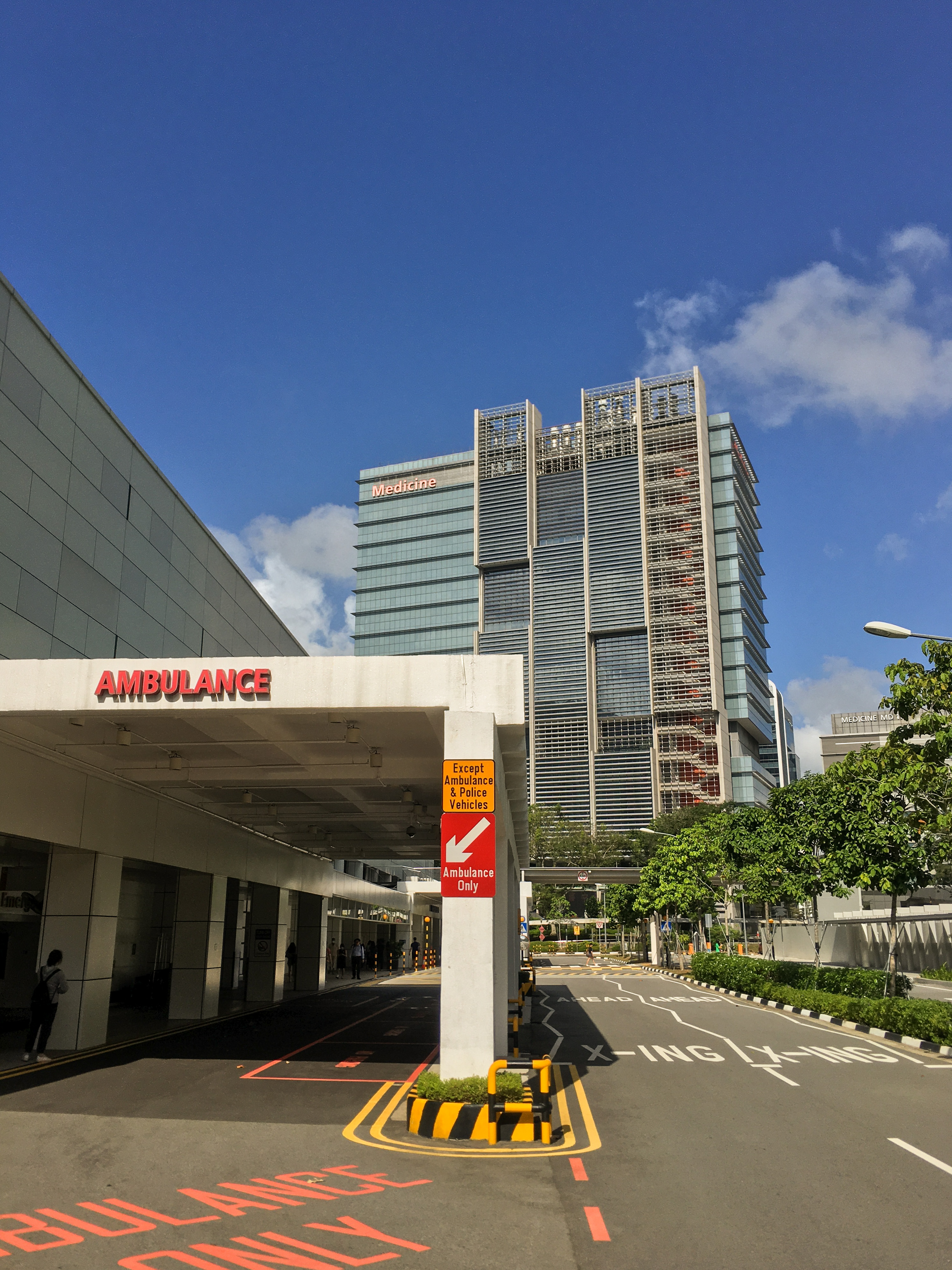
The Centre for Translational Medicine (MD6) building

The Yong Loo Lin School of Medicine was first established as the Straits Settlements and Federated Malay States Government Medical School in 1905 to train physicians from the British colonies of present-day Singapore and Malaysia. It was located within a former women's mental asylum at Sepoy Lines. The start of this medical school was significant in two ways. It was meant to train local men and women to bring Western medicine to the local population. It was handsomely supported by local merchants who took advantage of the tax exemptions of the time not to garner more wealth, but to give generously to public causes. Tan Jiak Kim gave the largest individual sum. Another donor, Tan Chay Hoon donated a building to the school in memory of his father, Tan Teck Guan. The Tan Teck Guan Building was built in 1911.

In 1921, the school was renamed the King Edward VII College of Medicine after receiving a donation from the Edward VII Memorial Fund founded by Lim Boon Keng. In 1926, the College of Medicine Building was built to house the college in addition to the Tan Teck Guan Building. The dental school was founded soon after.

During World War II, the college continued operating even with the Japanese occupation of Singapore, but not without consequences. The first casualty was a fourth-year medical student based at Tan Tock Seng Hospital who was fatally wounded by Japanese shells during the Battle of Singapore. While his friends were burying him, they were spotted by Japanese soldiers and eleven were killed on the spot. The dead are commemorated by the SGH War Memorial.

In 1949, the KECM then merged with Raffles College, which specialized in the humanities and teacher training, to form the Singapore campus of the University of Malaya (UM). The medical school became the Faculty of Medicine of UM, and students in Malaysia wishing to study medicine would go to the campus in Singapore. UM eventually split into UM (Kuala Lumpur) and the University of Singapore in 1962, with the medical school coming under the University of Singapore while and UM in Kuala Lumpur established the Faculty of Medicine, University of Malaya.

Through a series of mergers with other universities, the University of Singapore would eventually form the National University of Singapore (NUS). The medical school became the Faculty of Medicine within the university and in 1982, it left its old buildings at Sepoy Lines behind to move into its new campus at Kent Ridge. The historic College of Medicine and Tan Teck Guan buildings which it previously occupied are currently owned by the Ministry of Health and listed as national monuments by the National Heritage Board.

In 2005, the centenary of the medical school and also that of the university, the medical school was renamed the Yong Loo Lin School of Medicine in honour of philanthropist and doctor Yong Loo Lin following a SG$100 million endowment from the Yong Loo Lin Trust. The gift enabled the medical school to expand its infrastructure and facilities.

== Departments ==
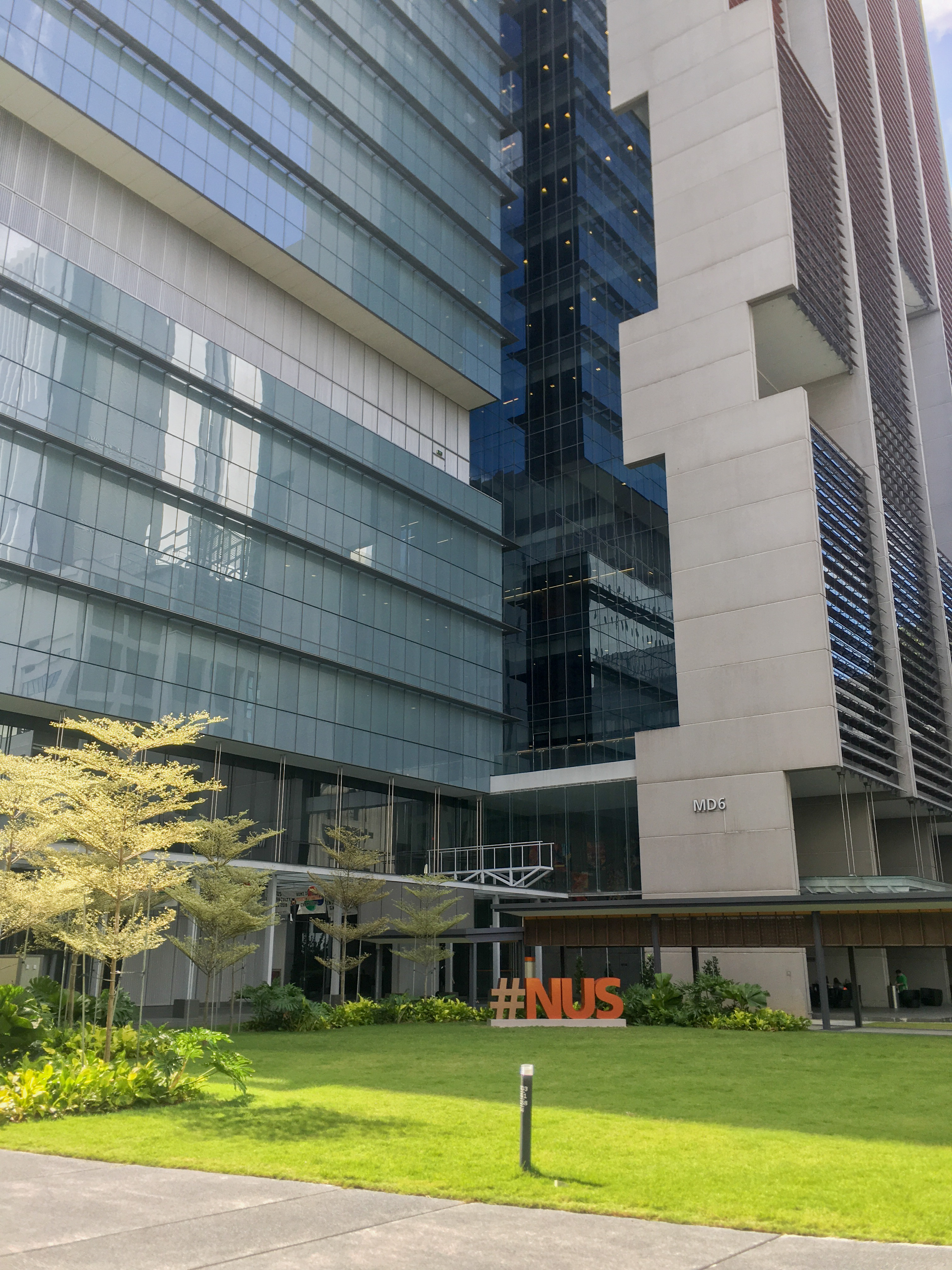
NUS Yong Loo Lin School of Medicine

The School comprises 18 departments and 2 centres such as the Alice Lee Centre for Nursing Studies, Anaesthesia, Anatomy, Biochemistry, Diagnostic Radiology, Medicine, Microbiology, Obstetrics & Gynaecology, Ophthalmology, Orthopaedic Surgery, Otolaryngology, Paediatrics, Pathology, Pharmacology, Physiology, Psychological Medicine, and Surgery.

== Admission and Programmes ==
The School uses the British undergraduate medical system, offering a full-time 5 year undergraduate programme leading to the Bachelor of Medicine and Bachelor of Surgery (MBBS). For Nursing, the Bachelor of Science (Nursing) (conducted by the Alice Lee Centre for Nursing Studies) is offered.

== Rankings ==
As of December 2022, NUS is ranked:

- 17th worldwide (3rd in Asia-Pacific after Tsinghua University at 7th and University of Melbourne at 14th) in the Times Higher Education World University Rankings 2022 by subject: clinical and health.
- 21st worldwide (3rd in Asia-Pacific after University of Sydney at 18th and University of Melbourne at 20th) in the QS World University Rankings by Subject 2022: Medicine.
- 46th worldwide (joint 3rd in Asia-Pacific after University of Sydney at 20th and University of Melbourne at 33rd) in the USNEWS Best Global Universities for Clinical Medicine.

== Notable alumni ==
=== Politics ===
- Ng Eng Hen – Minister for Defence
- Vivian Balakrishnan – Minister for Foreign Affairs
- Benjamin Sheares – 2nd President of Singapore
- Lam Pin Min – former Senior Minister of State for Health, and Transport
- Balaji Sadasivan – former Senior Minister of State for Foreign Affairs
- Tan Cheng Bock – former Member of Parliament for Ayer Rajah, and 2011 presidential election candidate
- Lim Han Hoe, Singaporean physician and politician
- Mahathir Mohamad – 4th and 7th Prime Minister of Malaysia
- Siti Hasmah – former Spouse of the prime minister of Malaysia as the wife of Mahathir
- Awang Hassan – 5th Yang di-Pertua Negeri of Penang
- Tan Chee Khoon – co-founder of Parti Gerakan Rakyat Malaysia
- Ling Liong Sik – former Minister of Transport of Malaysia
- Chen Su Lan, social reformer and anti-opium activist

=== Academia ===
- Tan Chorh Chuan – 2nd President of the National University of Singapore
- Mak Joon Wah, Malaysian pathologist
- Jannie Chan, Singaporean entrepreneur, and former lecturer in physiology and pharmacology
- Ong Teck Chin – former Principal of Anglo-Chinese School (Independent) (1994-2010)
- Lim Pin, former Vice-Chancellor of the National University of Singapore
- Shan Ratnam, physician specialising in contraception – former Professor of Obstetrics and Gynaecology
- Paola Ricciardi-Castagnoli, Italian immunologist – Scientific Director of the Singapore Immunology Network
- James Whyte Black, Scottish pharmacologist, Nobel Laureate, formerly senior lecturer at King Edward VII College.

=== Medical ===
- Robert Tan, physician
- Woffles Wu, Singaporean plastic surgeon
- Tan Sri Dr Salma Ismail (1947), first Malay woman to qualify as a physician
- Abdul Latiff bin Abdul Razak, the first Malay to be a qualified physician
- Charles Joseph Pemberton-Paglar – founder of Paglar Maternity and Nursing Home (now Parkway East Hospital)
- Roy Yorke Calne, British surgeon
- Kanagaratnam Shanmugaratnam, pathologist and founder of the Singapore Cancer Registry, former Master of the Academy of Medicine, Singapore

=== Sports ===
- Mok Ying Ren, Singaporean athlete and SEA Games gold medalist
- Wong Meng Kong (1987), Singaporean chess grandmaster

== See also ==
- National University Hospital
- Duke–NUS Medical School
- Lee Kong Chian School of Medicine
- National University of Singapore
- Faculty of Medicine, University of Malaya
- University of Malaya
