= Roger Foo =

Singaporean cardiologist

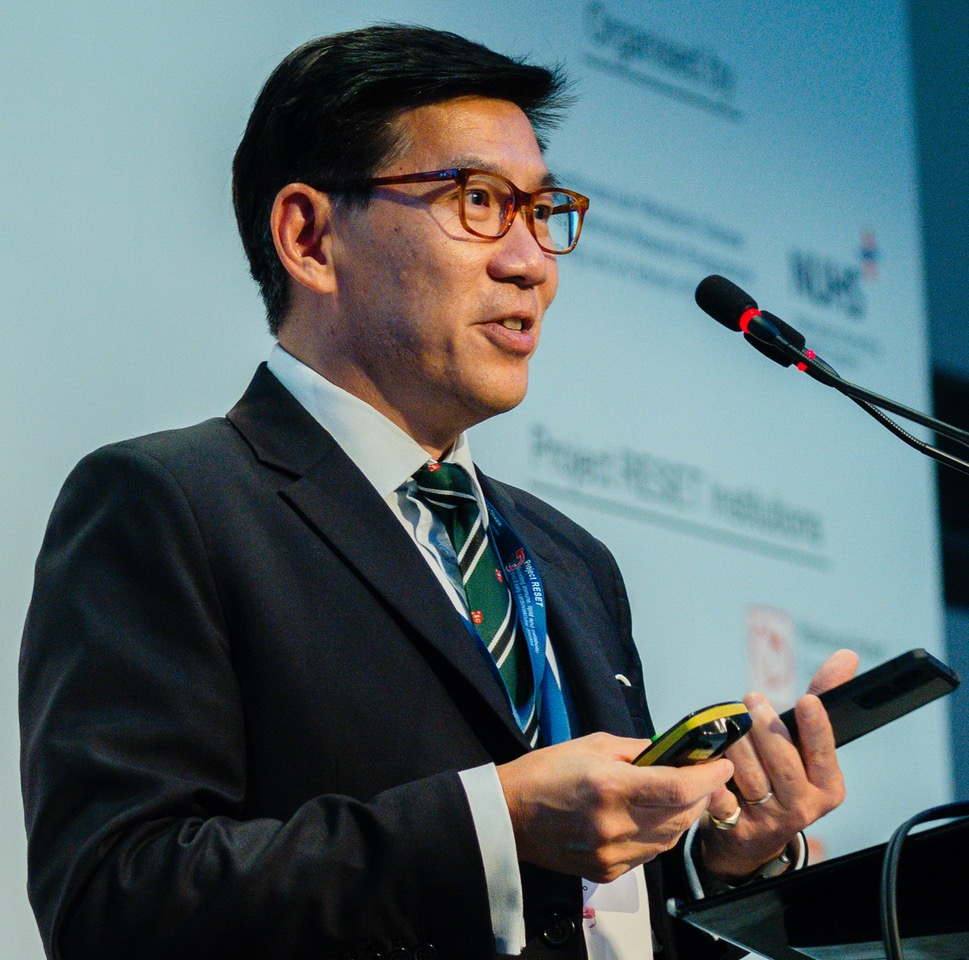
- Scientific career
- Fields: Cardiology
- Workplaces: Yong Loo Lin School of Medicine

Roger Foo is a Singaporean cardiologist. He is the inaugural chair holder of the Zayed bin Sultan Al Nahyan Professorship of Medicine at the National University of Singapore (NUS) Yong Loo Lin School of Medicine, where he is also Vice Dean (Research) and previously Founding Head of the Clinician Scientist Academy. He was also previously Director of the Cardiovascular Disease Translational Research Programme, but now still holds the post of Director of the Cardiovascular Research Institute (CVRI), Senior Consultant in the National University Heart Centre. He is also currently an Adjunct Research Director at the A*STAR Institute of Molecular and Cell Biology (IMCB).

== Research work ==
Foo started the inherited cardiac conditions (ICC) clinical service at the National University Hospital in 2013.

Foo's lab was the first to publish an epigenomic map of the failing human heart in 2011. In 2017, his lab published an in-depth analysis of the cardiac chromatin 3D organisation and delineated detailed maps of cardiac enhancer-promoter interactions, enhancer genetics, and also through cardiomyocyte single nuclear sequencing reported the discovery of a long noncoding RNA, called Singheart, which regulates key cardiac gene expression. Foo has also published on the application of Next Generation Sequencing genomics to patients in the clinic, and in 2022 was involved in the first phase of the SG10K genomics project in Singapore.

Foo chairs the Ministry of Health Clinician Scientist Research Residency Panel, and is the President of the Singapore College of Clinician Scientist, Academy of Medicine since 2025.
