= North Devon Crematorium =

Coordinates: 51°03′55″N 4°04′41″W

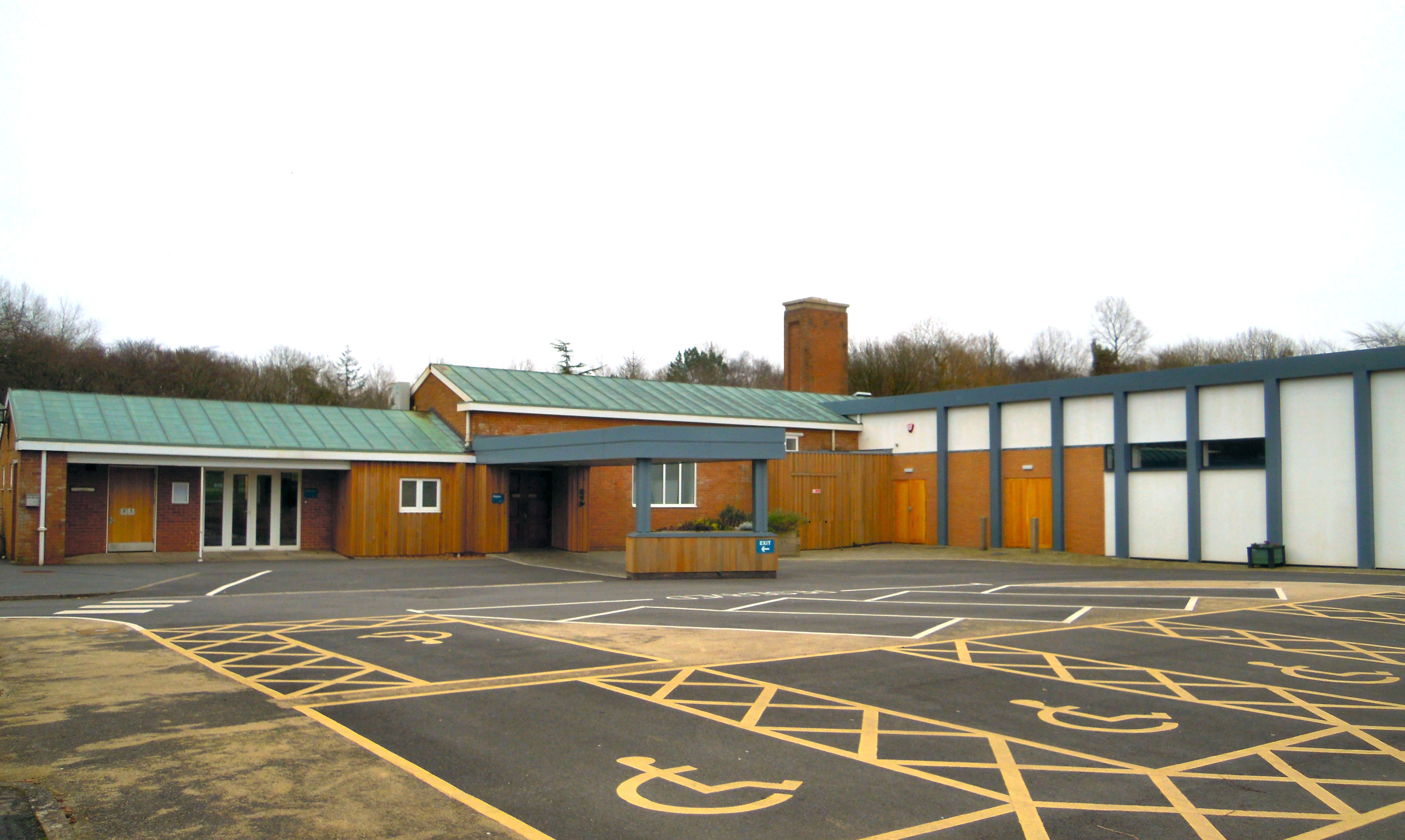
North Devon Crematorium - Aspen chapel left and Rowan right

The North Devon Crematorium (also known as Barnstaple Crematorium) is located on Old Torrington Road in Barnstaple and is the only crematorium in North Devon. It is operated by North Devon Council and has the largest crematorium chapel in England, Wales and Northern Ireland.

== History and facilities ==
North Devon Crematorium was built in 1966 for the Joint Committee of North Devon and Torridge District Councils. The original chapel, Aspen, was the last crematoria designed by Harold R W Orr; it was built by Y J Lovell (Western) Limited. There is a separate Chapel of Memory and the Garden of Rest is laid out over three levels. Aspen can seat 72 mourners and underwent modernisation during 2018 to include digitally downloaded music, video tribute facilities, password protected webcasting and recording while at the same time retaining the organ for more traditional funerals.

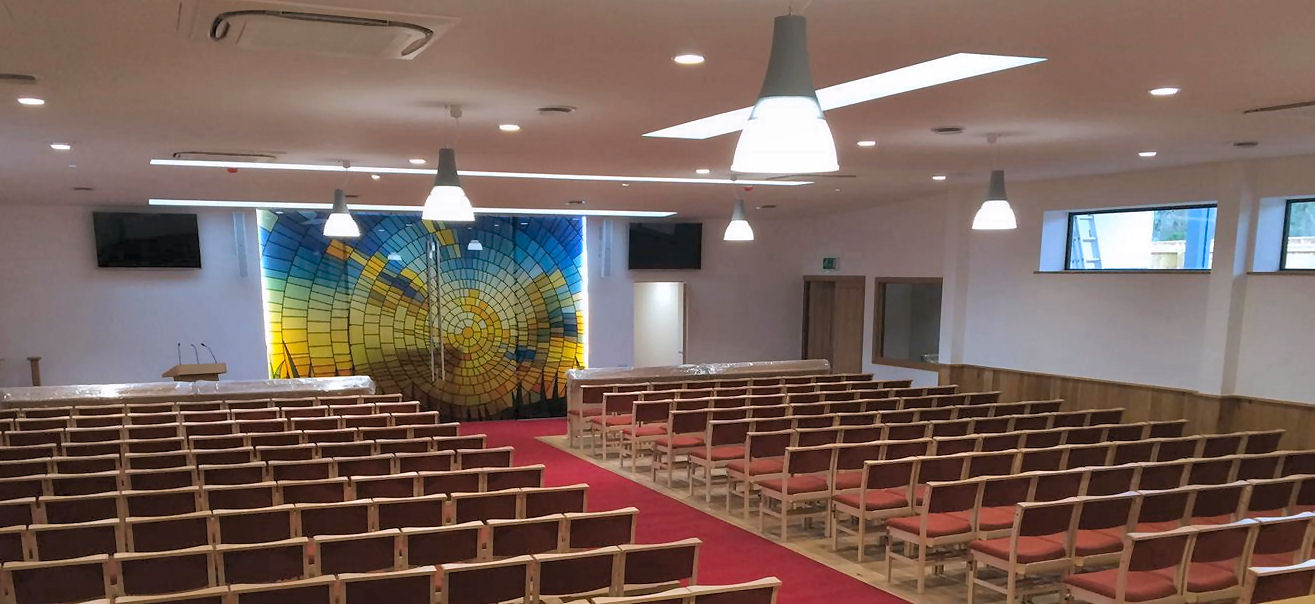
The interior of Rowan chapel

The newer chapel is Rowan which was completed in 2016 at a cost of £1.14 million and which is currently the largest crematorium chapel in England, Wales and Northern Ireland. It was dedicated in 2016 by Robert Atwell, the Bishop of Exeter. Rowan has the capacity to hold large services with seating for over 250 mourners and a quiet viewing room. In addition the chapel has standing room for a large number of additional mourners and a large outdoor canopy to cover hundreds more in case of bad weather. Facilities available at Rowan include the ability to webcast services to anywhere in the world plus digitally downloaded music, video tributes and recording. All memorial services in Rowan are recorded so that if a mourner missed the service a recording can be obtained up to six weeks later.

North Devon Crematorium is located within landscaped memorial gardens where ashes can be interred and with a car park for 130 vehicles onsite. There is substantial on-street parking available just outside the crematorium. Services are booked for 40 minute slots with the ability to book a double slot. In 2013 North Devon Council stated that it would levy a fine of £147 for any service which went over the 40 minutes.

== Notable cremations ==
- Alfred William Frisby (1897-1973), British colonial administrator and educator

== Gallery ==
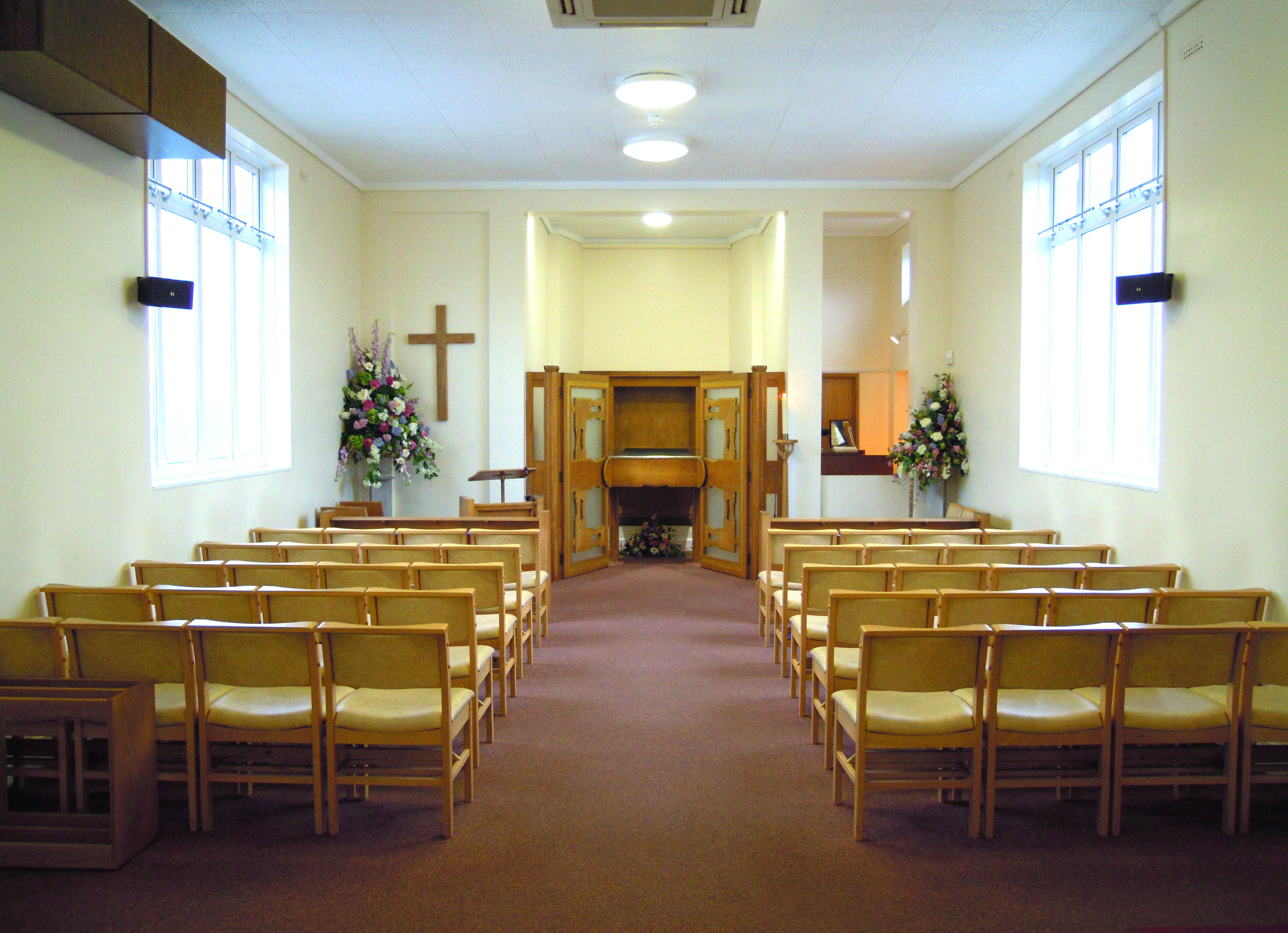
The interior of Aspen chapel

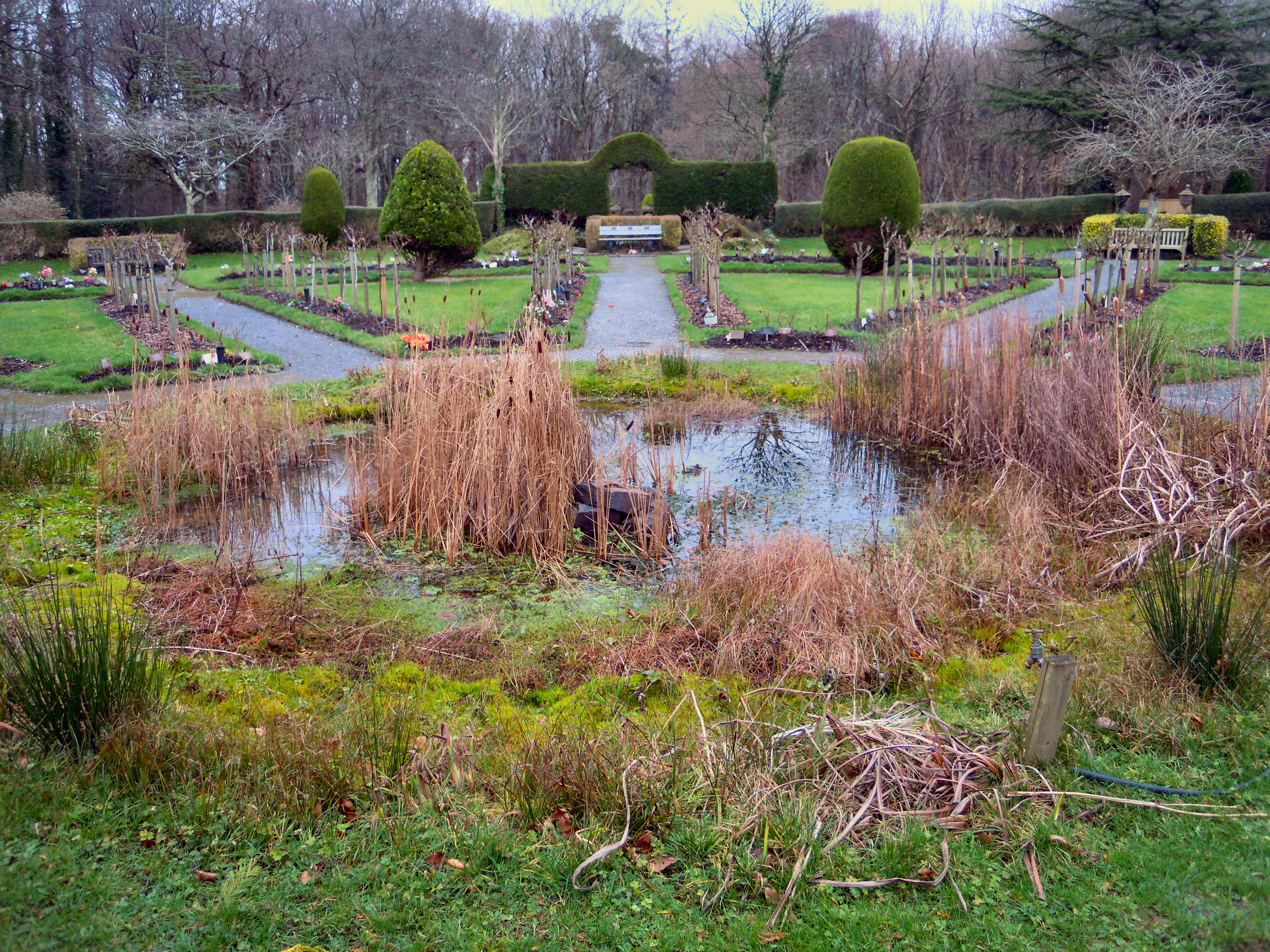
Section of the Garden of Remembrance
