= Awang Bulgiba Awang Mahmud =

Malaysian epidemiologist and physician

Yang Berbahagia Awang Bulgiba PGBK
- اوڠ بولڬيب اوڠ مهمود
- Born: Awang Bulgiba bin Awang Mahmud
- Known for: Studies and opinions on COVID-19 in Malaysia.
- Scientific career
- Fields: Epidemiologist
- Institutions: University of Malaya

Awang Bulgiba bin Awang Mahmud (Jawi: اوڠ بولڬيب بن اوڠ مهمود) is a Malaysian epidemiologist and physician based at the Faculty of Medicine, University of Malaya.

== Biography ==
Awang Bulgiba is the first Malaysian doctor to be awarded a Doctor of Philosophy (PhD) in Health Information. Awang Bulgiba is also the first to hold four educational fellowships at the UK Faculty of Public Health, Malaysian Public Health Medicine, the Malaysian Academy of Medicine and the Academy of Sciences. He also holds the position of Secretary-General of the Malaysian Academy of Sciences and President of the Asia-Pacific Public Health Consortium.

During the COVID-19 pandemic in Malaysia, Awang Bulgiba became known on 23 March 2020, by suggesting that the Movement Control Order (MCO) was the best step taken by the government in the fight against COVID-19. He recommended that Malaysia need a minimum of six weeks for the virus containment to work. On April 9, he also said that the MCO should be extended due to the low level of public understanding and compliance of Malaysia in the fight against COVID-19. On April 12, Awang Bulgiba also said that the MCO could be ended if the number of new cases continues to decline and the numbers of recovered exceeds those of new cases.

== Award ==
- Sarawak
  - Glorious Star Commander (PGBK) - Datuk (2017)
