= Khairuddin Mohamed Yusof =

Khairuddin bin Mohamed Yusof (born 30 July 1939 in Perak, Malaysia) is a Malaysian obstetrician and gynecologist. He is a professor emeritus at the University of Malaya. He received the Emeritus from the university in the year 2004 and Darjah Dato` Paduka Cura Simanja Kini (DPCM) which brings the title of "Dato’ Paduka" from Malaysia's state King of Perak in 1998.

== Career with University of Malaya ==
Khairuddin served the university for 25 years from 1972 to 1997. He began his career in the university as a lecturer and later was promoted to the dean for Faculty of Medicine in 1986. In the same year, he was elected as the deputy vice-chancellor (finance and development) until 1989 and on several occasions as the acting vice chancellor. He was the department head of obstetrics and gynecology at Malaysia University Hospital and also the professor of social obstetrics and gynecology at the time he retired.

== Education ==
Khairuddin graduated from Sydney University with Bachelor of Medicine and Surgery (MBBS) in 1964 and in 1972, was made a Member of the Royal College of Obstetricians and Gynaecologists.

== Contributions ==
Throughout his career, Khairuddin has written many published and unpublished journals and books related to academics, social lives and, women and children development and health. He has involved in many welfare and community services, among them is "Sang Kancil".

== Present ==
He is currently serving as the director of Telemedicine Malaysia (World Care Health, Malaysia), non-executive Director of a public listed company and has just retired from the position of an Academic Advisor in Perak Royal Medical College.

== Publications ==
Research publications with other lecturers and professors from University of Malaya

=== Books ===
- Khairuddin Yusof, Saroja Batumalai, Wong Yut Lin, & Jonathan Okamura, "The ABCs of Community Participation in Primary Health Care", Faculty of Medicine, University of Malaya, Kuala Lumpur, 1989.
- Khairuddin Yusof, WY Low, SN Zulkifli, & YL Wong (eds)," Issues and Challenges of Public Health in the 21st Century", Faculty of Medicine, University of Malaya Press, Kuala Lumpur. 1996.
- WY Low, SN Zulkifli, K Yusof, & YL Wong, "Dawn of a New Millennium: Future of Public Health Issues in Malaysia", 1996.

=== Journals ===
- Low W. Y., Ooi G. L & Yusof K, "Community-based use of IQ Test with Sang Kancil pre-school children", Malaysian Journal Reproductive Health 4(2) : 97 – 103, 1986.
- Zulkifli S. N., Low W. Y., Yusof K, "Measures towards better living conditions among the urban poor". In the Collection of papers presented at the Seminar on population and the quality of life in Malaysia, Population Studies Unit, Faculty of Economics, Kuala Lumpur, 1987.
- Low W. Y., Yusof K., "Aging and its problems." The Family Practitioner, 10(1), April 1987.
- Yusof K, Low W.Y, Ooi G.L, "Sang Kancil primary health care services. An evaluation of pre-school component". Jernal Pendidikan, 11(11) : 30-40,1987.
- Low W. Y, Yusof K, "Drug addiction – current trend", Malaysian Medical Journal, 43(1) : 34-39, 1988.
- Low W. Y., Zulkifli S. N. & Yusof K., "Adolescent sexuality in Kuala Lumpur city",In : Data Analysis For Sample Surveys (2). National Population And Family Development Board, Kuala Lumpur, 1988.
- Low Wah Yun & Khairuddin Yusof, "Child abuse and neglect." Proceedings of the Second Asian Regional Conference On Child Abuse and Neglect. Bangkok, Thailand, August 1988.
- Zulkifli S. N., Low W. Y. & Yusof K., "Urban living: A review of physical and social indicators". Ilmu Masyarakat (Malaysian Social Science Association Publication) Jan 1989 – Jun 1989, 14, 53-68, 1989.
- Low Wah Yun & Khairuddin Yusof "Reproductive Research Priorities To Meet National Needs. II. Sociological Research.", Proceeding Of The Workshop On The Formulation Of Strategies For Self-Reliance in Reproductive Research. National Population and Family Development Board, Malaysia, January 1989.
- Zulkifli S. N., Low W. Y. & Yusof K. "Interventions for better living conditions among the urban poor." Malaysian Society of Health Journal, 1989, 7 (1) : 37-43.
- Low Wah Yun, Siti Norazah Zulkifli & Khairuddin Yusof. "Adolescent sexuality in Kuala Lumpur city." Occasional Paper. Population Studies Unit. University Malaya, 1989.
- Low Wah Yun & Khairuddin Yusof, "Services for urban poor families in Kuala Lumpur, Malaysia : A case study". Child Welfare, LXX (2) : 293-302, 1991.
- W.Y. Low, S.N. Zulkifli & K. Yusof. "Knowledge and attitudes of Malaysian adolescents towards family planning", Singapore Journal of Obstetrics & Gynaecology, 25 (3) : 279-288 1994.
- K. Yusof, S.N. Zulkifli, S. Batumalai, K.W. Aye & W.Y. Low. Report on "Knowledge, Attitudes And Perceptions Related To Drug Abuse In Peninsula Malaysia With Additional Focus On Parents And Adolescents", Social Obstetrics & Gynaecology Unit, Faculty of Medicine, University of Malaya, April 1994.
- Zulkifli S.N., Yusof K., Low W.Y., "Maternal and child health in urban Sabah, Malaysia: A comparison of Citizens and migrants." Asia-Pacific Journal of Public Health, 1994 : 7(3): 151-8.
- Zulkifli S.N., W.Y. Low & Yusof K., "Sexual activities of Malaysian adolescents", Medical Journal of Malaysia, 50 (1) : 4-10, 1995.
- K. Yusof & W.Y. Low, "Health self-sustaining communities squatters". In : A. Awang, M. Salim & J. F. Halldane (eds.), Towards a Sustainable Urban Environment In Southeast Asia, Urban Habitat and Highrise Monograph SEACEUM 2, Johore : Institute Sultan Iskandar of Urban Habitat and Highrise, University Technology Malaysia, 1995.
- Khairuddin Yusof & Low Wah Yun, “Disaster Preparedness”. In the Proceedings of the First National Public Health Conference, Ministry of Health, Kuala Lumpur, 1995.
- Zulklifli S.N., Low W.Y. & Yusof K., "Public Health In Malaysia". In : Hurrelmann K. & Laaser U. (eds.). International Handbook on Public Health. Westport : Greenwood Press, 1996.
- W.Y. Low, S.N. Zulkifli, K. Yusof, S. Batumalai & W. A. Khin, "Knowledge, attitudes and perceptions related to drug abuse in Peninsula Malaysia: A survey report", Asia-Pacific Journal of Public Health, 8 (2) : 123-129, 1996.
- W.Y. Low & K. Yusof, "School health promotion for school-aged children in Malaysia". In : A. Shoebridge (ed.) Proceedings on the Conference on Health Promotion for School-aged Children In The Asia-Pacific Region, University of Sydney, New South Wales, Australia, May 1995.
- W.Y. Low, S.N. Zulkifli, K. Yusof, S. Batumalai & K.W. Aye, "The drug abuse problem in Peninsular Malaysia : Parent and teen differences in knowledge, attitudes and perceptions", Drug and Alcohol Dependence, 42 : 105-115, 1996
- W.Y. Low, S.N. Zulkifli, Y.L. Wong & K. Yusof, "Dawn Of A New Millennium : Future of Public Health Issues In Malaysia". In: K. Yusof, W.Y. Low, S.N. Zulkifli & Y.L. Wong (eds.) Issues And Challenges Of Public Health In The 21st Century. Kuala Lumpur : University of Malaya Press, 1996.
- K. Yusof & W.Y. Low, "Development, Environment and Health". In : Kwai Sim Low (ed.) Proceedings on Control of Water Pollution Caused by Mining Activities In Southeast Asia. Kota Kinabalu, Sabah, 25–26 October 1995. 1996.
- W.Y. Low., Y.L. Wong & K. Yusof, “Socio-medical aspects of transexualism in Kuala Lumpur”, Singapore Journal of Obstetrics and Gynaecology, 28 (2) : 64-69, 1997.
- S.N. Zulkifli, W.Y. Low & K. Yusof, "The role of schools of public health on maternal and child health programmes in the Asia-Pacific region", Asia-Pacific Journal of Public Health, 10 (1) : 10-16, 1998.
- Wah Yun Low, Siti Norazah Zulkifli and Khairuddin Yusof “Urban Health in Kuala Lumpur.” In : Rais Akhtar (ed.) Urban Health in The Third World. New Delhi : A.P.H. Publishing Corp.
- SN Zulkifli, MU Khin, K Yusof, & YL Wong, “Maternal and Child Health in Urban Sabah, Malaysia: A Comparison of Citizens and Migrants”, Asia-Pacific Journal of Public Health, Vol. 7, no. 3, 1994, pg. 151-158.
- WY Low, YL Wong, & K Yusof, “Socio-medical aspects of transsexualism in Kuala Lumpur”, Singapore Journal of Obstetrics and Gynaecology, Vol. 28, nos. 2-3, July–November 1997, pg 64-69.
