= College of Radiology, Academy of Medicine Malaysia =

- Abbreviation: CoR
- Formation: 1976
- Founder: Dr Hj Omar bin Din
- Type: NGO
- Legal status: Academic
- Region served: Malaysia
- Members: https://collegeofradiology.org/about-cor/join-the-cor/
- Official language: English, Malay
- President: Dr Farhana Fadzli
- Vice-President: Prof Dr Kartini Rahmat
- Honorary Secretary: Dr Shantini A. Arasaratnam
- Honorary Treasurer: Dr Amir Fuad Hussain
- Parent organization: Academy of Medicine of Malaysia
- Affiliations: https://collegeofradiology.org/myrad/about-myrad/
- Website: https://collegeofradiology.org/
- Formerly called: Malaysian Radiological Society

The College of Radiology, Academy of Medicine Malaysia is a non-profit organization of clinical radiologists, clinical oncologists, and medical physicists in Malaysia.

It was established as the Malaysian Radiological Society (MRS) following the inaugural general meeting held on November 27, 1976, at the then General Hospital, Kuala Lumpur. On August 23, 2001, the MRS became a chapter in the Academy of Medicine of Malaysia and from then on is known by its current name.

It has adopted Biomedical Imaging and Intervention Journal as its official publication.

== Founding ==
The establishment of a professional body for radiologists and radiotherapists in Malaysia was first proposed between 1971 and 1972 by Allahyarham Dato’ Dr Hj Omar bin Din. However, the proposal initially received limited support and did not progress significantly in its early stages.

In 1976, efforts to formalise the organisation gained momentum. Associate Professor Dr Joginder Singh, serving as pro-tem secretary, drafted a constitution for the proposed society. During this period, several names were considered, including Malaysian Society of Radiologists and Radiological Society of Malaysia. Dr Hussain Abd Ghani was appointed pro-tem chairman.

The inaugural general meeting of the society was held on 27 November 1976 at the General Hospital, Kuala Lumpur. A total of 13 radiologists and radiotherapists attended the meeting: Dr AH Ang, Dr NK Ghouse, Dr Hussain Abd Ghani, Dr Ismail Sa’ad, Dr Joginder Singh, Dr K Kulaveerasingam, Dr AK Mukherjee, Dr Narinder Singh, Dr K Ragupathy, Dr SK Dharmalingam, Dr Perdamen Singh, Dr V Mahadev, and Dr K Narashima.

At the meeting, the first office bearers were elected. Dr SK Dharmalingam was appointed president, with Dr Hussain Abd Ghani as vice-president, Dr Joginder Singh as secretary, and Dr Perdamen Singh as treasurer. The council members included Dr Ang Ah Hoo, Dr Ismail Sa’ad, and Dr NK Ghose.

Dato’ Dr Hj Omar bin Din, then the most senior radiologist in Malaysia, was unanimously elected as the first Honorary Life Member of the society under Article VII of its constitution. The name Malaysian Radiological Society was formally adopted, and an application for registration was submitted to the Registrar of Societies on 26 January 1977.

== Early Development ==
On 26 January 1977, the society formally adopted the name Malaysian Radiological Society (MRS) and submitted its application for registration to the Registrar of Societies. Dato’ Dr Hj Omar bin Din, then the most senior radiologist in Malaysia, was unanimously elected as the society’s first Honorary Life Member under Article VII of its constitution.

The first Annual General Meeting (AGM) of the Malaysian Radiological Society was held on 17 June 1978 at Lecture Hall 3, Faculty of Medicine, University of Malaya. The meeting was open to medical practitioners, final-year medical students, and radiographers.

On 9 September 1978, the society published its first newsletter. The publication was compiled by Dr Joginder Singh with administrative support from Ms Janet Low.

By 1980, Malaysia had approximately 37 practitioners in the fields of radiology, radiotherapy, oncology, and nuclear medicine, serving a population of about 12 million. The limited number of trained specialists contributed to the widespread use of X-ray services by general practitioners and untrained personnel, which became a subject of debate within the profession.

In response, the Malaysian Radiological Society Council, notably under the leadership of Dr Joginder Singh, took steps to uphold professional standards in imaging practice, including opposing efforts to establish a general practitioner-led X-ray society. These early efforts were regarded as foundational in maintaining quality and professional governance within the field of radiology in Malaysia.

== See also ==
- Biomedical Imaging and Intervention Journal
