= Frederic Gordon Smith =

British barrister and colonial judge (1886–1967)

Frederic Gordon Smith KC
- Smith in 1950

Chairman of the Public Service Commission
- In office 1 January 1951 – 11 May 1952
- Preceded by: Position established
- Succeeded by: Alfred William Frisby

Chief Justice of the Supreme Court of Palestine
- In office 1941–1943

Attorney General of Trinidad and Tobago
- In office 1932–1935

Attorney-General of Northern Rhodesia
- In office 1927–1932

Personal details
- Born: 23 April 1886
- Died: 14 Aug 1967 (aged 81)
- Occupation: Barrister, judge

Frederic Gordon Smith (23 April 1886 – 14 August 1967) was a British barrister and colonial judge.

== Early life and education ==
Smith was born on 23 April 1886, the son of Walter Leopold Smith, a solicitor of Dudley, Worcestershire and Mary Elizabeth Beach. He was educated at Bromsgrove School. In 1909, he qualified as a solicitor but removed his name from the roll in 1921, and enrolled as a student at Inner Temple and was called to the Bar.

== Career ==
Smith joined the legal department in Northern Rhodesia in 1913 and subsequently served as assistant legal adviser and public prosecutor in there from 1918 to 1924, and then from 1924 to 1926 as assistant attorney-general. During the First World War, he was on active service in East Africa with the Northern Rhodesia police. He then transferred to Kenya as solicitor-general, a post he held from 1926 to 1927, while also serving as a member of the Legislative Council of Kenya. In 1927, he returned to Northern Rhodesia where, until 1932, he was attorney general of the protectorate, acting judge in the High Court, and a member of the Executive and Legislative Councils.

In 1932, Smith was appointed KC and attorney general of Trinidad and Tobago and remained in the post until 1935. He then went to British Malaya where he served as a puisne judge of the Straits Settlements from 1935 to 1941, while also acting as judge of the Court of Appeal on occasion. The following year, he transferred to the Middle East where he served as Chief Justice of the Supreme Court of Palestine from 1941 to 1943.

After returning to the UK where for three years he was chairman of the Pensions Appeal Tribunal, he returned to Malaya where he served from 1945 to 1948 as a puisne judge (temporary) in Singapore, and in June 1948 was briefly acting Chief Justice of Singapore. On 1 January 1951, he was appointed chairman of the Public Services Commission, a post he held until his retirement in 1952.

== Personal life and death ==
Smith married Elsie Wood in 1912 and they had three sons.

Smith died on 14 Aug 1967, aged 81.
