= V. S. Rajan =

Singaporean dermatologist

Venkatesan Sundarajan Rajan (1934 – 15 July 1983) was a Singaporean dermatologist and the medical superintendent of the Middle Road Hospital. He was especially known for his teaching, research, and public health organizational work in venereal disease, especially gonorrhea, as well as dermatology.

== Early life and education ==
Rajan studied at the Faculty of Medicine, University of Malaya. He graduated from the university with a Bachelor of Medicine, Bachelor of Surgery.

== Career ==
From 1972 to 1983, Rajan served as the medical superintendent of the Middle Road Hospital. As the superintendent of the hospital, he was instrumental in the establishment of facilities and services for mycology, dermatopathology and immunodermatology, which advanced the field of dematology in Singapore. He was awarded the Pingat Pentadbiran Awam (Gold) in 1980. In 1982, he became an associate professor of dermatology and venereal diseases at the National University of Singapore. He also served as the chairman of the Dermatological Society of Singapore.

From 1970 to 1983, he served on the management committee of the Singapore Indian Fine Arts Society. He was also a member of the Hindu Advisory Board and the Tamil Language Cultural Society. He served as the vice-president of the Indian Education Trust.

== Personal life and death ==
Rajan was married and had a son. He died of a viral infection on 15 July 1983. He was 49.

Following his death, the Dr V. S. Rajan Memorial Scholarship Fund was established in his memory. On the first anniversary of his death, the Singapore Indian Fine Arts Society staged a musical recital in his memory. In 2023, the National Skin Centre named an auditorium after him.
