= Lam Sai Kit =

Malaysian scientist (born 1938)

Yang Berbahagia Emeritus Professor Dato' Dr. Lam Sai Kit DPMP
- Born: June 23, 1938 (age 88); Ipoh, Perak, Federated Malay States
- Education: Australian National University
- Occupation: Virologist
- Years active: 1966–present
- Known for: Discovery of the Nipah virus

Professor Dato' Lam Sai Kit (born: 23 June 1938) is a prominent Malaysian scientist who was central to the discovery of the Nipah virus that causes severe disease in both animals and humans. Prof Lam is currently an emeritus professor at the Faculty of Medicine, University of Malaya as well as a Research Consultant at University of Malaya.

He was awarded the Merdeka Award by the Government of Malaysia.

He is a member of the International Advisory Council in Universiti Tunku Abdul Rahman.

== Honors ==
- Perak
  - Knight Commander of the Order of the Perak State Crown (DPMP) – Dato' (2002)
