= Tan Chay Yan =

- 陳齊賢
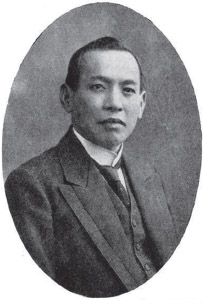
- Born: 1871; Malacca, Straits Settlements
- Died: March 6, 1916 (aged 45–46)
- Known for: Pioneering rubber plantation industry in Malacca
- Spouse: Chua Wan Neo
- Children: 7, including Robert Tan Hoon Siang
- Parent(s): Tan Teck Guan (father); Chua Siew Lim Neo (mother)

Tan Chay Yan (Chinese: 陳齊賢; Pe̍h-ōe-jī: Tân Chê-hiân; pinyin: Chén Qíxián; 1871 - 6 March 1916) was a rubber plantation merchant and philanthropist. A Peranakan, Tan is the grandson of philanthropist Tan Tock Seng by his father, Tan Teck Guan.

Tan was noted in Malayan history as the first man to plant rubber on a commercial basis, after he was introduced to rubber planting by Henry Nicholas Ridley. Subsequently, Tan started a 22-acre (89,000 m^{2}) rubber estate at Bukit Lintang. He then ventured his rubber plantation business into Sri Lanka. According to his family, Tan's rubber plantation still belonged to the family.

As a philanthropist, Tan also gave $15,000 towards the setting up of a medical college in Singapore. The donation went towards the construction of the Tan Teck Guan Building, which Tan named in memory of his late father. Tan was also appointed as a Justice of the Peace at age 24, and served on the Malacca Municipal Commission. He also served as a Trustee of the Cheng Hoon Teng Temple.

Tan died of malaria at the age of 46. A relative believed he could have caught it as he often spent the long hours spent at the rubber plantations. Tan left behind his wife, Chua Wan Neo, a tenth generation Nyonya and a descendant of Malaccan Kapitan Chua Su Cheong, six daughters and a son.

In view of his contributions, Tan has been memorialised via a variety of ways. The Papilionanda (originally Vanda) Tan Chay Yan, a hybrid bred by Tan's son Robert Tan Hoon Siang is named after him. A road in Melaka and Singapore was also named after him; in Singapore, Chay Yan Street can be found in Tiong Bahru.
