= Alfred William Frisby =

British colonial administrator (1897–1973)

Alfred William Frisby CBE ED
- Frisby in 1951

Chairman of the Public Service Commission
- In office 12 May 1952 – 8 July 1956
- Preceded by: Frederic Gordon Smith
- Succeeded by: Lim Han Hoe

Personal details
- Born: 20 December 1897
- Died: 9 February 1973 (aged 75) Devon, United Kingdom
- Education: University of Oxford (BA)

Military service
- Allegiance: United Kingdom
- Rank: Captain

Alfred William Frisby CBE ED (20 December 1897 – 9 February 1973) was a British colonial administrator and educator, who served as the director of education in British Malaya, and later the Colony of Singapore. He was the chairman of the Public Service Commission from 1952 to 1956, and the Civil Service Commission, Bahamas, from 1959 to 1962.

As director of education, he created the foundation of Singapore's education system, announcing plans for free primary education and multi-racial, regional English schools.

== Early life and education ==
Frisby was born on 20 December 1897. He attended Northampton School. During World War I, he served in the Bristol division of the Royal Naval Volunteer Reserve. In December 1916, Frisby was awarded an exhibition to attend the Oxford University Elementary Training College. Later, he attended Wadham College.

After the war, Frisby obtained a Bachelor of Arts from the University of Oxford, and a Diploma of Education.

== Career ==
In August 1922, Frisby was appointed as a European master in the education department of the Straits Settlements and Federated Malay States. In January 1923, he was commissioned as an honorary cadet second lieutenant in the Penang Free School Cadet Corps.

In August 1926, Frisby was commissioned as a second lieutenant in the Straits Settlements Volunteer Force. In September 1929, he became the headmaster of Victoria Institution. In December 1929, he was transferred to become the inspector of schools in Pahang.

On 25 April 1933, Frisby succeeded J. M. Meade as the inspector of schools in Malacca. In November 1934, he was transferred to Penang. In October 1935, he was appointed as assistant inspector of schools in Taiping, Perak.

In March 1936, Frisby was one of the two vice-presidents of the newly-established Rotary Club of Taiping. In July 1936, he was the acting inspector of schools in Perak. On 27 August 1936, he was transferred to Malacca. On 28 July 1939, Frisby was commissioned as a lieutenant in the Federated Malay States Volunteer Force. In May 1939, he was promoted to senior inspector of schools in Selangor.

During World War II, Frisby fought in the Malayan campaign as an adjutant of the 2nd Selangor Battalion. Two days before the surrender, he left Singapore for Batavia, before evacuating to Perth, Australia. In 1942, Frisby arrived in Northern Rhodesia to be its acting director of African education. In November 1945, Frisby returned to become director of education in British Malaya, and later in the Malayan Union. In 1947, he was the assistant director of Chinese schools in Kuala Lumpur.

In 1948, Frisby was transferred to the Colony of Singapore to be its director of education. On 15 February 1949, he was sworn in as a member of the Legislative Council of Singapore. In December 1949, Frisby announced plans to implement free primary education within five years, and converting racial and community schools to regional schools that educate children of all races. He elaborated that the intent was to have English-taught education, while teaching Malay, Mandarin, and Tamil languages as subsidiary subjects.

In February 1950, on the issue of pornographic magazines being sold in the Colony, Frisby said that it was "distinctly dangerous", especially to children, and sales should be banned. In April 1950, no action was taken by the Government, and sales of the magazines continued. In December 1951, Frisby proposed three-session schools to make education more accessible for several thousand children. Parents, principals, and teachers of English schools welcomed the idea. In January 1952, the plan was cancelled due to staffing and other issues.

In May 1952, Frisby retired as director of education. Chew Kia Song, president of the Singapore Teachers' Union, said that Frisby was "a magnificent builder" that "laid the foundation of the five-year education plan in the Colony". On 12 May 1952, he was appointed as the chairman of the Public Service Commission (PSC), succeeding Frederic Gordon Smith.

In 1955, Frisby wanted to retire, but he was requested to stay on for another year by Governor Robert Black. On 8 July 1956, Frisby stepped down as chairman of PSC, and returned to Surrey for his retirement. From 1959 to 1962, he was the chairman of the Civil Service Commission in the Bahamas.

== Personal life ==
Frisby was married. He played the piano and organ.

On 9 February 1973, Frisby died in Bideford Hospital, Devon, following a short illness. His funeral was held at North Devon Crematorium.

== Awards and decorations ==
- Commander of the Order of the British Empire, in 1952.
- British War Medal
- Victory Medal
- 1939–1945 Star
- Pacific Star
- Defence Medal
- War Medal 1939–1945
- King George VI Coronation Medal, in 1937.
- Queen Elizabeth II Coronation Medal, in 1953.
- Efficiency Decoration, in 1947.

In 1955, Frisby was awarded a Doctor of Laws by the University of Malaya in Singapore.

== Publications ==
- Frisby, Alfred William (1957). Teaching English: Notes and Comments on Teaching English Overseas. London: Longman.
