= Biomedical Imaging and Intervention Journal =

- Discipline: Radiology, Medical physics
- Language: English
- Edited by: Kwan-Hoong Ng, Norlisah Ramli

Publication details
- History: 2005–present
- Publisher: Department of Biomedical Imaging, University of Malaya (Malaysia)
- Frequency: Quarterly
- Open access: Yes
- License: Creative Commons Attribution License

Standard abbreviations
- ISO 4: Biomed. Imaging Interv. J.

Indexing
- ISSN: 1823-5530
- OCLC no.: 61659027

The Biomedical Imaging and Intervention Journal is a quarterly open access peer-reviewed medical journal established in July 2005. It is financed by donations from regional and international biomedical imaging industry and the University of Malaya Research Imaging Centre. The journal also receives support from many regional associations and societies and in turn has become the official publication of them. As of 2009, it is the official publication of the ASEAN Association of Radiologists, ASEAN Society of Interventional Radiology, Asia-Oceania Federation of Organizations for Medical Physics, Asian Oceania Society of Radiology, College of Radiology, Academy of Medicine Malaysia, Southeast Asian Federation of Organisations of Medical Physics, and the South East Asian Association of Academic Radiologists.

Shiao Eek Tee said "It is the first fully electronic imaging journal in the country"

== Abstracting and indexing ==
BIIJ is indexed by Scopus, EMBASE, Compendex, EBSCO, Chemical Abstracts, PubMed Central, and Inspec.

== Recorded presentations ==
The journal also publishes video recordings of presentations at selected meetings, conferences, and seminars, which may be used for educational purposes. Since November 2009, the videos are also made available on SciVee.
