= Academy of Medicine, Singapore =

- Formation: 1957
- Headquarters: Singapore
- President: Prof Lim Shih Hui
- Website: ams.edu.sg

The Academy of Medicine, Singapore (AMS), is a professional and educational organisation for doctors and dentists in Singapore.

== Background ==
The Academy of Medicine, Singapore, was founded in 1957 and served both Singapore and Malaysia until the union ended in 1965. The autonomous Academy of Medicine of Malaysia was founded in 1966 by Malaysian members of the AMS.

AMS founders included: Professor Gordon Arthur Ransome, the Academy's first Master; Dr Benjamin Henry Sheares, former President of Singapore; and Dr Yeoh Ghim Seng, former Speaker of Parliament.

== Fellowship ==
Fellowship of the Academy is denoted by the title FAMS (Fellow, Academy of Medicine, Singapore). It is a recognised postgraduate medical qualification in Singapore.

== Constituent colleges ==
- College of Anaesthesiologists
- College of Dental Surgeons
- College of Obstetricians and Gynaecologists
- College of Ophthalmologists
- College of Paediatrics and Child Health
- College of Physicians
- College of Public Health and Occupational Physicians
- College of Radiologists
- College of Surgeons
- College of Psychiatrists
- College of Emergency Physicians

== Constituent chapters ==
- Chapter of Clinician Educators
- Chapter of Clinician Scientists
- Chapter of Pathologists
- Chapter of Family Medicine
- Chapter of Intensivists

== See also ==
- Academy of Medicine of Malaysia
