= Chen Su Lan =

Singaporean doctor

Dr Chen Su Lan
- 陳樹南
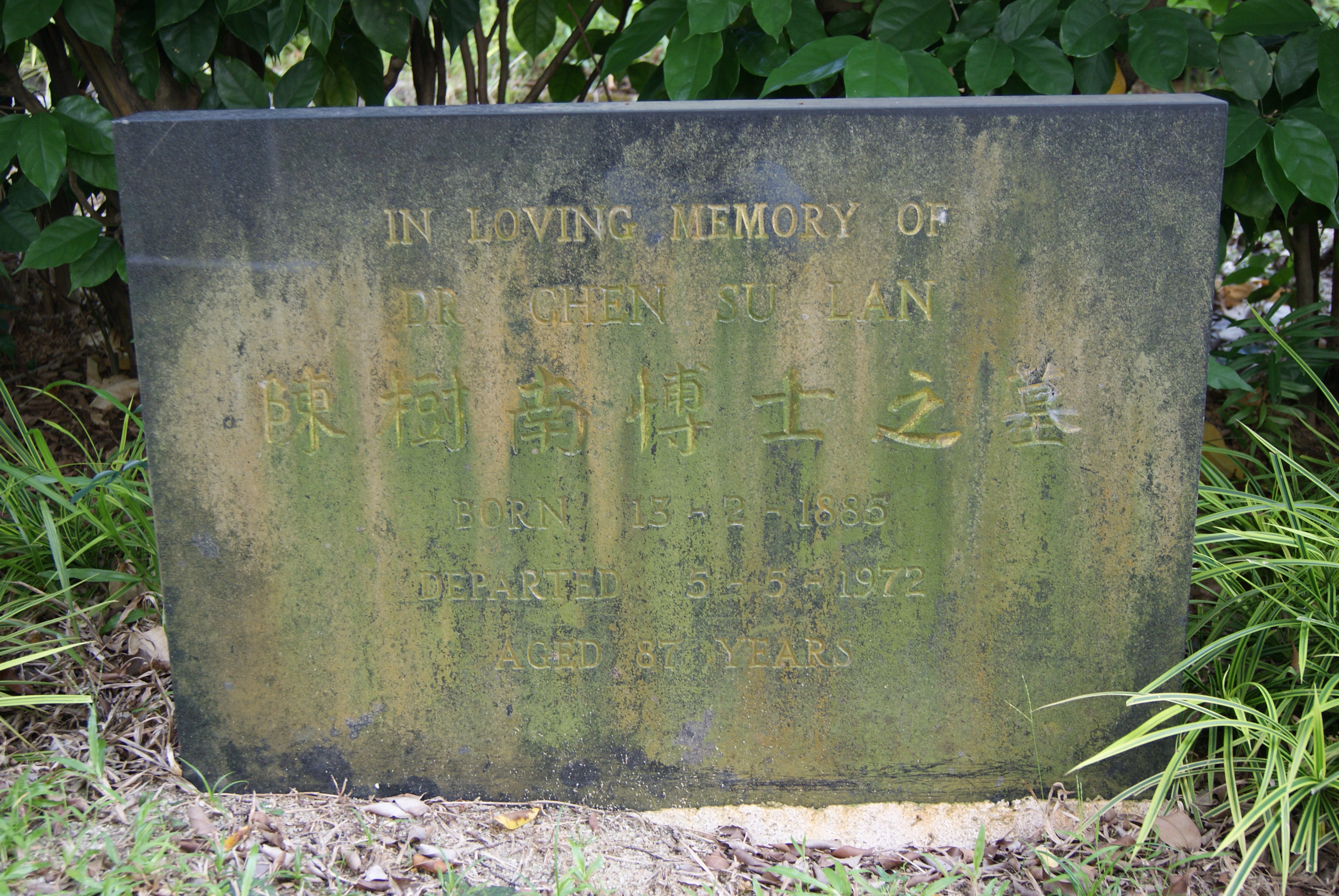
- Chen's gravestone in Bidadari Garden
- Born: 13 February 1885; Fuzhou, China
- Died: 2 May 1972 (aged 87); Singapore
- Occupation: Physician
- Known for: Philanthropy

Dr Chen Su Lan (Chinese: 陳樹南; pinyin: Chén Shùnán; 13 February 1885 – 5 May 1972) was a Singaporean doctor, and one of the first locals to graduate from medical school. He was also an anti-opium fighter, philanthropist and social reformer. He served in a number of important committees including the Tan Tock Seng Hospital Management Committee, the Central Midwives Board and the Council of King Edward VII College of Medicine. After the Japanese Occupation of Singapore, he joined the Advisory Council where he spoke out against social ills caused by the war. He founded the Chinese Young Men's Christian Association (YMCA) in 1945 and formed the Chen Su Lan Trust in 1947.

== Early life ==
Chen was born in Fuzhou, China as a third-generation Methodist. He enrolled at Anglo-Chinese College in Fuzhou when he was 15. At a revival meeting led by visiting Bishop Bradford, he pledged to become a preacher one day.

In 1905, he left for Singapore and enrolled to become one of the first students at the newly opened Straits Federated Malay States Government Medical School (now known as Yong Loo Lin School of Medicine). He obtained a Licentiate in Medicine at 1910, as part of the first batch of seven graduates. In addition, he also topped that class.

After graduation, he was not only busy with his own practice but he served on a number of important committees, including the Tan Tock Seng Hospital Management Committee, the Central Midwives Board and the Council of King Edward VII College of Medicine. He also founded the Alumni Association of the Medical College was elected president of the Malayan branch of the British Medical Association.

== Anti-opium fight ==
Chen was deeply concerned with the social and health conditions in Singapore. He recognised that opium addiction was a grim social problem, not helped by the fact that the colonial government monopolised the sale of the drug as means to regulate its use. At the risk of being labelled disloyal to the British, Chen mounted a campaign against opium addiction. He was the president of the Singapore Anti-Opium Society and the director of the Anti-Opium Clinic which he founded in 1933. However, in 1937, the outbreak of war in China caused donations to be diverted to the China Relief Fund and thus the clinic had to close down.

== Pacific War ==
When the Pacific War broke out in December 1941, the Japanese army made steady progress in its conquest of the Malayan peninsula. Chen, who felt that Singapore would fall, decided to flee from the island. On 13 February 1942, he boarded one of the last ships leaving Singapore but unfortunately, the ship was attacked, bombed and set on fire. The passengers abandoned ship and Chen found himself adrift in the cold sea, clinging on to a raft with a few other survivors. During those hours in the water, he re-evaluated his life and realised he had not kept to his childhood commitment to be a preacher.

Upon landing on shore at a mangrove forest, Chen returned home only to be detained by the Kempeitai (Japanese military police). An informer had told the Japanese that Chen and other leaders of the Methodist Church were conspiring against the Japanese government. Although his home was searched, no evidence was found which would incriminate him, and he was released.

== After Japanese occupation ==
After the war, the British Military Administration invited Chen to join the Advisory Council. Chen took the opportunity to speak out boldly against the numerous social problems that had arisen because of the war. To help solve these problems, in 1945, he founded the Chinese Young Men's Christian Association (now called the Metropolitan YMCA) to help provide demoralised youths with opportunities to rehabilitate themselves.

== Chen Su Lan Trust ==
Turning to his personal interest and commitment, he founded the Chen Su Lan Trust in 1947. The Trust disbursed funds and land to Christian organisations like Scripture Union, and for the founding in 1968 of the Methodist Children's Home which was named after him.

== Book ==
In 1969, Chen published a book entitled Pompong and Oxley Rise, which recounted his childhood days and his experiences during the Japanese Occupation. He had been planning to do this since the war as a way to express his gratitude to God. Though he had not fulfilled his commitment to be a preacher in the literal sense, his whole life had been dedicated to serve God through serving the needs of others.
