= Academy of Medicine of Malaysia =

- Formation: 1966
- Headquarters: Kuala Lumpur, Malaysia
- Master: Professor Dr Rosmawati Mohamed
- Website: www.acadmed.org.my

The Academy of Medicine of Malaysia is a professional and educational society for doctors in Malaysia. Founded in 1966, the academy is based in Kuala Lumpur and includes all medical specialities. The academy's motto is "terus maju" (English: progress ahead/continue to advance).

== Background ==
The Academy of Medicine, Singapore, was founded in 1957 and served both Singapore and Malaysia. The State of Singapore merged with the Federation of Malaya in 1963, but the union ended in 1965. Following the separation of the 2 countries, the independent Academy of Medicine of Malaysia was founded in 1966. The academy was officially established by the Societies Act (1966) on 22 December 1966. The academy's mandate includes all medical specialties.

== Membership ==
Membership is available to certified specialists who have obtained higher professional qualifications. Members and Fellows are entitled to use the letters AM and FAMM after their names.

Notable honorary members include:

- Mohamed Suffian Mohamed Hashim, former Chief Justice of Malaya and former Lord President of the Federal Court of Malaysia
- Raymond Hoffenberg, former President of the Royal College of Physicians
- Abdul Razak Hussein, former Prime Minister of Malaysia
- Mahathir Mohamad, former Prime Minister of Malaysia
- Ismail Abdul Rahman, former Deputy Prime Minister of Malaysia
- Tunku Abdul Rahman, first Prime Minister of Malaysia
- Michael Rosen, former President of the Royal College of Anaesthetists
- Tan Siew Sin, Malaysia's first Minister of Commerce and Industry and later Finance Minister
- Ian Todd, former President of the Royal College of Surgeons of England,

== Constituent colleges ==
- College of Anaesthesiologists
- College of Dental Specialists
- College of Emergency Physicians
- College of Obstetricians and Gynaecologists
- College of Paediatrics
- College of Pathologists
- College of Physicians
- College of Public Health Medicine
- College of Radiology
- College of Surgeons
- College of Ophthalmologist
