= SGH War Memorial =

Monument in Singapore's General Hospital

- Singapore
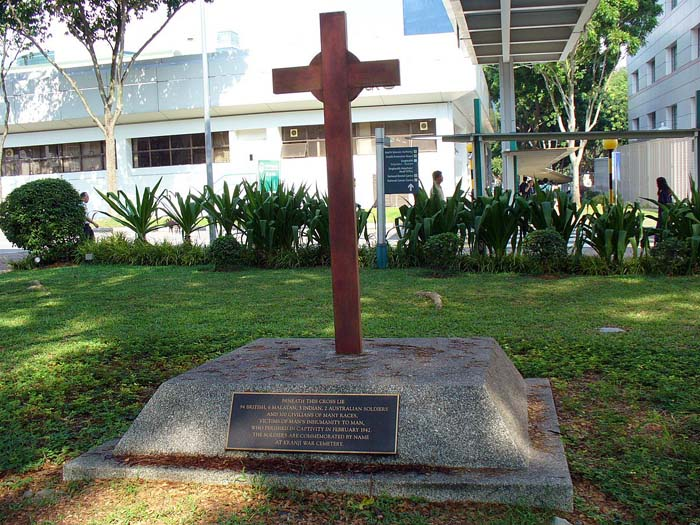
- The SGH War Memorial along College Road, Singapore
- For soldiers and civilian victims of the Japanese occupation of Singapore (February 1942)
- Location: 1°16′45.62″N 103°50′0.71″E; Singapore General Hospital near Outram, Singapore
- Total burials: 407
- Commemorated: 407

Burials by nation
- British: 94; Malayan: 6; Indian: 5; Australian: 2; Singaporean: 300

Burials by war
- Japanese Occupation of Singapore: 407
- Beneath this cross lie 94 British, 6 Malayan, 5 Indian, 2 Australian soldiers and 300 civilians of many races, victims of man's inhumanity to man, who perished in captivity in February 1942. The soldiers are commemorated by name at Kranji War Cemetery.

The SGH War Memorial is located within the grounds of the Singapore General Hospital (SGH) in Outram. This memorial marked the tragedy and the burial site of a group of medical students from the King Edward VII College of Medicine, who were killed during the Second World War in Singapore. In 2005, the memorial, along with eight other historic sites of SGH, was incorporated as part of the Outram Campus Heritage Trail that allow visitors to explore the important historical landmarks that are closely linked with the history of medical education in Singapore.

== History ==
=== Etymology ===
Built in 1882, the Singapore General Hospital used to occupy the site of a Sepoy Camp (Sepoy is from the Hindi सिपाही, sipāhī for "soldier") of the British East India Company. As a result, the hospital grounds is known to the Chinese to this day as sipai poh (si-pai-埔, POJ: si-pai-po͘), meaning "Sepoy plain" in the Hokkien language. Located nearby was the Outram Prison (now demolished), which was the site of the public executions of the 1915 Singapore Mutiny.

=== College of Medicine ===
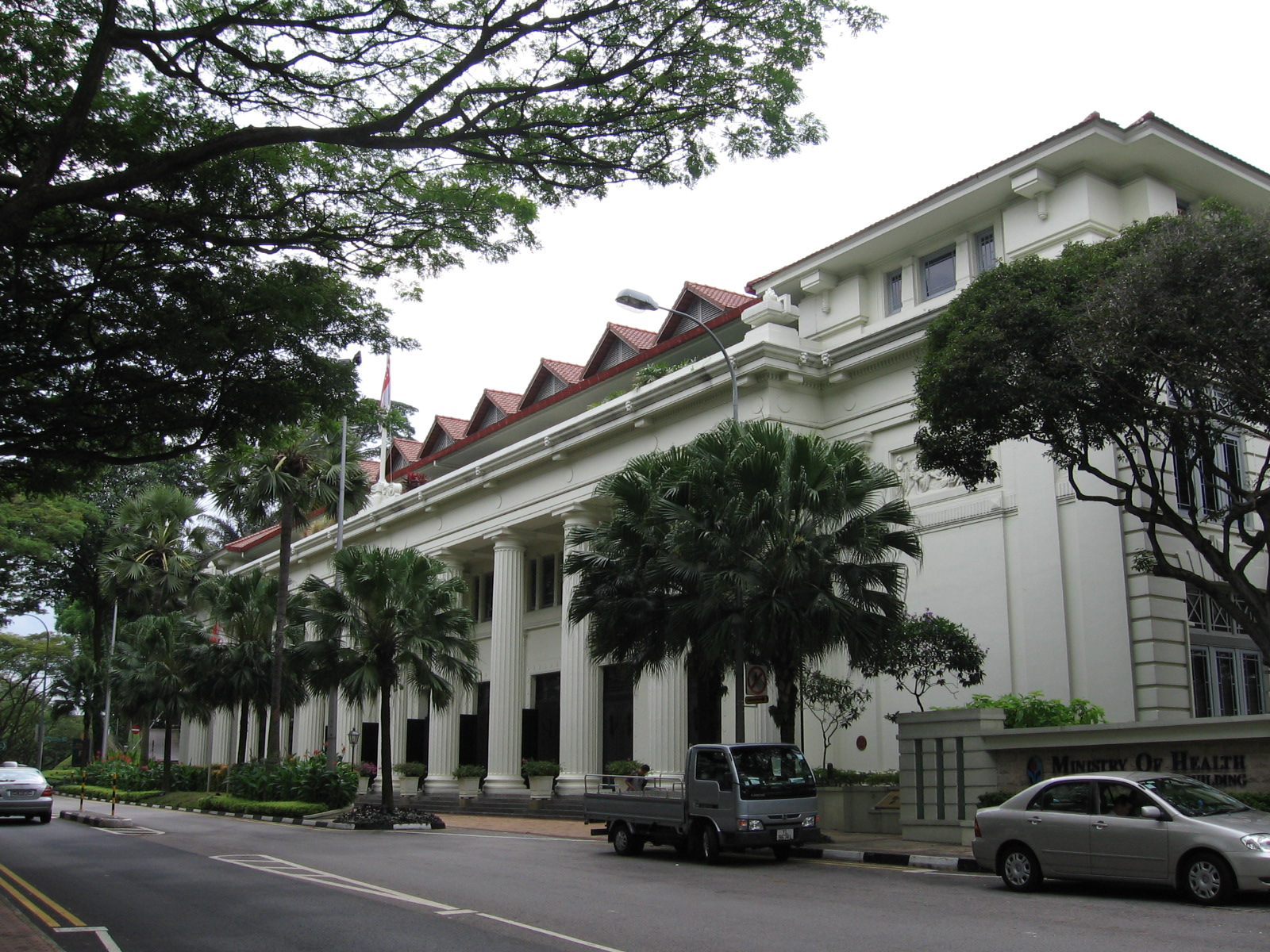
The College of Medicine Building along College Road in Outram

The College of Medicine Building, formerly known as King Edward VII College of Medicine, was opened on 15 February 1926 by Sir Laurence Nunns Guillemard, then Governor of the Straits Settlements and Patron of the College. The College had been the seat of medical education in Singapore.

The building was designed by Major P.H. Keys, who also designed the Fullerton Building in 1928. The architectural design of the building is reminiscent of classical Greek monuments such as the Acropolis in Athens. There are 12 columns of the Roman Doric order, bas relief of a Roman eagle and sculptures depicting the teaching and practice of medicine.

=== King Edward VII Hall ===
Built in 1957, King Edward Hall comprises a main block and two four-storey buildings serving as a hostel for medical students. Many leading doctors and dentists from Singapore and Malaysia such as Professor E. S. Monteiro, Benjamin Henry Sheares (2nd President of Singapore), and Mahathir Mohamad (4th Prime Minister of Malaysia) have passed through the hall and forged lifelong friendship during their stay here.

=== Double tragedy ===
On the morning of 14 February 1942, Yoong Tat Sin, a fourth-year medical student, was fatally injured by Japanese shelling while on duty at the Tan Tock Seng Hospital along Balestier Road. He was rushed to the Outram Road General Hospital for an emergency operation, but he died soon after.

That same evening, his fellow friends, about 25 students from the medical and dental faculties of the College of Medicine decided to give Yoong a proper burial within the grounds of the hospital. One of the five trenches dug out earlier for air raid purposes was converted into a grave for Yoong. As the grave was being prepared, they were spotted by Japanese gunners which began pouring a heavy barrage of shells at the defenceless students. Some quick-footed students managed to flee to safety towards the College building. However, those left behind only had time to leap into the trenches and Yoong's grave. As a result, 11 of the students were killed, three were wounded and only two managed to escape injury in the aftermath. Those who were killed instantaneously were given a burial on the morning of 16 February, a day after the surrender of Singapore to the Japanese, in the trenches where they fell.

=== In Memoriam ===
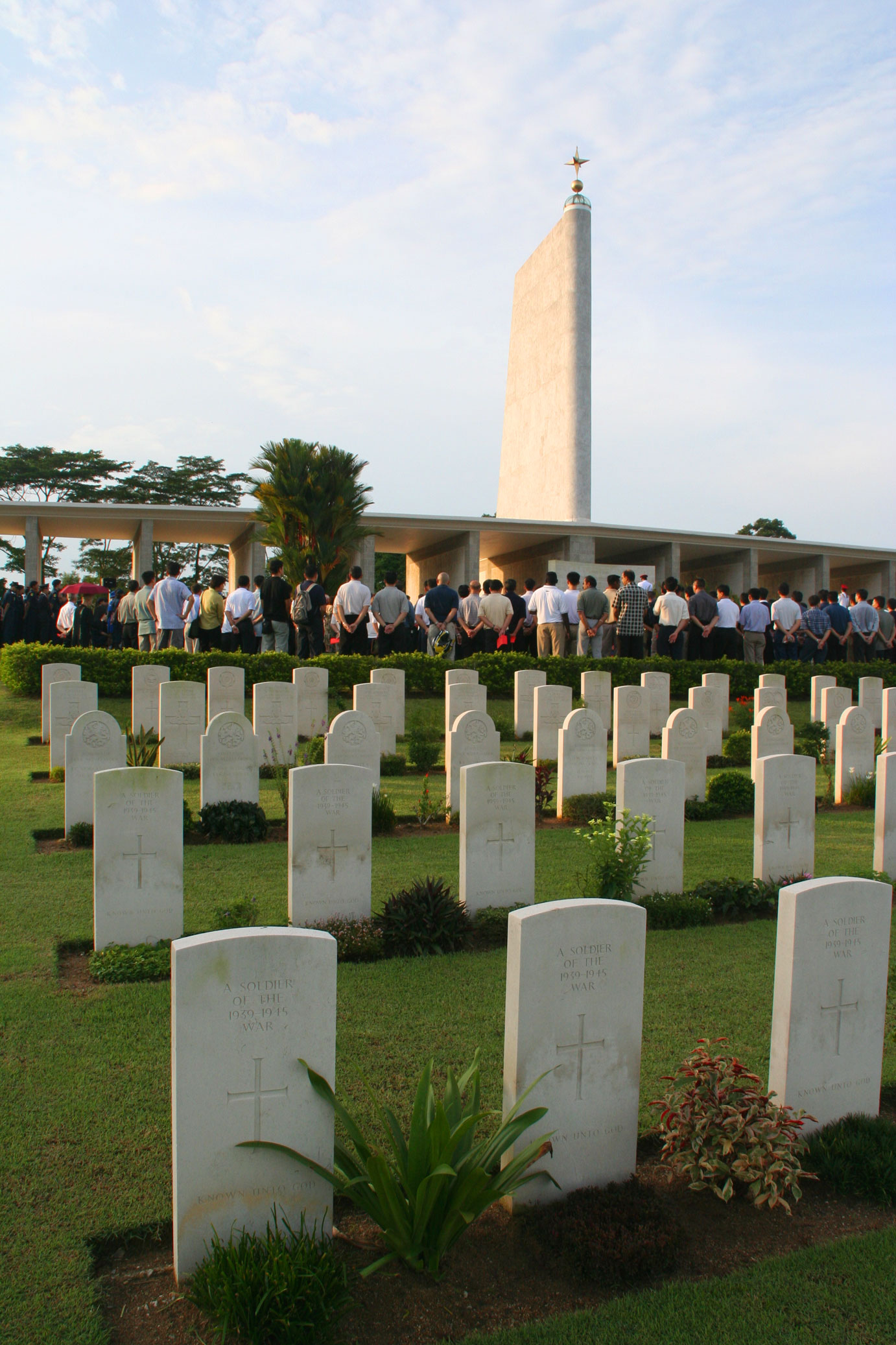
The military casualties at SGH were commemorated by name that was inscribed on the Singapore Civil Hospital Grave Memorial at the Kranji War Cemetery today

After the war, the British Colonial Government erected a memorial to commemorate the British soldiers and civilian war dead along College Road near the spot where the slain students were killed. The memorial consists of a painted wooden cross affixed to a pyramidal granite base. The words inscribed at the base of the cross reads:

Beneath this cross lie 94 British, 6 Malayan, 5 Indian, 2 Australian soldiers and 300 civilians of many races, victims of man's inhumanity to man, who perished in captivity in February 1942. The soldiers are commemorated by name at Kranji War Cemetery.

Together with the slain students, the Commonwealth military casualties were buried in a mass grave site on the hospital grounds (beneath the memorial) due to the intense shelling and lack of burial space in the last days before the fall of Singapore.

On 22 October 1948, Dr G. V. Allen, the principal of the Medical College then, unveiled a War Memorial Plaque, In Memoriam, in the presence of the governor of Singapore, Sir Franklin Gimson. The plaque, inscribed with the names of ten men and a woman, is dedicated to the eleven slain students and was hung in Harrower Hall. Built in 1931, Harrower Hall (now the Orthopaedic Surgery Department) was first home to the students' lounge of the Medical School. Over the years, the memorial plaque moved twice before finally resting in the foyer of the College of Medicine Building, close to the burial grounds of the slain students.

== See also ==
- Civilian War Memorial
- Bukit Batok memorials
- Other WWII Memorials in Singapore
