= Lim Han Hoe =

Singaporean physician and politician

Sir Lim Han Hoe CBE JP
- 林漢河
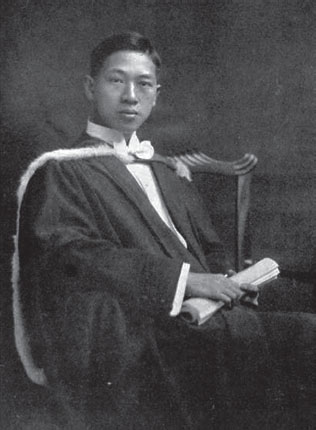
- Lim in One Hundred Years' History of the Chinese in Singapore (1923)
- Born: 27 April 1894; Singapore, Straits Settlements
- Died: 23 March 1983 (aged 88); Singapore
- Education: University of Edinburgh (MBChB); King Edward VII College of Medicine
- Occupations: Physician; politician
- Spouse: Chua Seng Neo
- Children: 4
- Parents: Lim Cheng Sah (father); Chew Eu Neo (mother)

Lim Han Hoe
- Traditional Chinese: 林漢河
- Simplified Chinese: 林汉河
Transcriptions
Standard Mandarin
- Hanyu Pinyin: Lín Hànhé
- Bopomofo: ㄌㄧㄣˊ ㄏㄢˋ ㄏㄜˊ

Lim Han Hoe (Note: simplified Chinese: 林汉河; traditional Chinese: 林漢河; pinyin: Lín Hànhé) CBE JP (27 April 1894 – 23 March 1983) was a Singaporean physician and politician.

== Early life and education ==
Lim was born on 27 April 1894 to his father Lim Cheng Sah and his mother Chew Eu Neo.

Lim was educated at Chung Cheng High School, St Andrew's School, and Raffles Institution.

Later, he was before enrolled at the Straits Medical School (later renamed to King Edward VII College of Medicine). In May 1912, he passed the first year subject in osteology. In June 1912, Lim left Singapore for London on the Iyo Maru, to study further in medicine.

In 1918, Lim graduated from the University of Edinburgh, with a Bachelor of Medicine, Bachelor of Surgery. Lim also joined the Royal College of Surgeons of Edinburgh and the Royal College of Physicians of Edinburgh.

== Career ==
After graduation, Lim worked at St Andrew's Hospital in Scotland for a year. In February 1919, he was appointed as house surgeon to the North Devon Infirmary, in Barnstaple, England. He was subsequently appointed as ship's surgeon by the China Mutual Steamship Company before returning to Singapore, to start his general practice.

In November 1924, Lim was elected as a director of the Singapore Chinese Girls' School. In 1925, he was elected as vice president of the Singapore Football Association in February, and the Straits Chinese British Association (SBCA) in November.

In February 1926, Lim was appointed as a municipal commissioner of the Municipal Commission. In February 1928, Lim criticised the milk inspection system, after 70% of milk samples had bacteria, which meant that fresh milk of poor quality was being sold in Singapore. Lim suggested adding certificates to clean dairies, so that it could be showed "that the milk was of a certain standard".

In November 1930, Lim was appointed as a council member of the King Edward VII College of Medicine. In December 1930, he was elected as chairman of SBCA.

In April 1931, Lim was elected as vice president of the Rotary Club of Singapore. In June 1933, he resigned from the club, due to an "inability to attend meetings".

Lim was a Justice of the Peace, as well as a member of numeral public bodies like the Chinese Advisory Board and the Education Committee.

In November 1933, Lim was appointed as an unofficial member of the Legislative Council of the Straits Settlements, becoming the council's senior Chinese unofficial member the next year, and was appointed as an unofficial member of the Executive Council of the Straits Settlements in 1940.

Lim was arrested after the fall of Singapore to the Empire of Japan in 1942. During the Japanese occupation, he was imprisoned for being accused of secretly listening to the broadcasting of the Allied nations. He was not released until the end of the Second World War in 1945.

After the war, he was appointed to the Singapore Advisory Council in June 1946 after the resignation of Wee Swee Teow, where served as an unofficial member from 1946 to 1948 and a senior unofficial member of the Executive Council of Singapore from 1948 to 1951.

In December 1947, the governor of Singapore decided to introduce income tax in Singapore, against the advice of the Singapore Advisory Council. The unofficial members of the council, including Lim, decided to resign in protest of the decision. Lim later decided not to resign and also proposed to ask the two resigned members to withdraw their resignations.

In December 1951, Lim resigned from the Executive Council of Singapore due to his deteriorating health and was replaced by Rajabali Jumabhoy.

After the war, he helped found the University of Malaya and was appointed a member of the Public Service Commission (PSC) from 1952 to 1956, serving as its chairman for less than a year in 1956.

Later in his life, he withdrew from politics as Singapore gradually gained self-governance and subsequently independence.

== Honours ==
On 12 June 1941, Lim was made a Commander of the Order of the British Empire for public services in the Straits Settlements.

In 1946, Lim became the second Malayan Chinese to receive the honour of knighthood for public services in the Straits Settlements.

In 1951, Lim was conferred an honorary Doctor of Laws degree by the University of Malaya.

== Personal life ==
Lim was a member of the Straits Chinese Literary Association. He was also president of the St Andrew's Old Boys' Association, and the Straits Chinese Football Association.

== Notes ==
Political offices
Preceded by Tan Cheng Lock	Senior Chinese unofficial member of the Legislative Council of the Straits Settlements; 1934–1942	Succeeded by Japanese occupation
Preceded by New creation	Senior unofficial member of the Executive Council of Singapore; 1948–1951	Succeeded by E. M. F. Fergusson
Preceded by Alfred William Frisby	Chairman of the Public Service Commission; 1956	Succeeded by W. L. Blythe
Party political offices
Preceded by Wee Swee Teow	Chairman of the Straits Chinese British Association; 1930–1932	Succeeded by Sir Ong Siang Song
