= College of Medicine Building =

Historic building in Singapore

- Bangunan Maktab Perubatan 医药学院大厦
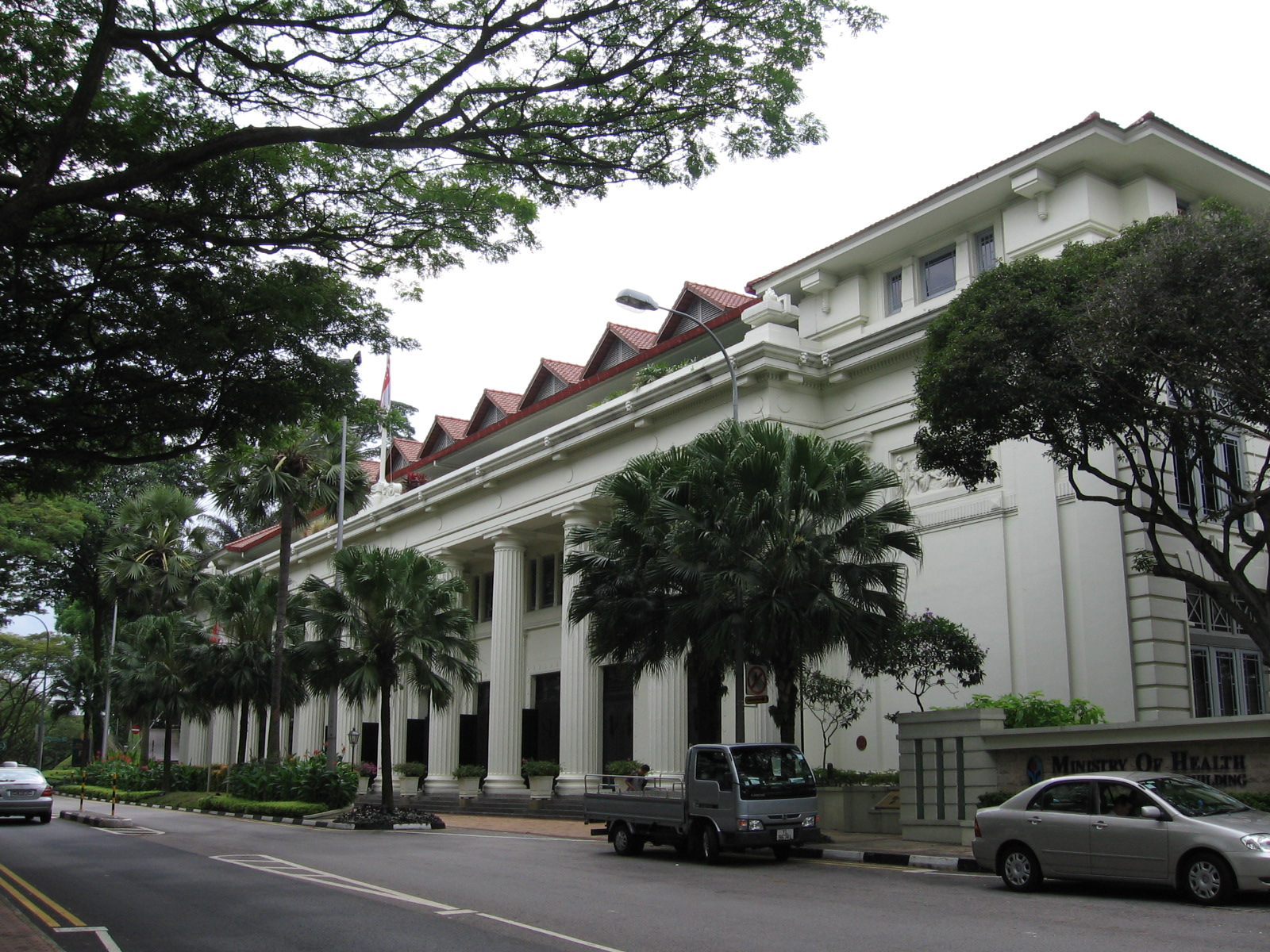
- College of Medicine Building in 2005
- Interactive map of the College of Medicine Building area

General information
- Type: Government offices
- Architectural style: Low-rise
- Location: 16 College Road, Singapore 169854
- Coordinates: 1°16′49″N 103°50′01″E
- Owner: Ministry of Health
- Management: Ministry of Health

Technical details
- Floor count: 3

National monument of Singapore
- Designated: 2 December 2002; 23 years ago
- Reference no.: 47

The College of Medicine Building (Malay: Bangunan Maktab Perubatan; Chinese: 医药学院大厦) is a historic building in Singapore, located within the grounds of the Singapore General Hospital at Outram Park, within the Bukit Merah Planning Area near Singapore's central business district. Its name comes from its former function as the location for the King Edward VII College of Medicine, the first school of medicine in British Malaya (Present day: Malaysia and Singapore).
